= Funnelbeaker culture =

North-central European culture around 4300–2800 BCE

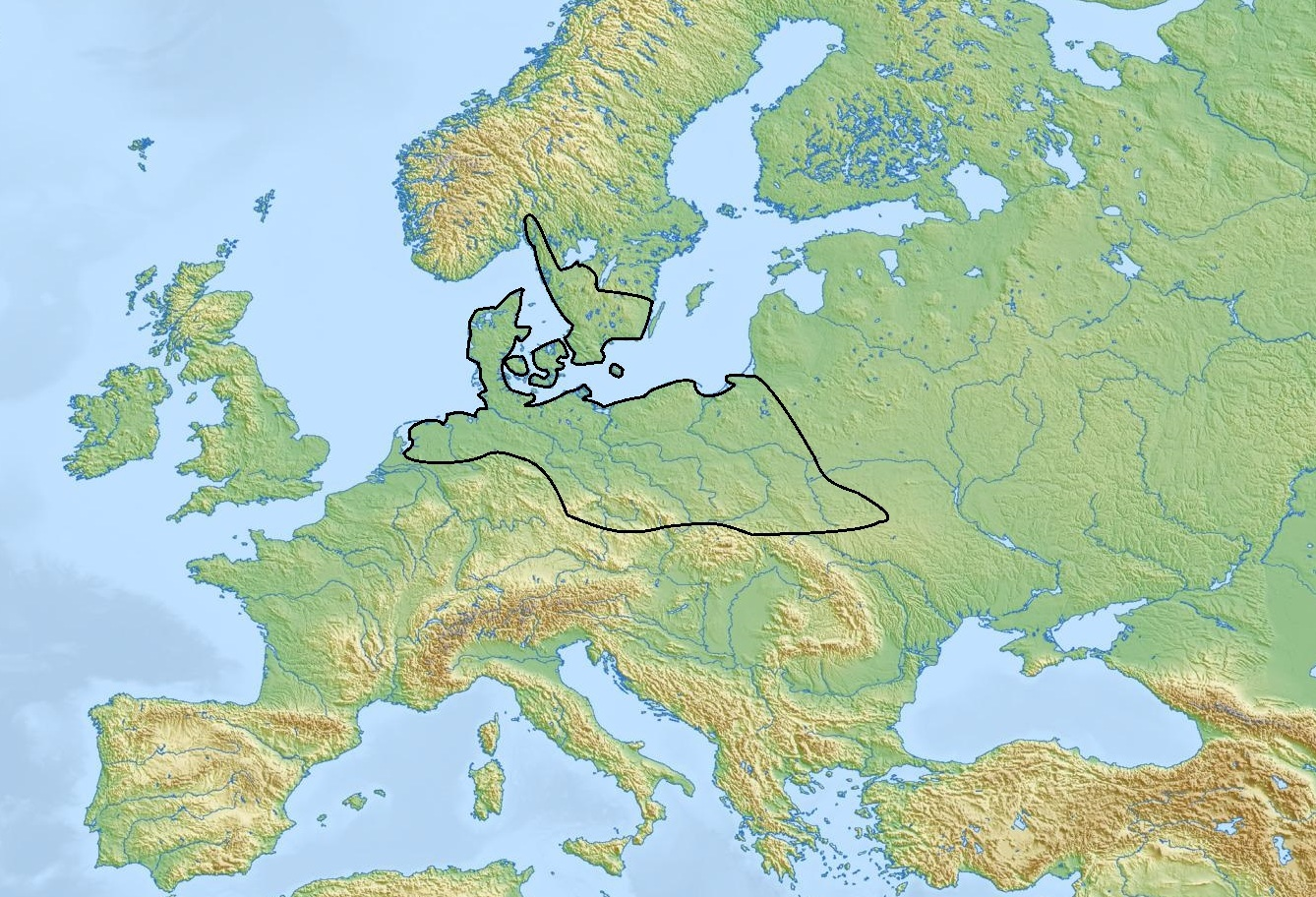
- Geographical range: Europe
- Period: Neolithic, Chalcolithic
- Dates: c. 4100 BCE – 2800 BCE
- Preceded by: Linear Pottery culture; Rössen culture; Michelsberg culture; Lengyel culture; Ertebølle culture; Dnieper-Donets culture
- Followed by: Globular Amphora culture; Schönfeld culture; Corded Ware culture; Bell Beaker culture; Baden culture; Pitted Ware culture; Single Grave culture

The Funnel(-neck-)beaker culture, in short FBC, TRB or TBK (German: Trichter(-rand-)becherkultur, Dutch: Trechterbekercultuur; Danish: Tragtbægerkultur; c. 4100–2800 BCE), was an archaeological culture in north-central Europe. It developed as a technological merger of local neolithic and mesolithic techno-complexes between the lower Elbe and middle Vistula rivers. These predecessors were the (Danubian) Lengyel-influenced Stroke-ornamented ware culture (STK) groups/Late Lengyel and Baden-Boleráz in the southeast, Rössen groups in the southwest and the Ertebølle-Ellerbek groups in the north. The TRB introduced farming and husbandry as major food sources to the pottery-using hunter-gatherers north of this line.

The TRB techno-complex is divided into a northern group including Northern Germany and southern Scandinavia (TRB-N, roughly the area that previously belonged to the Ertebølle-Ellerbek complex), a western group in the Netherlands between the Zuiderzee and lower Elbe that originated in the Swifterbant culture, an eastern group centered on the Vistula catchment, roughly ranging from Oder to Bug, and south-central groups (TRB-MES, Altmark) around the middle and upper Elbe and Saale. Especially in the southern and eastern groups, local sequences of variants emerged. In the late 4th millennium BCE, the Globular Amphora culture (GAC) replaced most of the eastern and subsequently also the southern TRB groups, reducing the TRB area to modern northern Germany and southern Scandinavia.

The younger TRB in these areas was superseded by the Single Grave culture (EGK) at about 2800 BCE. The north-central European megaliths were built primarily during the TRB era.

== Nomenclature ==
The Funnelbeaker culture is named for its characteristic ceramics, beakers and amphorae with funnel-shaped tops, which were found in dolmen burials.

== History ==
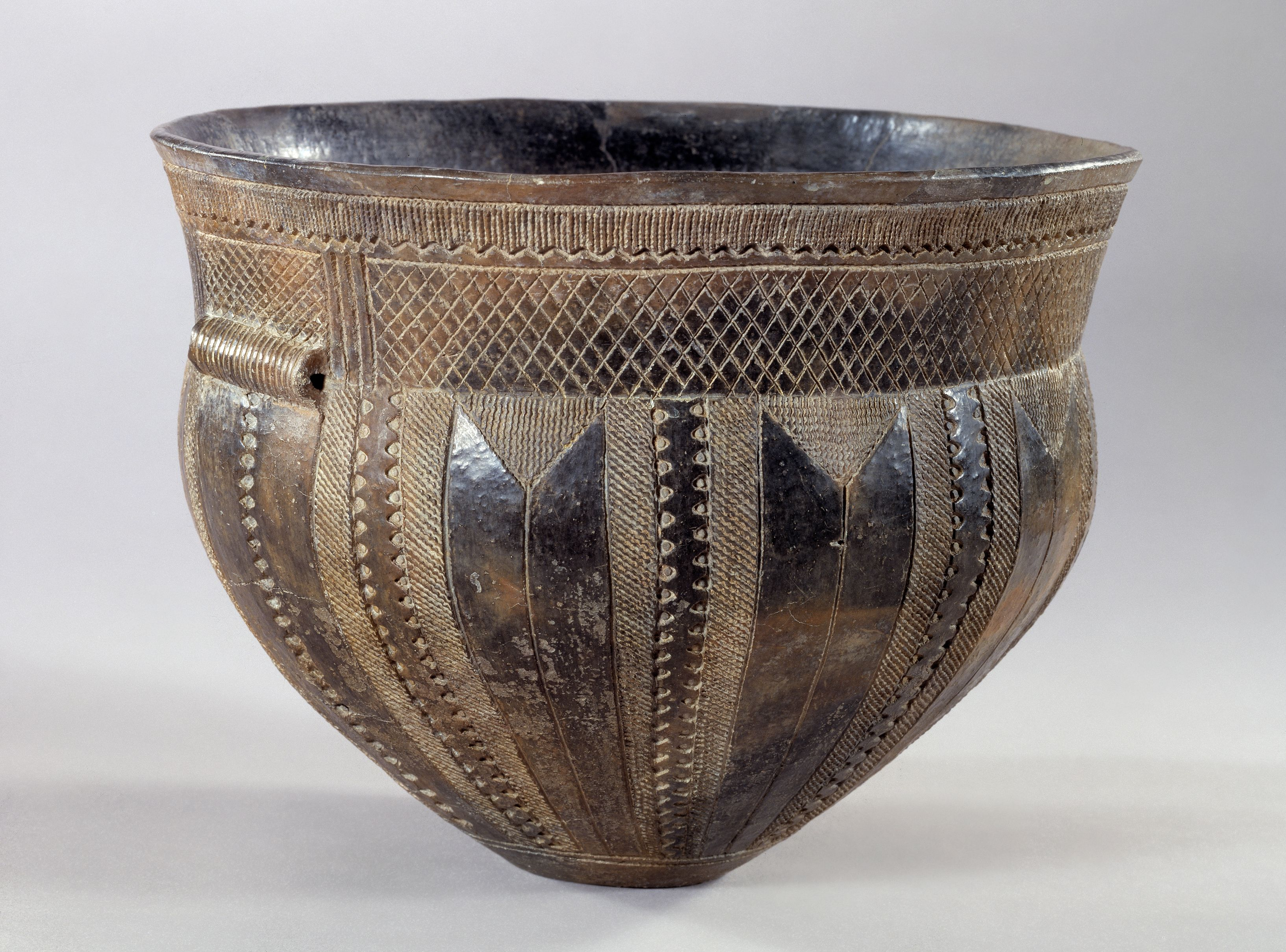
Skarpsalling vessel, Denmark, 3200 BCE

The Funnelbeaker culture emerged in northern modern-day Germany c. 4100 BCE. Archaeological evidence strongly suggests that it originated through a migration of colonists from the Michelsberg culture of Central Europe. The Michelsberg culture is archaeologically and genetically strongly differentiated from the preceding post-Linear Pottery cultures of Central Europe, being distinguished by increased levels of hunter-gatherer ancestry. Its people were probably descended from farmers migrating into Central Europe out of Iberia and modern-day France, who in turn were descended from farmers of the Cardial Ware cultures who had migrated westwards from the Balkans along the Mediterranean coast. Connections between the Funnelbeakers and these farmers of the Atlantic coast is supported by genetic evidence.

After its establishment, the Funnelbeaker culture rapidly spread into southern Scandinavia and Poland, in what appears to have been a well-organized colonizing venture. In southern Scandinavia it replaced the Ertebølle culture, which had maintained a Mesolithic lifestyle for about 1500 years after farming arrived in Central Europe. The emergence of the Neolithic British Isles through maritime colonization by Michelsberg-related groups occurred almost at the same time as the expansion of the Funnelbeaker culture into Scandinavia, suggesting that these events may be connected. Although they were largely of Early European Farmer (EEF) descent, people of the Funnelbeaker culture had a relatively high amount of hunter-gatherer admixture, particularly in Scandinavia, suggesting that hunter-gatherer populations were partially incorporated into it during its expansion into this region. People of the Funnelbeaker culture often had between 30% and 50% hunter-gatherer ancestry depending on the region.

During later phases of the Neolithic, the Funnelbeaker culture re-expanded out of Scandinavia southwards into Central Europe, establishing several regional varieties. This expansion appears to have been accompanied by significant human migration. The southward expansion of the Funnelbeaker culture was accompanied by a substantial increase in hunter-gatherer lineages in Central Europe. The Funnelbeaker communities in Central Europe which emerged were probably quite genetically and ethnically mixed, and archaeological evidence suggests that they were relatively violent.

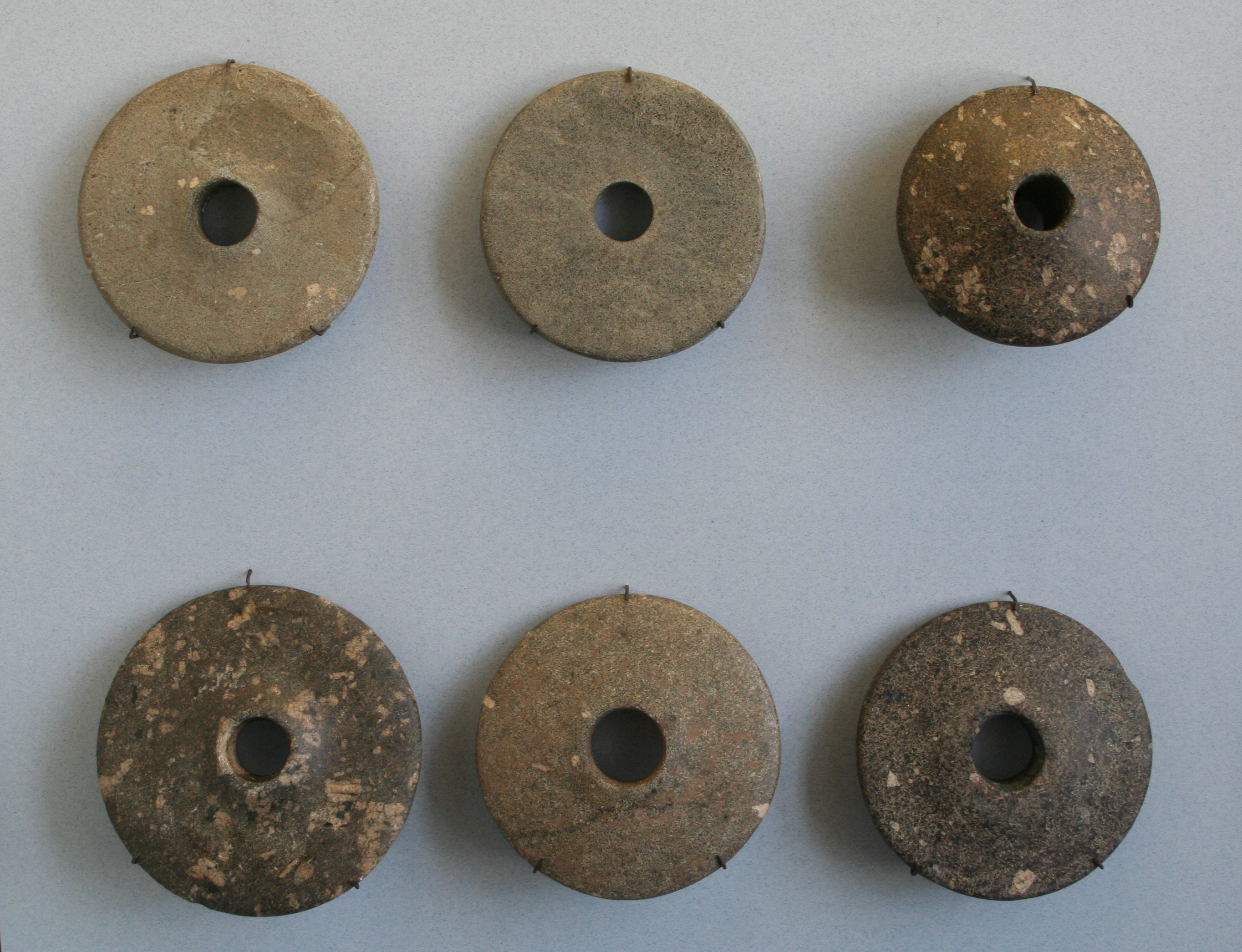
Disc-shaped stone maceheads.

From the middle of the 4th millennium BCE, the Funnelbeaker culture was gradually replaced by the Globular Amphora culture on its southeastern fringes, and began to decline in Scandinavia.

In the early 3rd millennium BCE, the Corded Ware culture appeared in Northern Europe. Its peoples were of marked steppe-related ancestry and traced their origins in cultures further east. This period is distinguished by the construction of numerous defensive palisades in Funnelbeaker territory, which may be a sign of violent conflict between the Funnelbeakers, Corded Ware, and Pitted Ware. By 2650 BCE, the Funnelbeaker culture had been replaced by the Corded Ware culture. Genetic studies suggest that Funnelbeaker women were incorporated into the Corded Ware culture through intermixing with incoming Corded Ware males, and that people of the Corded Ware culture continued to use Funnelbeaker megaliths as burial grounds. Subsequent cultures of Late Neolithic, Bronze Age, and Iron Age Central Europe display strong maternal genetic affinity with the Funnelbeaker culture.

== Distribution ==
The TRB ranges from the Elbe catchment in Germany and Bohemia with a western extension into the Netherlands, to southern Scandinavia (Denmark up to Uppland in Sweden and the Oslofjord in Norway) in the north, and to the Vistula catchment in Poland and the area between Dnister and Western Bug headwaters in Ukraine in the east.

Variants of the Funnelbeaker culture in or near the Elbe catchment area include the Tiefstich pottery group in northern Germany as well as the cultures of the Baalberge group (TRB-MES II and III; MES = Mittelelbe-Saale), the Salzmünde and Walternienburg and Bernburg (all TRB-MES IV) whose centres were in Saxony-Anhalt.

== Characteristics ==
=== Settlements ===
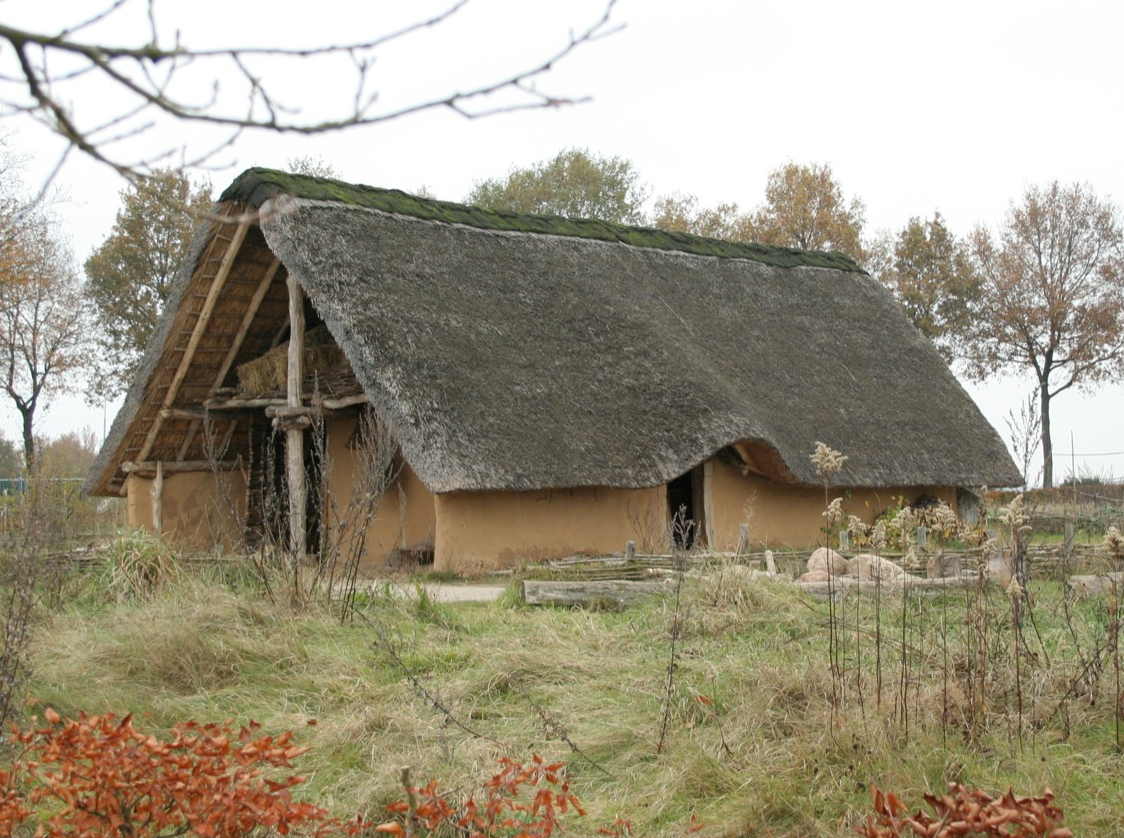
Reconstruction of a Funnelbeaker culture house

With the exception of some inland settlements such as the Alvastra pile-dwelling, the settlements are located near those of the previous Ertebølle culture on the coast. It was characterized by single-family daubed houses c. 12 m x 6 m.

=== Economy ===
Studies on plant use at Funnel Beaker sites are biased by the scarcity of sites with waterlogged preservation. Based on analysis from northern Germany, Denmark, Sweden and the Netherlands, the state of the art is that the crop analyses show assemblages that are dominated by Hordeum vulgare var. nudum (naked barley) and Triticum turgidum ssp. dicoccum (Triticum dicoccum, emmer). Moreover, Triticum monococcum ssp. monococcum (Triticum monococcum, einkorn) and Triticum aestivum ssp. aestivum and/or Triticum turgidum ssp. durum/turgidum (Triticum aestivum/Triticum turgidum, free-threshing wheat) frequently occur in small quantities. Triticum durum/turgidum (hard/rivet wheat) has been demonstrated at Frydenlund and in Albersdorf.

Oil plants Linum usitatissimum (linseed) and Papaver somniferum ssp. setigerum (opium poppy) occur very scarcely, and mostly from the Middle Neolithic (c. 3300 BCE) onwards. However, Linum and Papaver are probably underrepresented at Funnel Beaker sites. In contrast to starch-rich seeds/fruits, these oil-rich remains easily burn away when in contact with fire.

Wild fruit remains preserved as carbonised remains include e.g. Corylus avellana (hazelnut), Malus sylvestris (crab apple), Crataegus monogyna (common hawthorn) (also found in Wangels), Rubus fruticosus (blackberry), Rubus idaeus (raspberry), and Viscum album (mistletoe), while use of Prunus spinosa (sloe) is suggested by a single imprint.

In a recent paper, scientists from Kiel University (Collaborative Research Centre 1266) have found that although there are general similarities in used plants, differences in the production are evident. This is shown by two recently investigated sites. In Frydenlund, Funen, Denmark, the grinding stones were used to grind wild plants only. In Oldenburg, Germany, grain was processed. In Frydenlund, the absence of cereal grinding combined and an abundance of carbonised cereals from soil samples indicates that probably grain was processed to a porridge-like meal. In Oldenburg, in contrast, bread (possible flat bread) was produced in addition to porridge.

The Funnelbeaker culture was dominated by animal husbandry of sheep, cattle, pigs and goats, but there was also hunting and fishing.

There was also flint mining (in the Malmö region) and collection of flintstone (Świętokrzyskie Mountains), which was traded into regions lacking the stone, such as the Scandinavian hinterland. Huge flint axes from Denmark or northern Germany were distributed to Dutch groups.

=== Technology ===
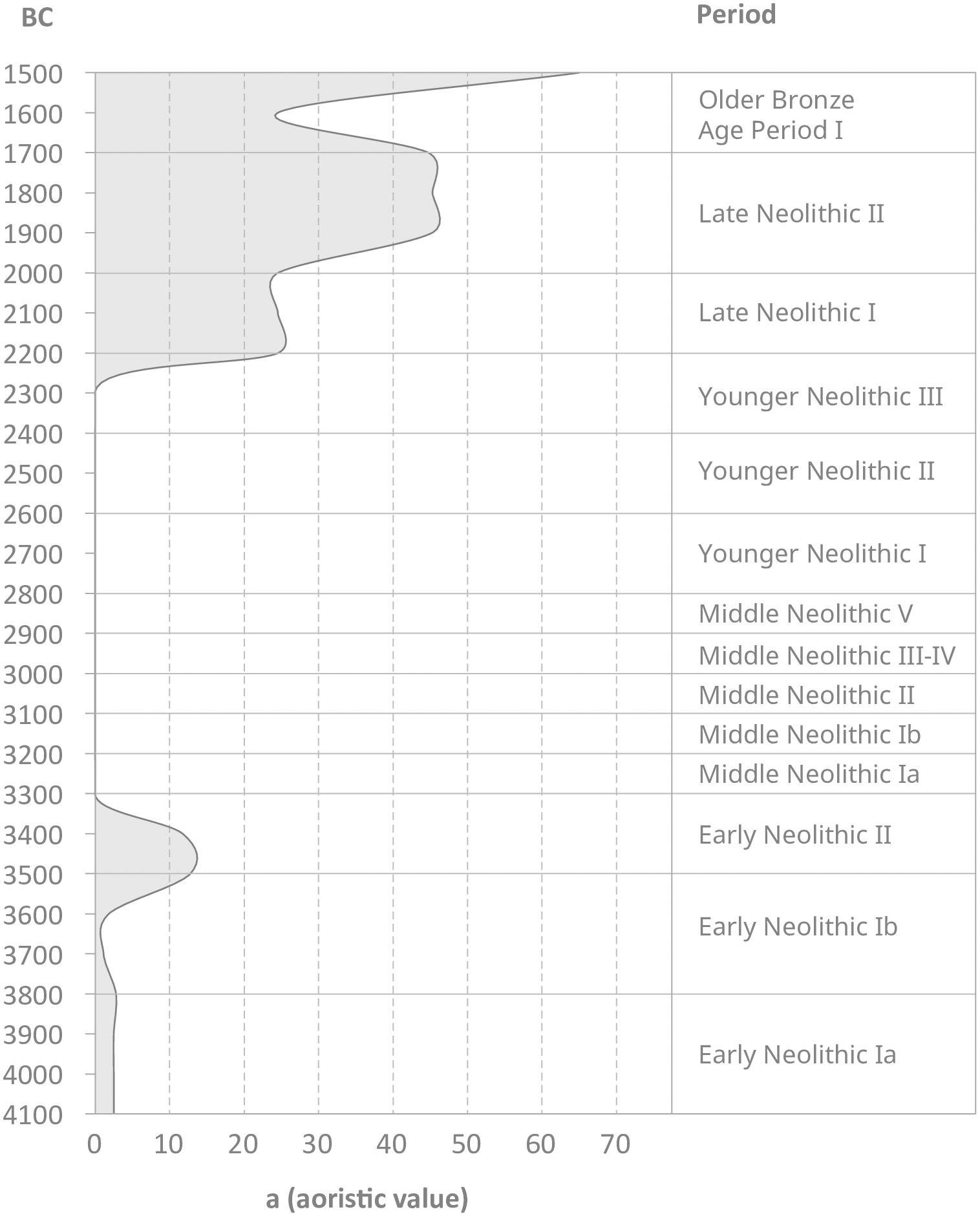
The frequency of metal in northern Germany during the Neolithic and early Bronze Age

The culture used copper, especially daggers and axes. In contrast to earlier beliefs that the copper originated in the Austrian Alps, recent studies established that the early copper (4100-3000 BCE) was mined in Serbian and Bulgarian mines. Evidence for copper smelting in Scandinavia dates from c. 3500 BC. Artefacts made from arsenical bronze are also known from Funnelbeaker sites in the 4th millennium BC, made using the lost-wax casting method. The number of copper artefacts decreases significantly between 3300 and 2800 BCE and they are almost absent between 2800 and 2300 BCE.

The Funnelbeaker Culture preserves the oldest dated evidence of wheeled vehicles in middle and northern Europe. One example is the engraving on a ceramic tureen from Bronocice in Poland on the northern edge of the Beskidy Mountains (northern Carpathian ring), which is indirectly dated to the time span from 3636 to 3373 BCE and is the oldest evidence for covered carriages in Central Europe. They were drawn by cattle, presumably oxen whose remains were found with the pot. Today it is housed in the Archaeological Museum of Cracow (Muzeum Archeologiczne w Krakowie), Poland. At Flintbek in northern Germany cart tracks dating from c. 3400 BCE were discovered underneath a megalithic long barrow. This is the earliest known direct evidence for wheeled vehicles in the world (i.e. not models or images).

The Funnel Beaker Culture is associated with skilfully crafted objects such as flint axes or battle axes.

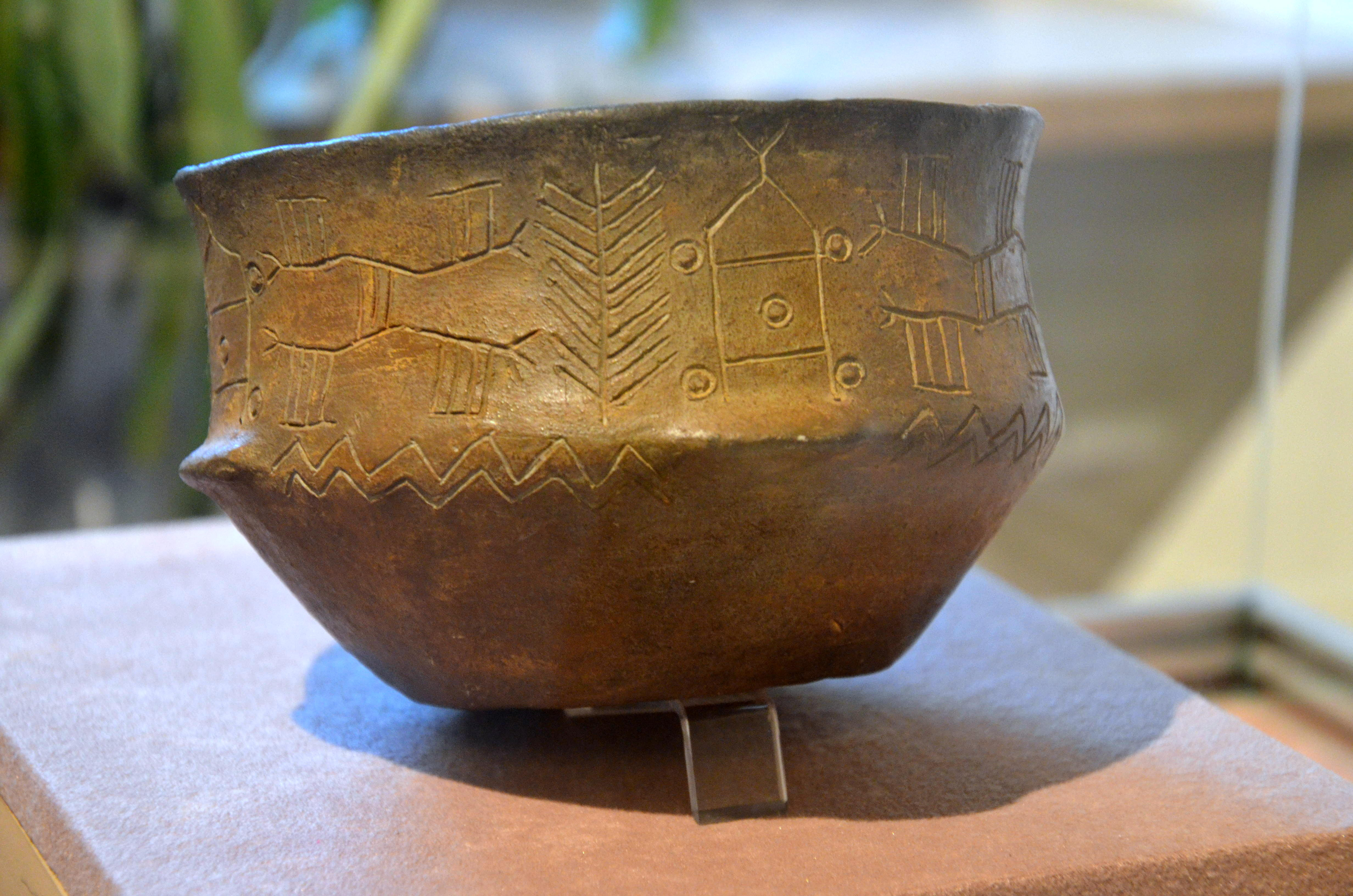
The Bronocice Pot, Poland, c. 3500-3350 BCE.

Wheeled vehicle representation on the Bronocice pot

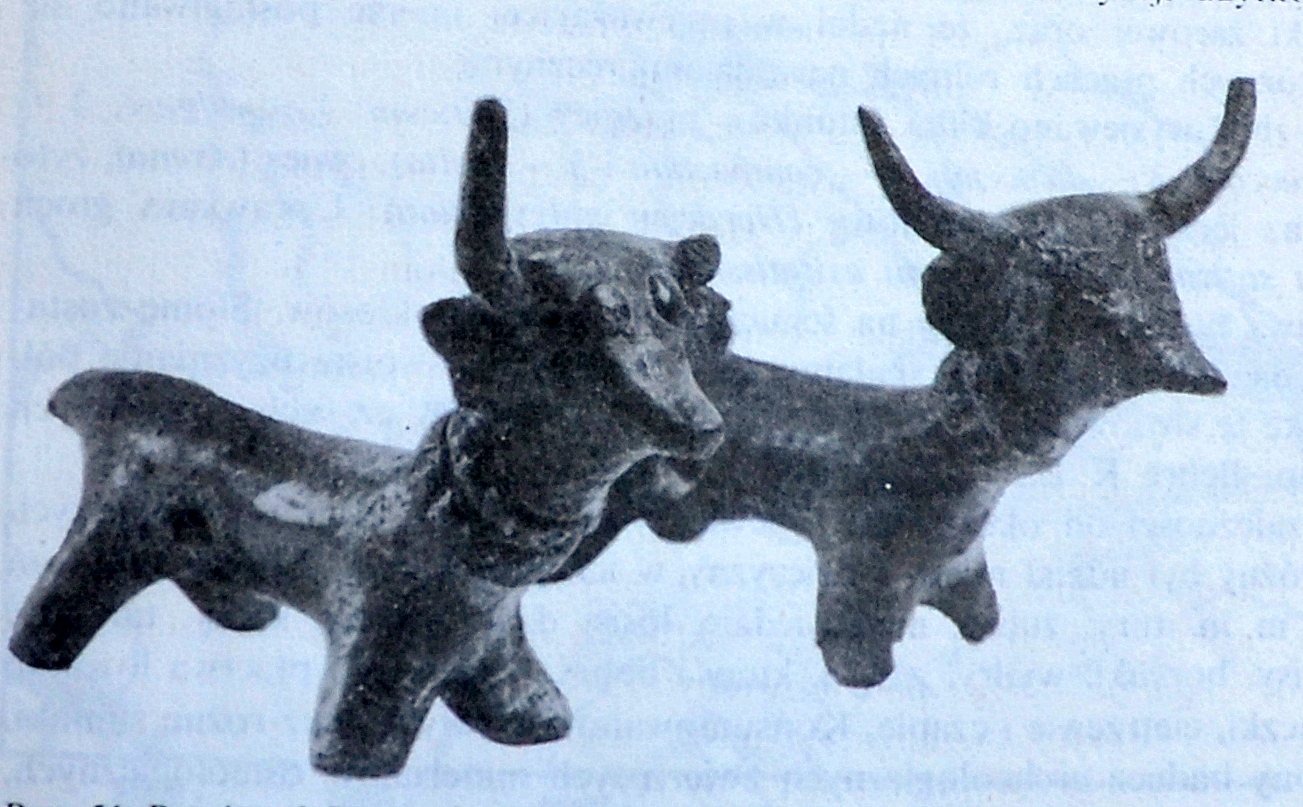
Arsenical bronze ox figurines from Bytyń, Poland, 4th mill. BCE.

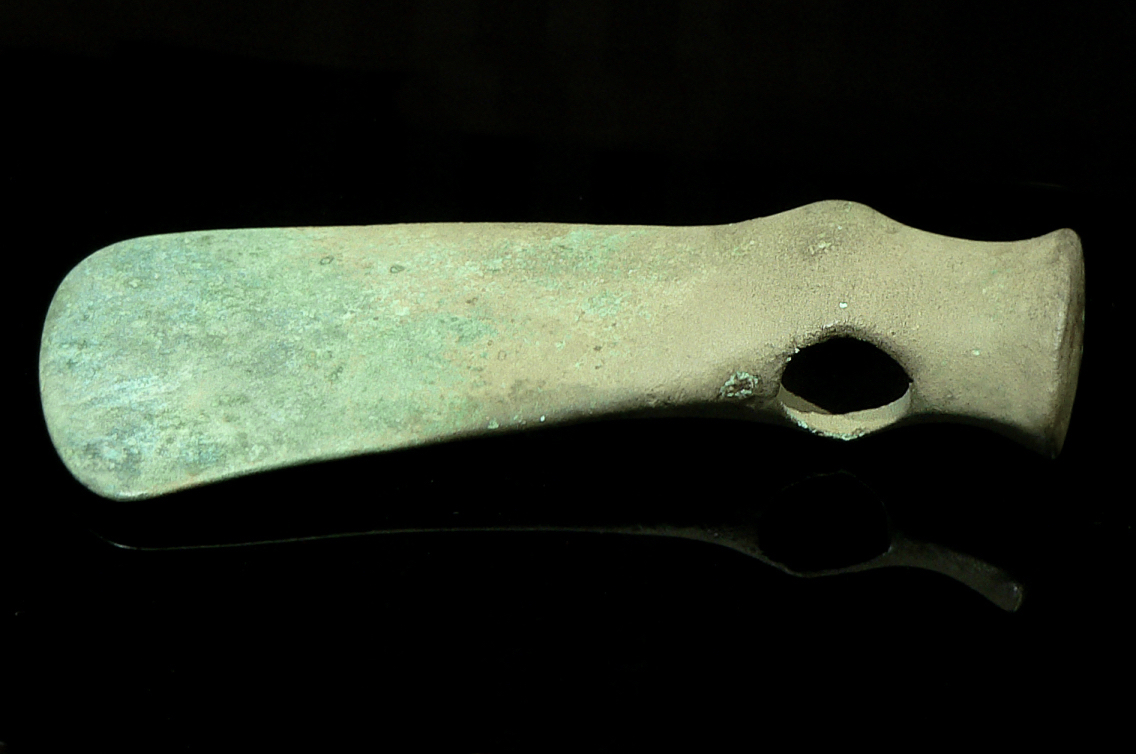
Copper axe from Lüstringen, Germany, c. 4000 BCE

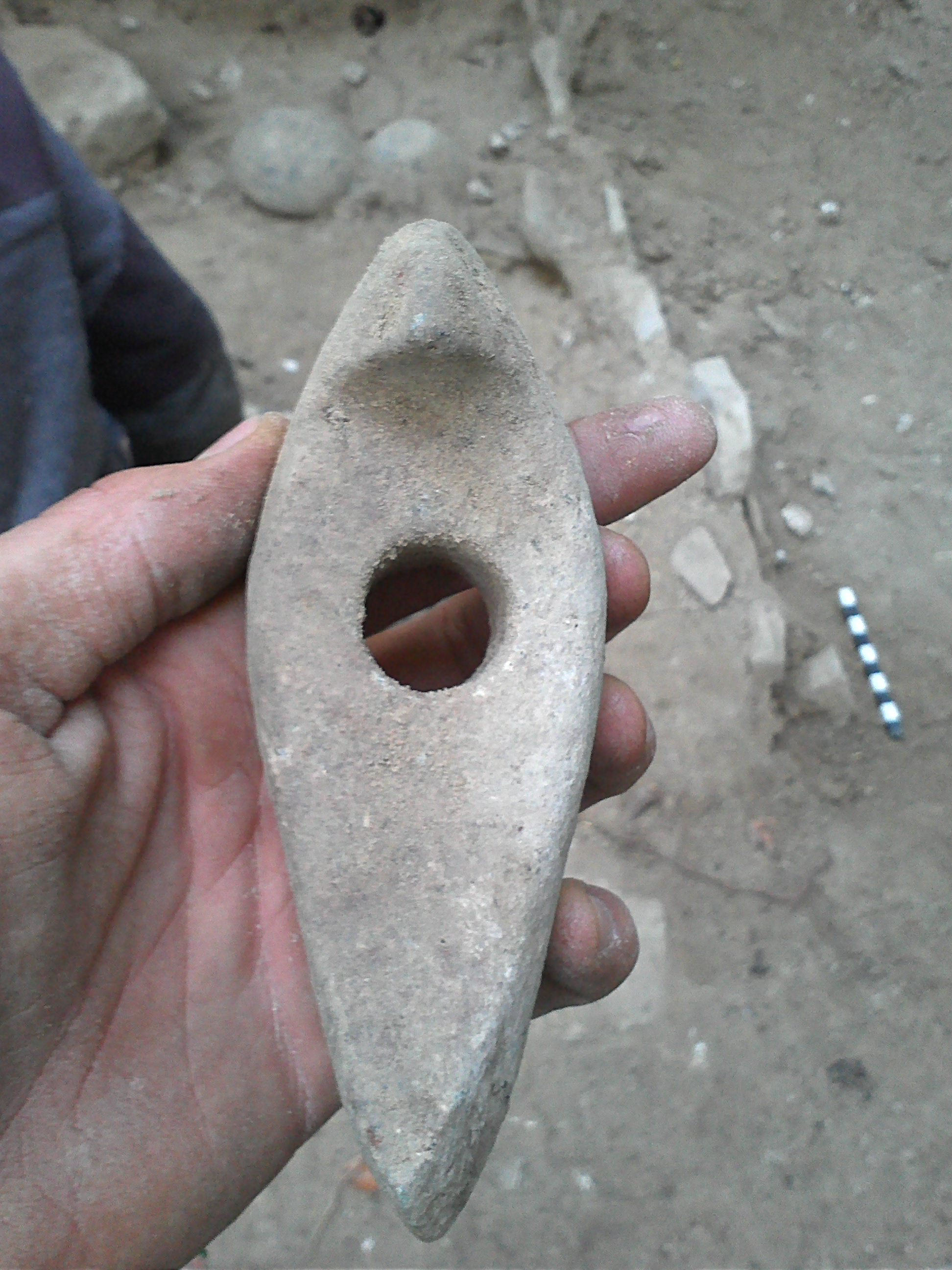
A double axe found in a megalithic tomb

=== Graves ===
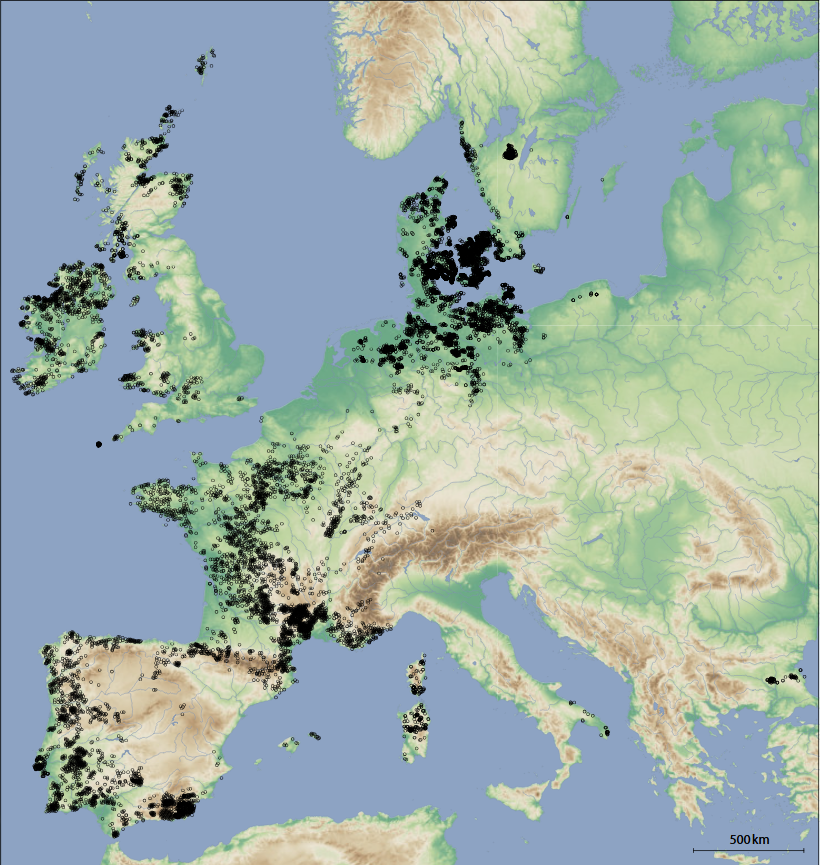
Recent map on 17,409 registrered megalithic graves of Europe, c. 5000 - 1500 BCE

Houses were centered on a monumental grave, a symbol of social cohesion. Burial practices were varied depending on region and changed over time. Inhumation seems to have been the rule.

The oldest graves consisted of wooden chambered cairns inside long barrows, but were later made in the form of passage graves and dolmens. Originally, the structures were probably covered with a mound of earth and the entrance was blocked by a stone.

Before medieval and modern church building required stone, and before modern land use began, the number of megaliths in northern Germany and southern Scandinavia was much higher than today. In Denmark, 2,800 monuments have been recorded, and about 7,300 other examples existed. In northern Germany, Johannes Müller reports 11,658 known monuments. He assumes that about 75,000 megaliths were originally constructed.

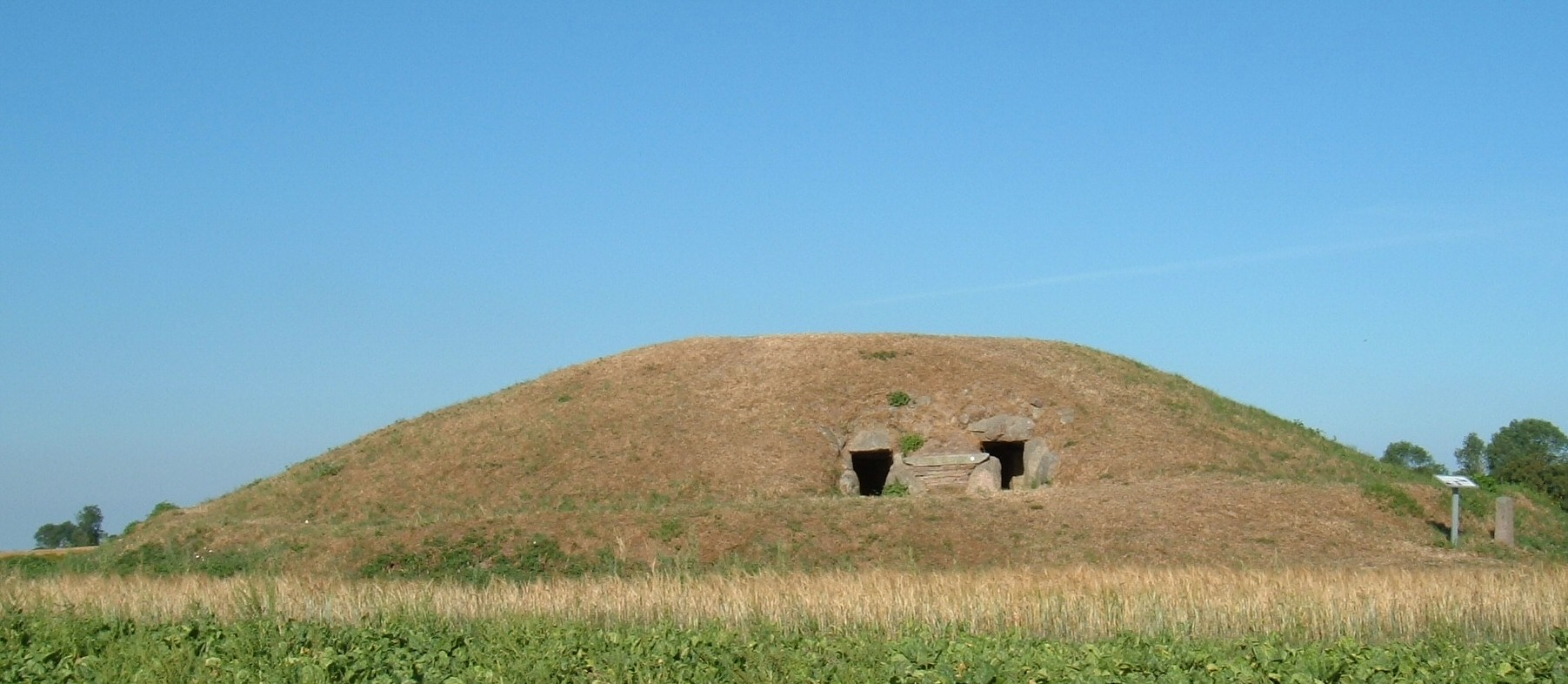
Klekkende Høj barrow, Denmark, c. 3500-2800 BCE

The Funnelbeaker culture marks the appearance of megalithic tombs at the coasts of the Baltic and of the North sea, an example of which are the Sieben Steinhäuser in northern Germany. The megalithic structures of Ireland, France and Portugal are somewhat older and have been connected to earlier archeological cultures of those areas. At graves, the people sacrificed ceramic vessels that contained food along with amber jewelry and flint-axes.

Genetic analysis of several dozen individuals found in the Funnelbeaker passage grave Frälsegården in Sweden suggest that these burials were based on a patrilineal social organisation, with the vast majority of males being ultimately descended from a single male ancestor while the women were mostly unrelated who presumably married into the family.

=== Religion ===
Flint-axes and vessels were also deposited in streams and lakes near the farmlands, and virtually all of Sweden's 10,000 flint axes that have been found from this culture were probably sacrificed in water. They also constructed large cult centres surrounded by pales, earthworks and moats. The largest one is found at Sarup on Fyn. It comprises 85,000 m^{2} and is estimated to have taken 8000 workdays. Another cult centre at Stävie near Lund comprises 30,000 m^{2}. There is limited evidence of the presence of female funerary societies involving feasting and ritual drinking of milk.

== Ethnicity ==
In the context of the Kurgan hypothesis (or steppe hypothesis), the culture is seen as non-Indo-European, representing a culture of Neolithic origin, as opposed to the Indo-European-language-speaking peoples (see Yamna culture) who later intruded from the east.

Marija Gimbutas postulated that the political relationship between the aboriginal and intrusive cultures resulted in quick and smooth cultural morphosis into the Corded Ware culture.

In the past, a number of other archaeologists proposed that the Corded Ware culture was a purely local development of the Funnelbeaker culture, but genetic evidence has since demonstrated that this was not the case.

== Gallery ==
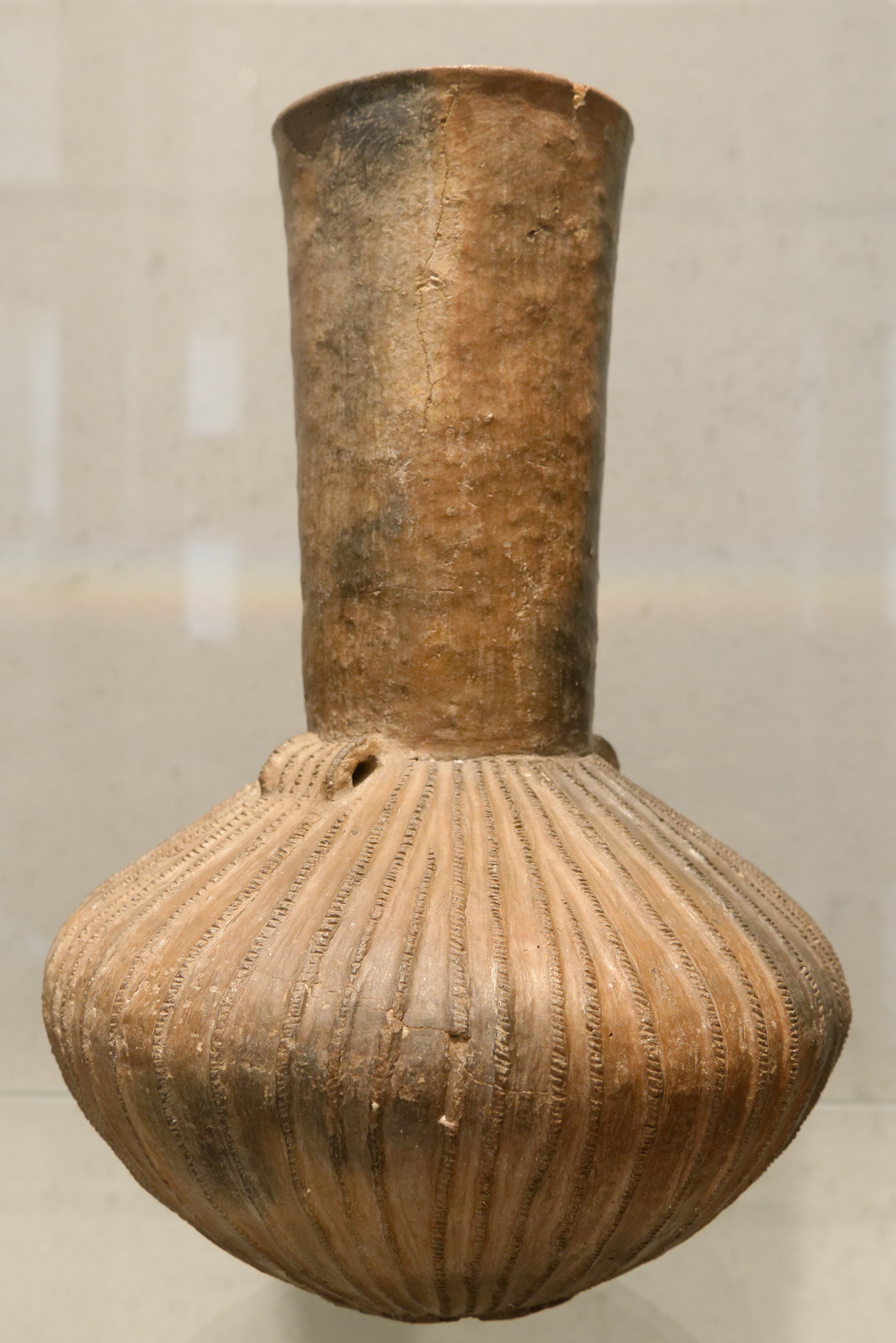
Pottery, Denmark

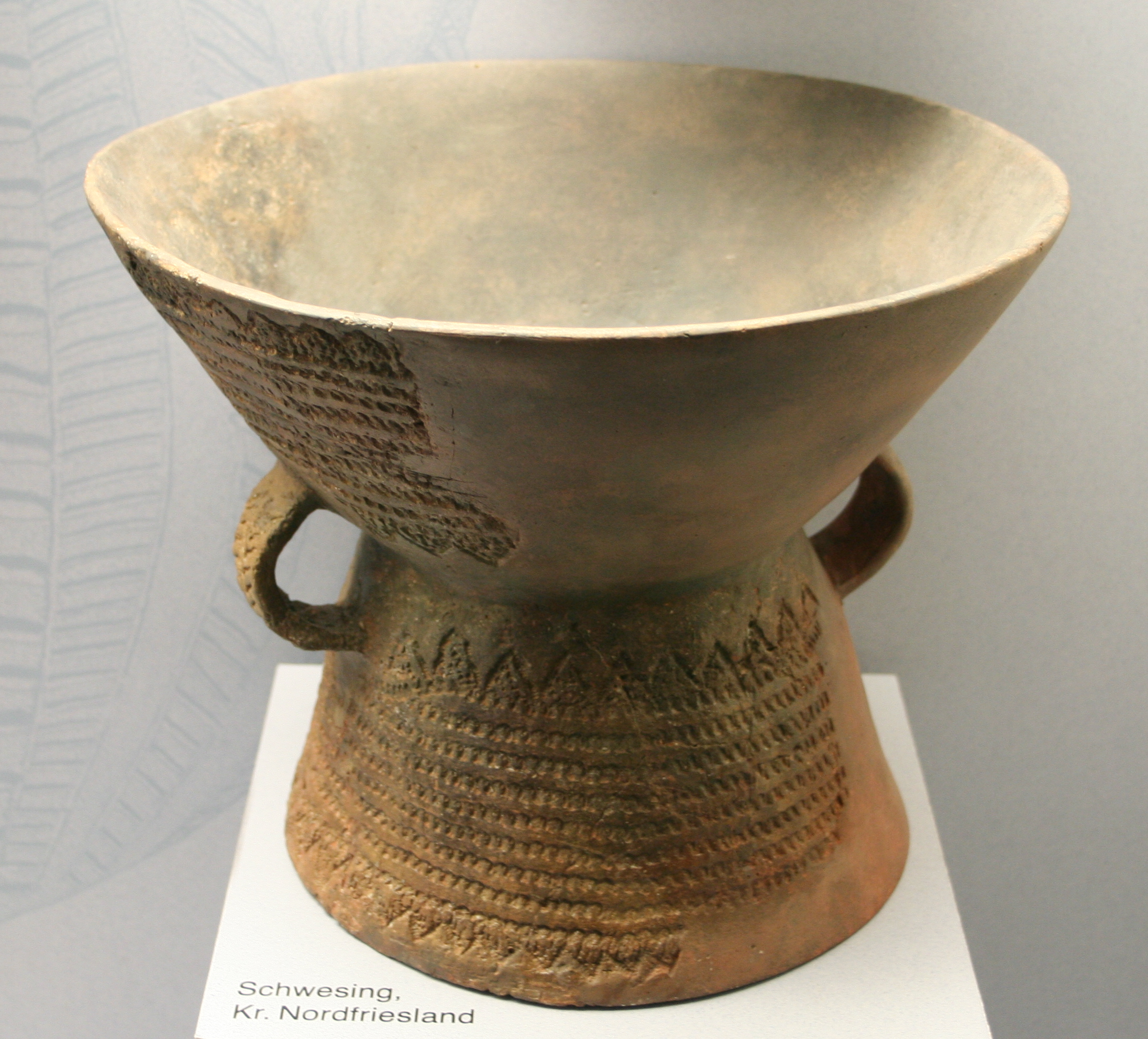
Pottery, Germany

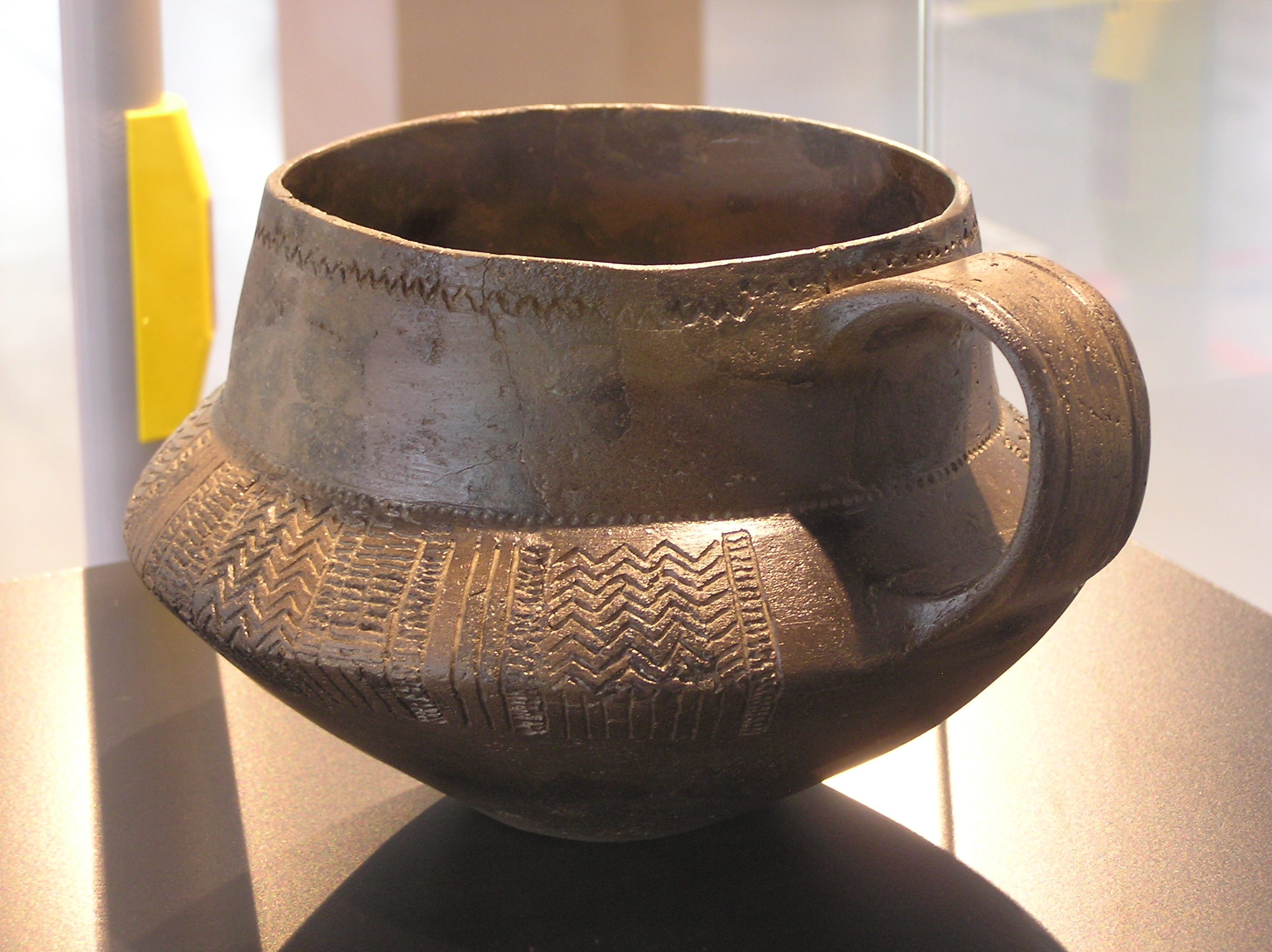
Pottery, Germany

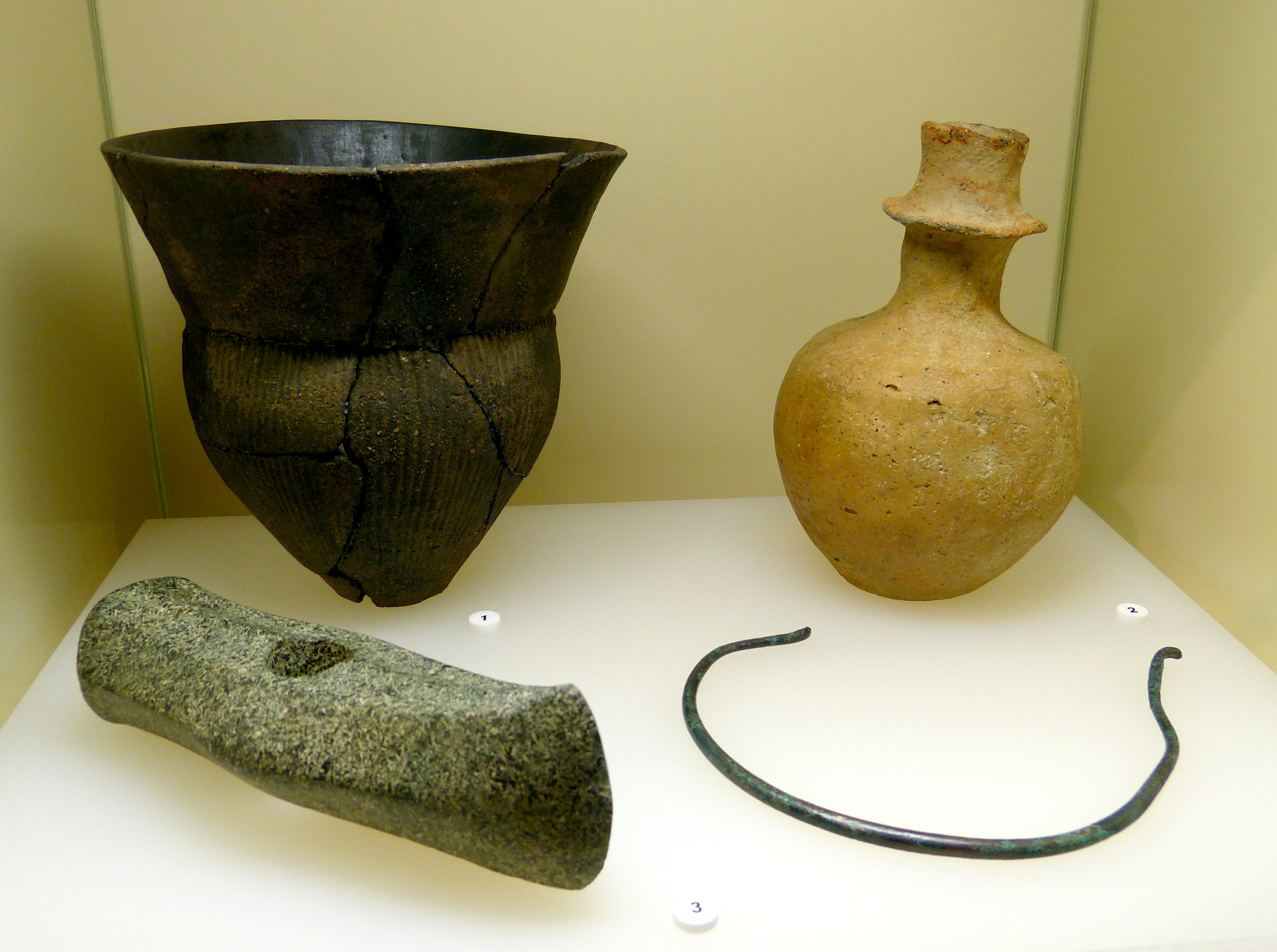
Pottery, stone axe, copper necklace

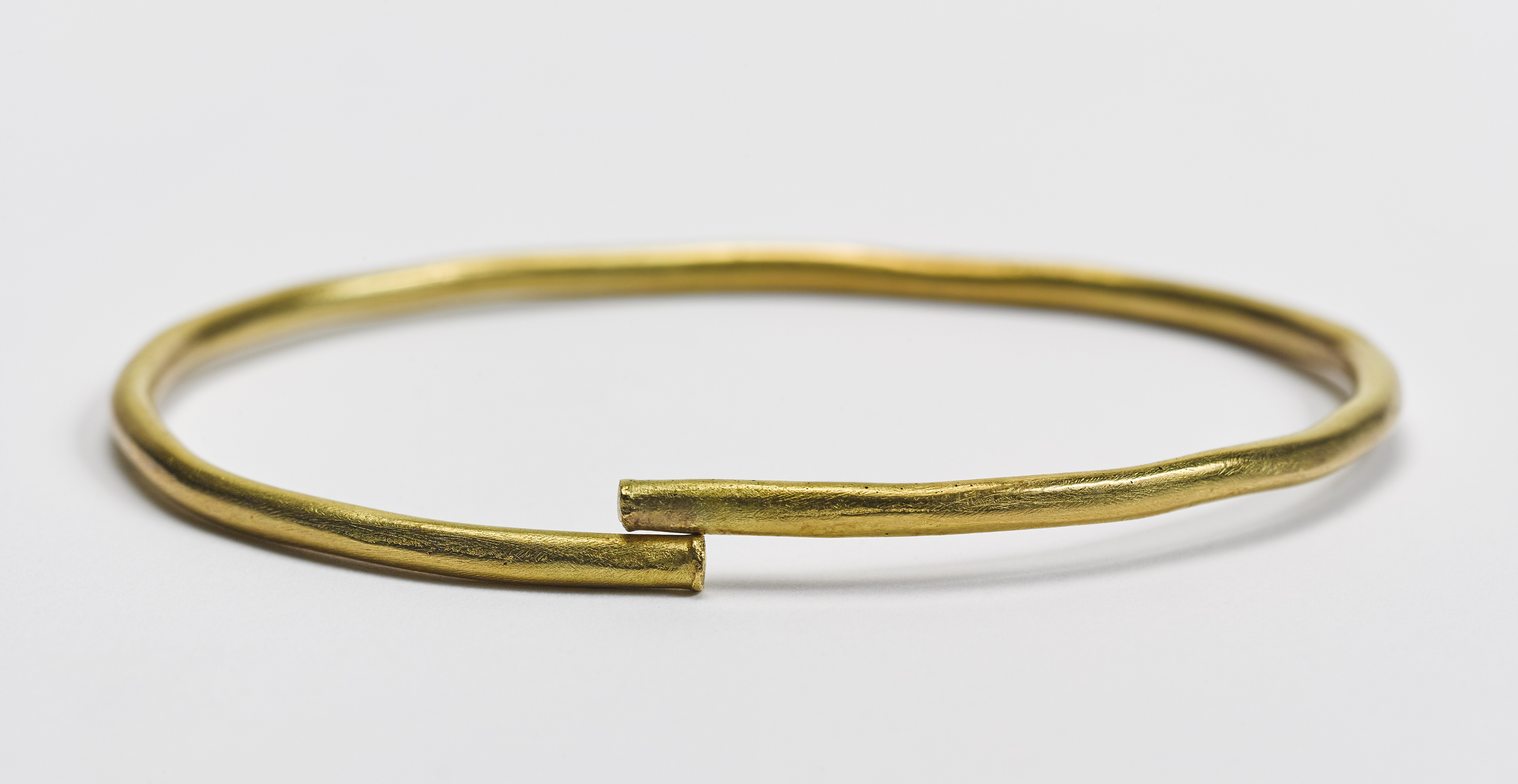
Gold armring, Germany, c.3500 BCE

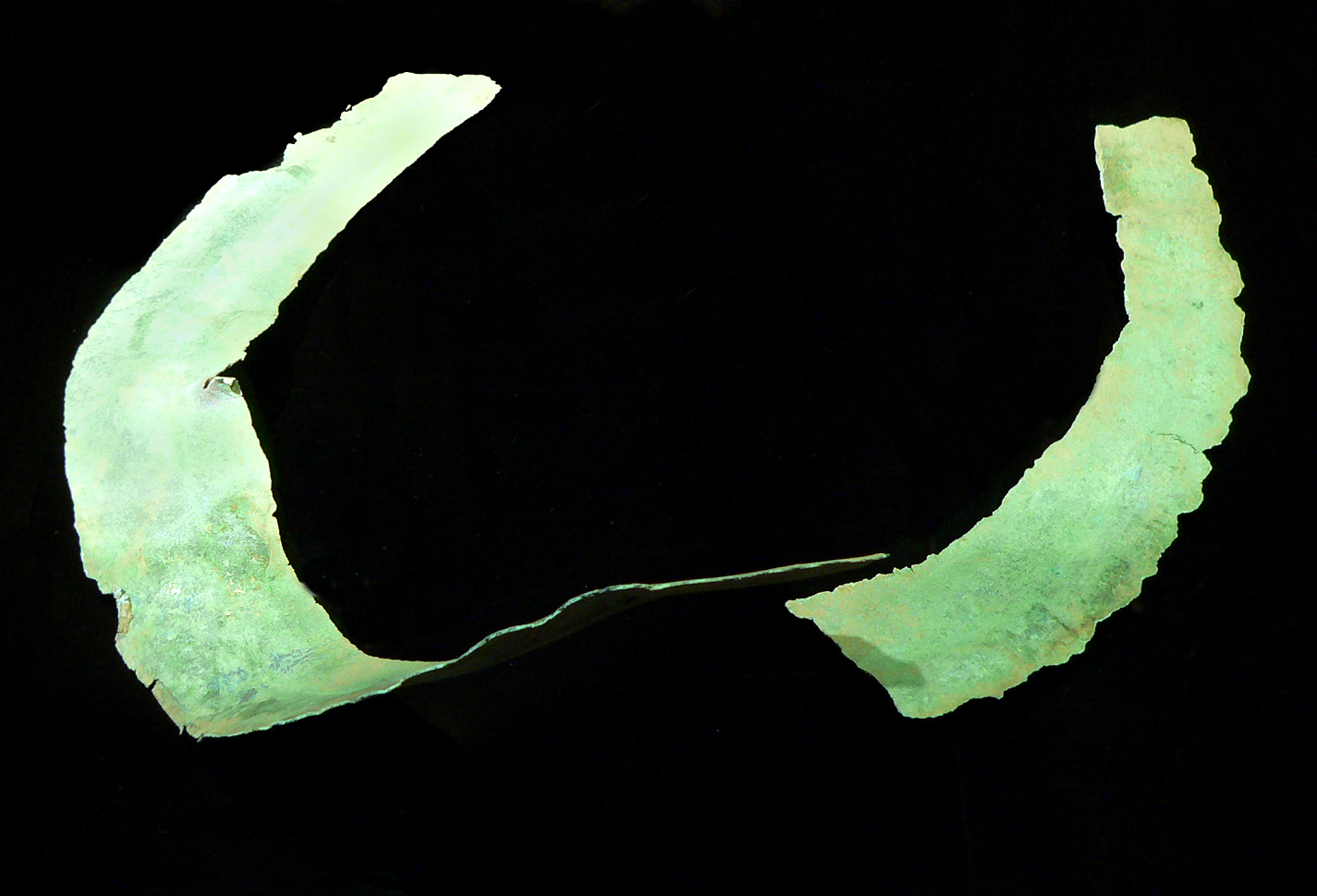
Copper lunula from Lüstringen, Germany, c. 4000 BCE

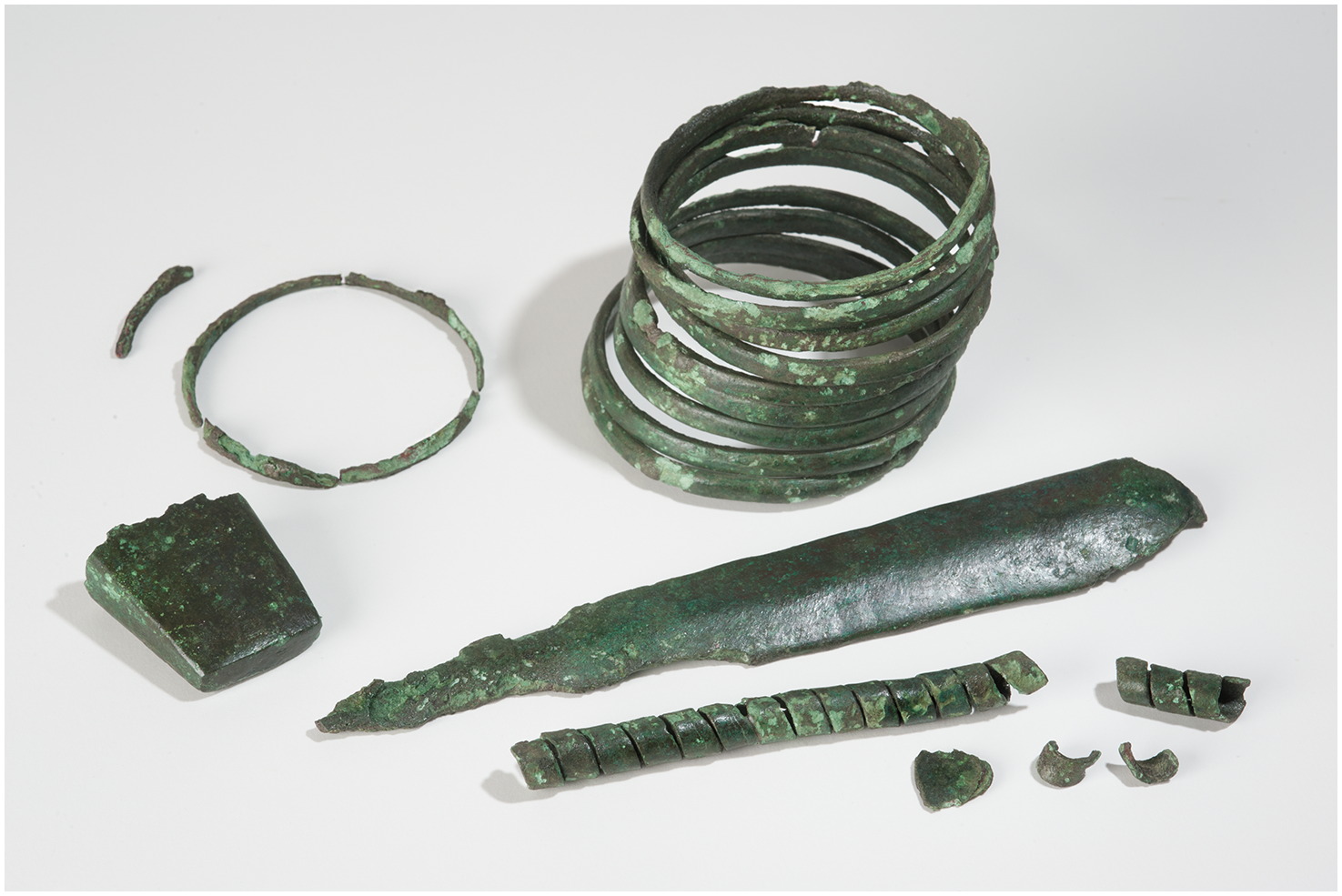
Neuenkirchen Hoard copper artefacts, Germany, c. 3800 BCE

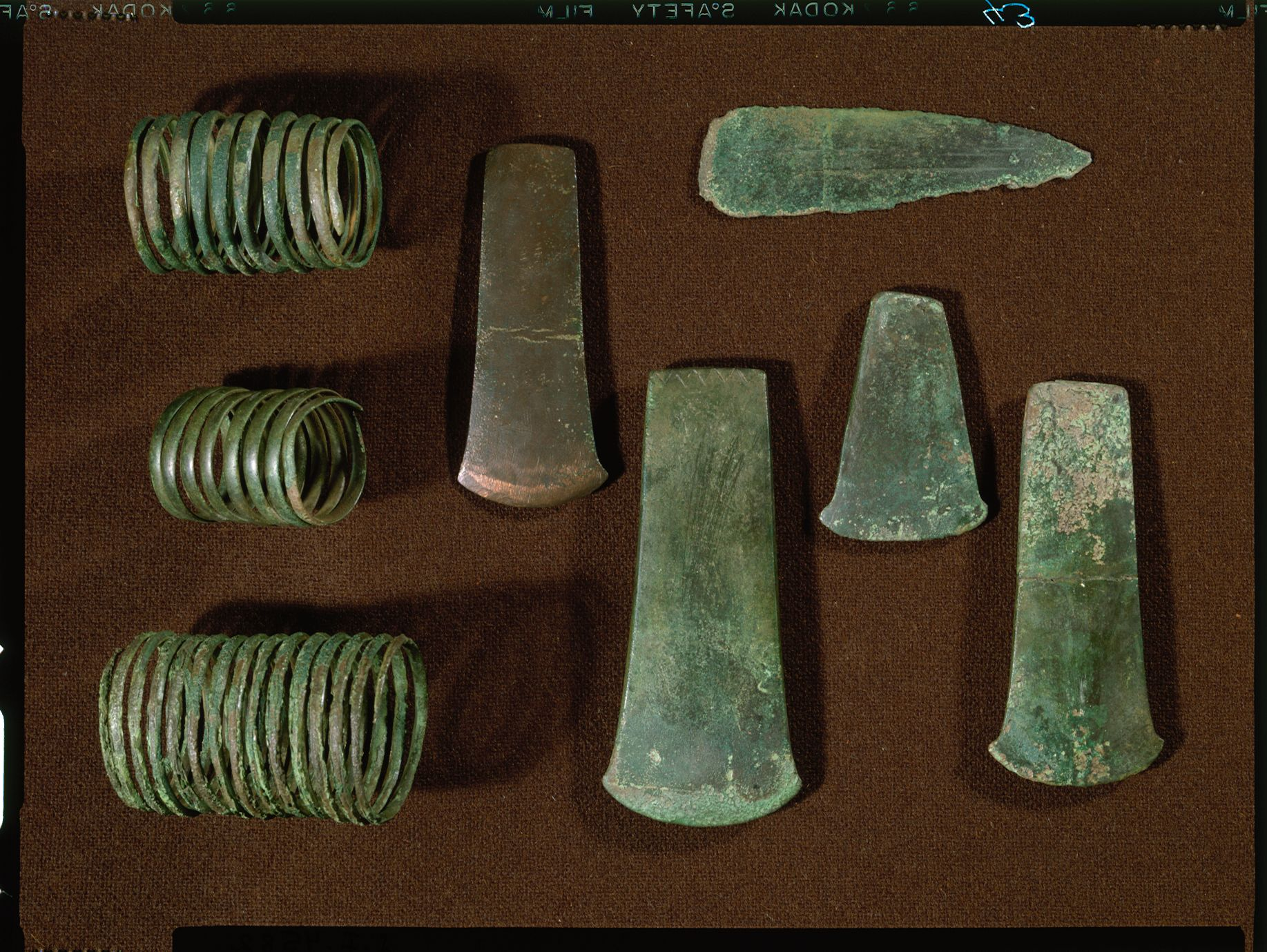
Copper axes, spirals and blade, Denmark, c. 3500 BC

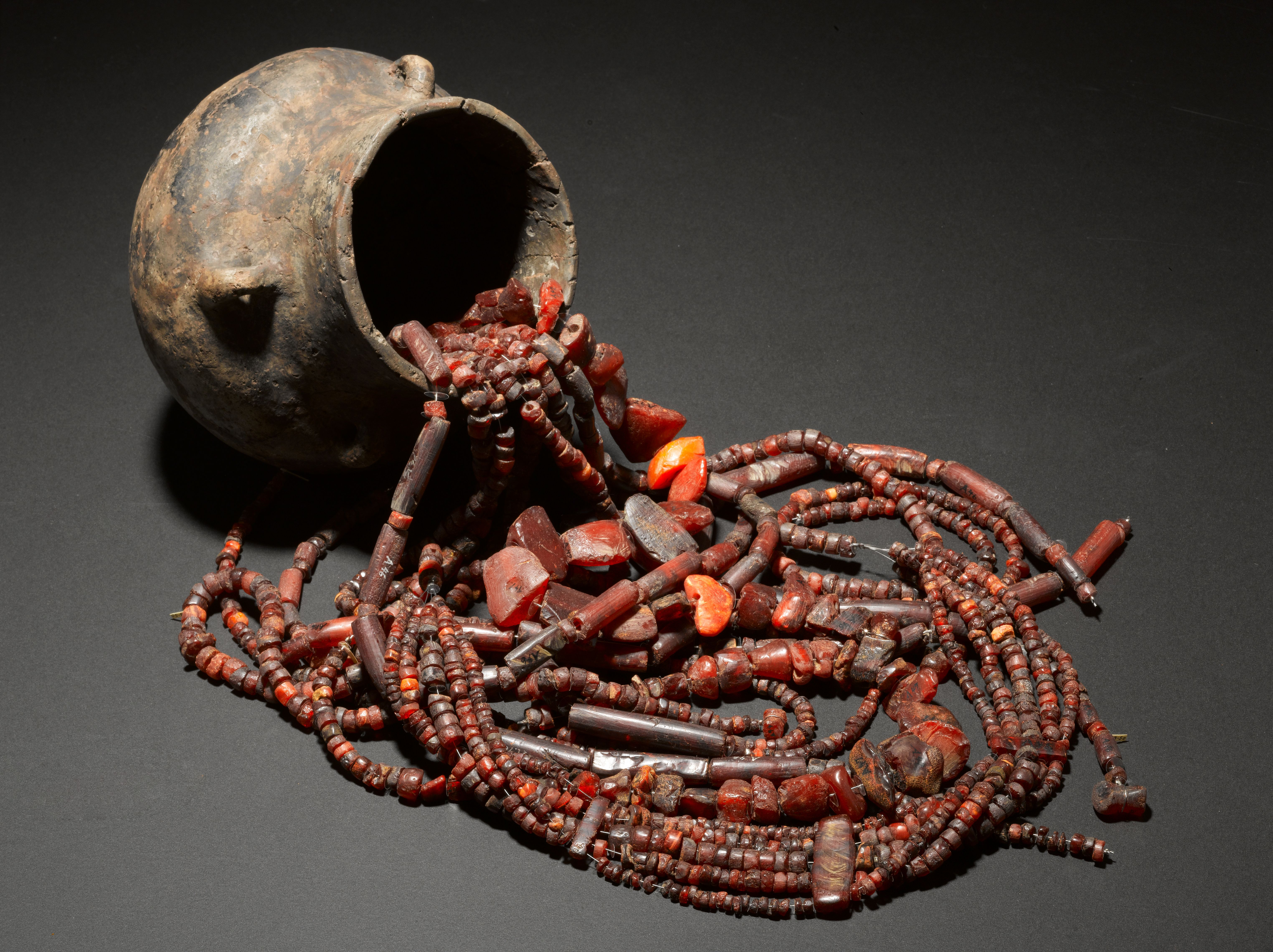
Amber necklaces, Denmark.

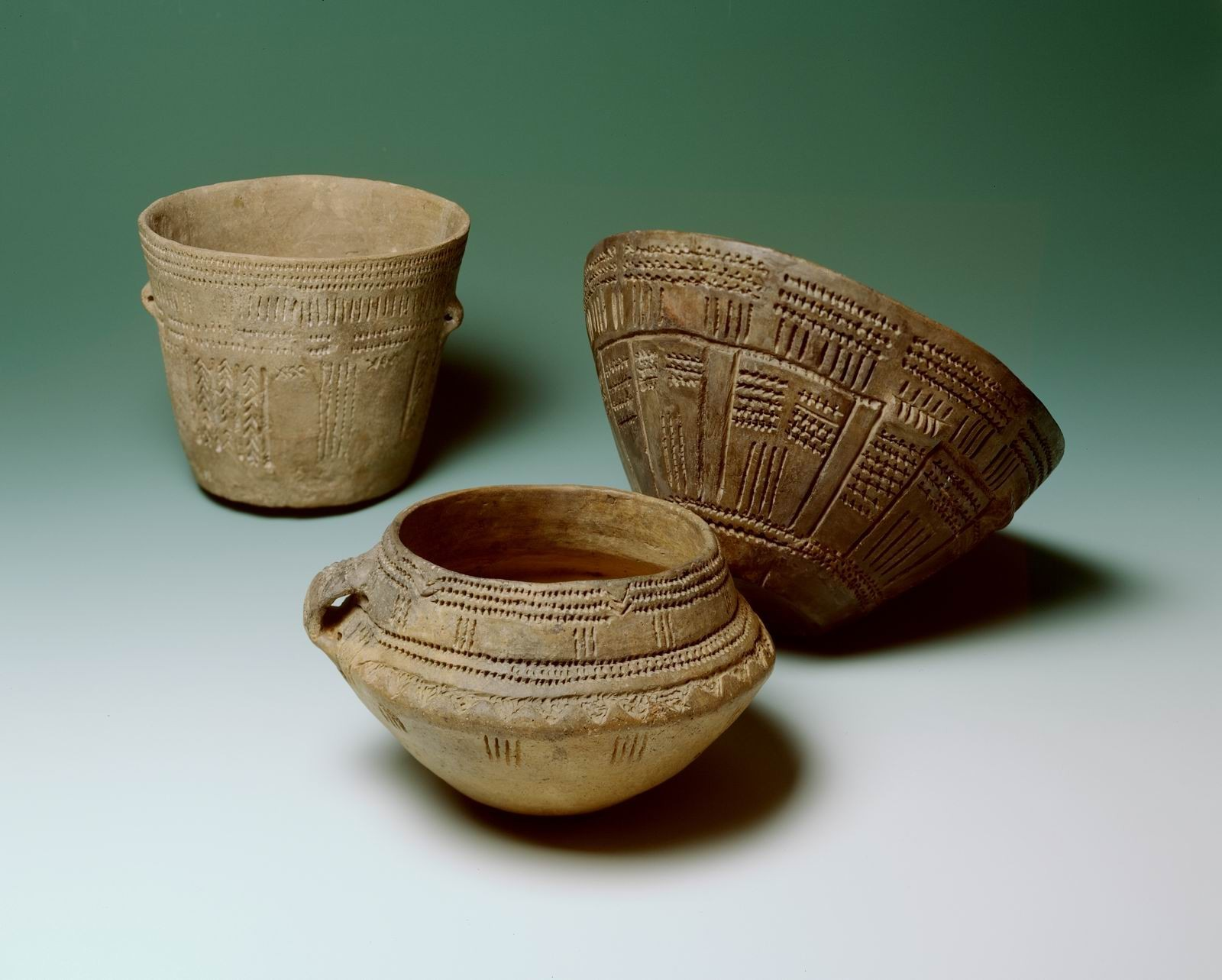
Pottery, Netherlands

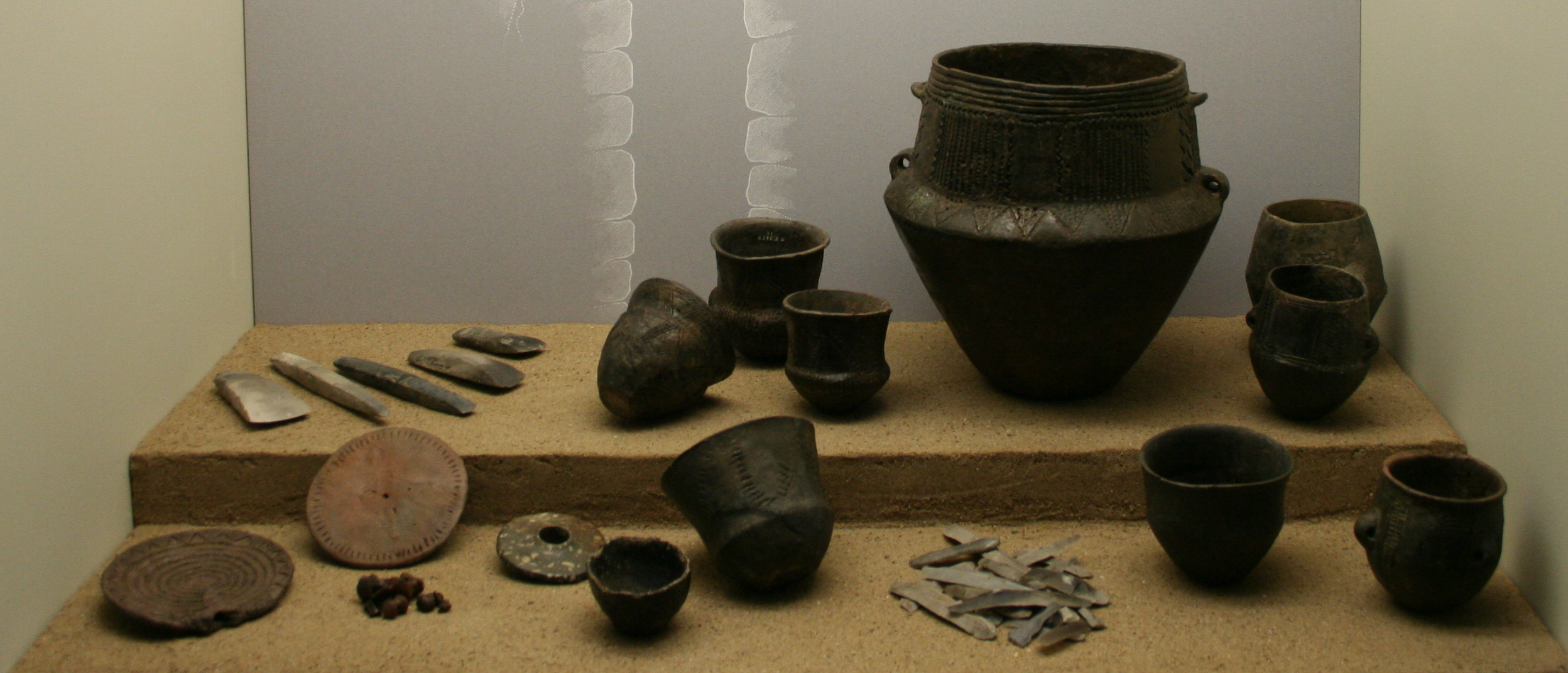
Various artefacts, Germany

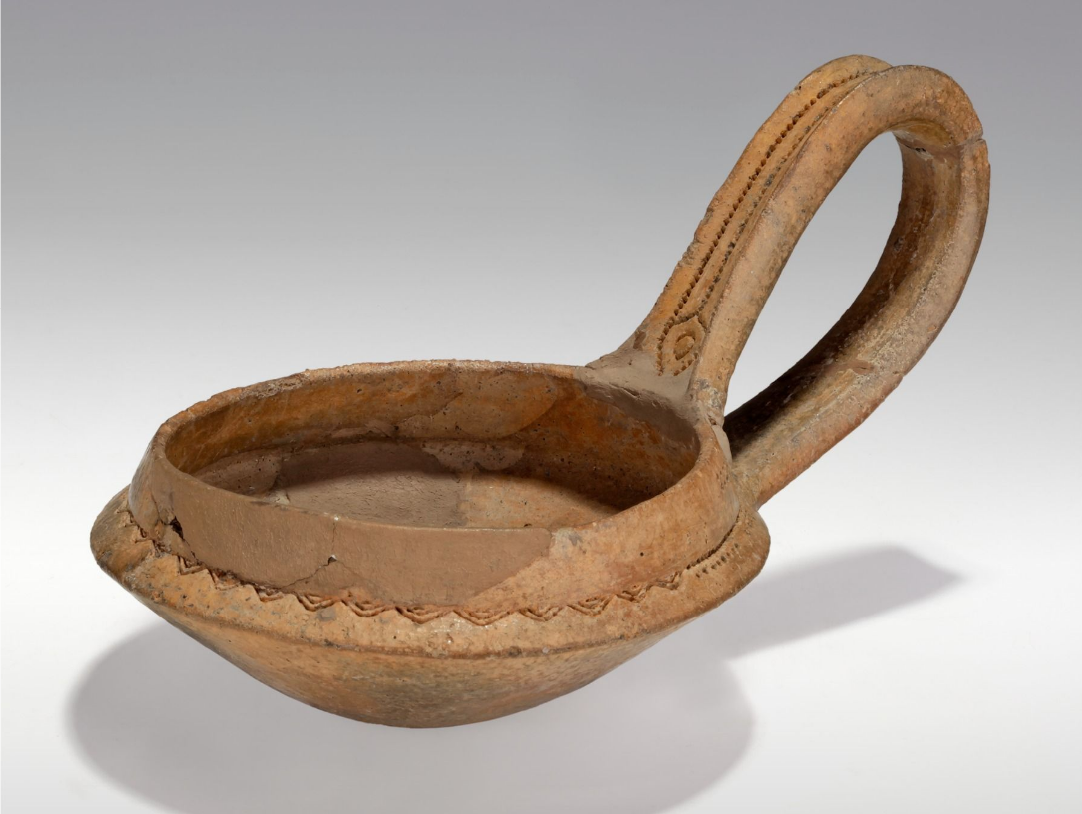
Ceramic cup, Germany

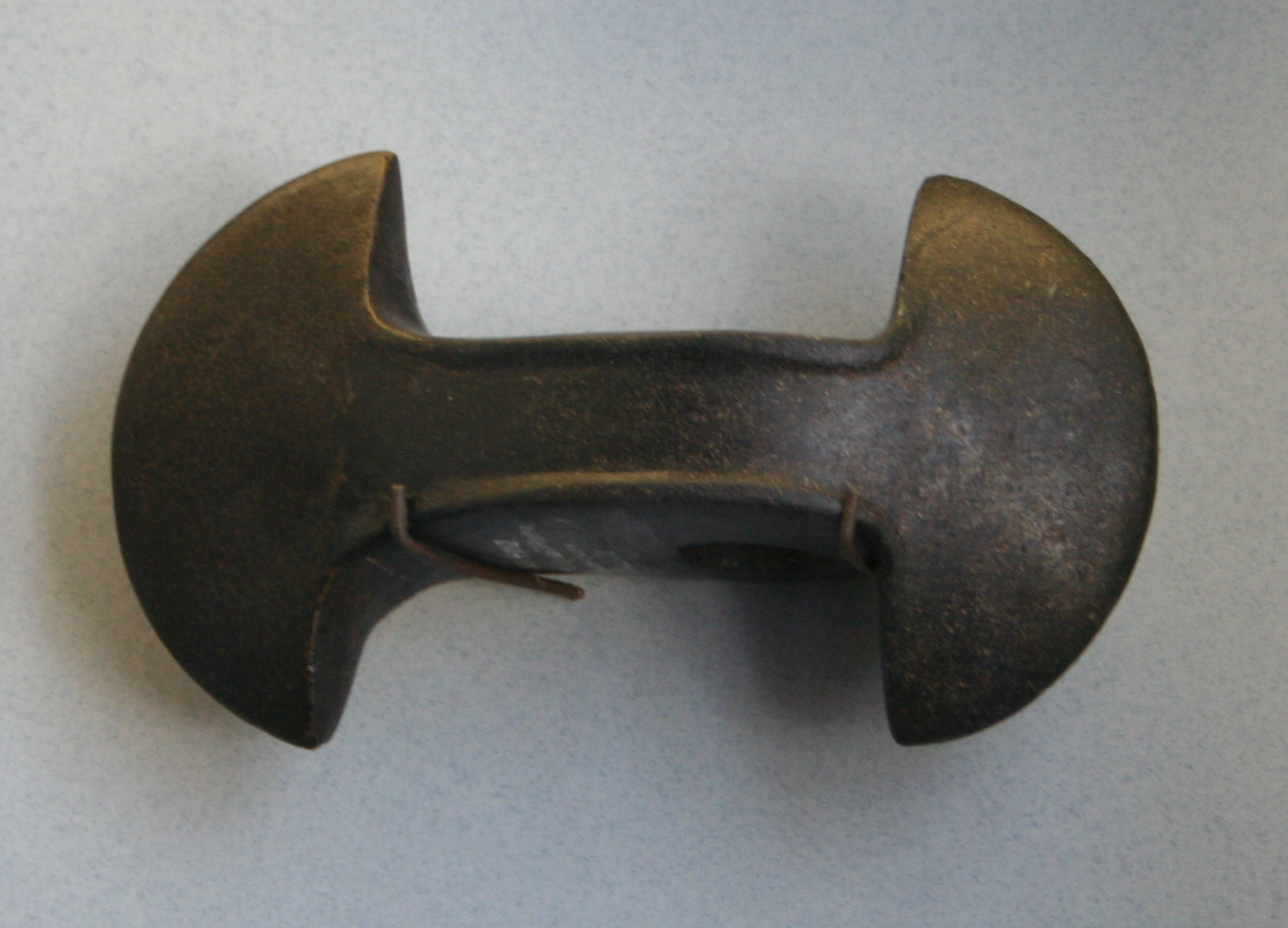
Stone double-axe, Germany

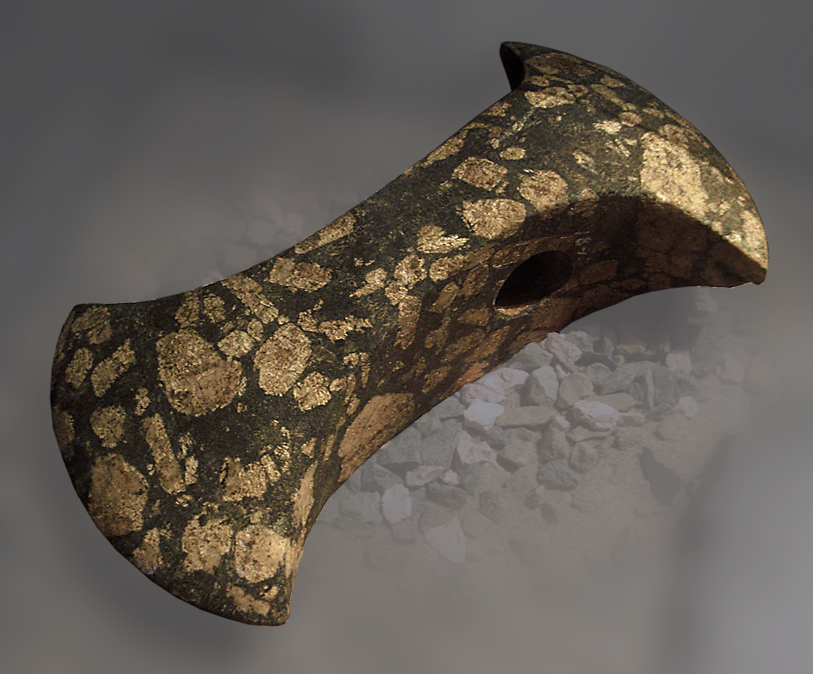
Double-axe made from porphyry, Sweden

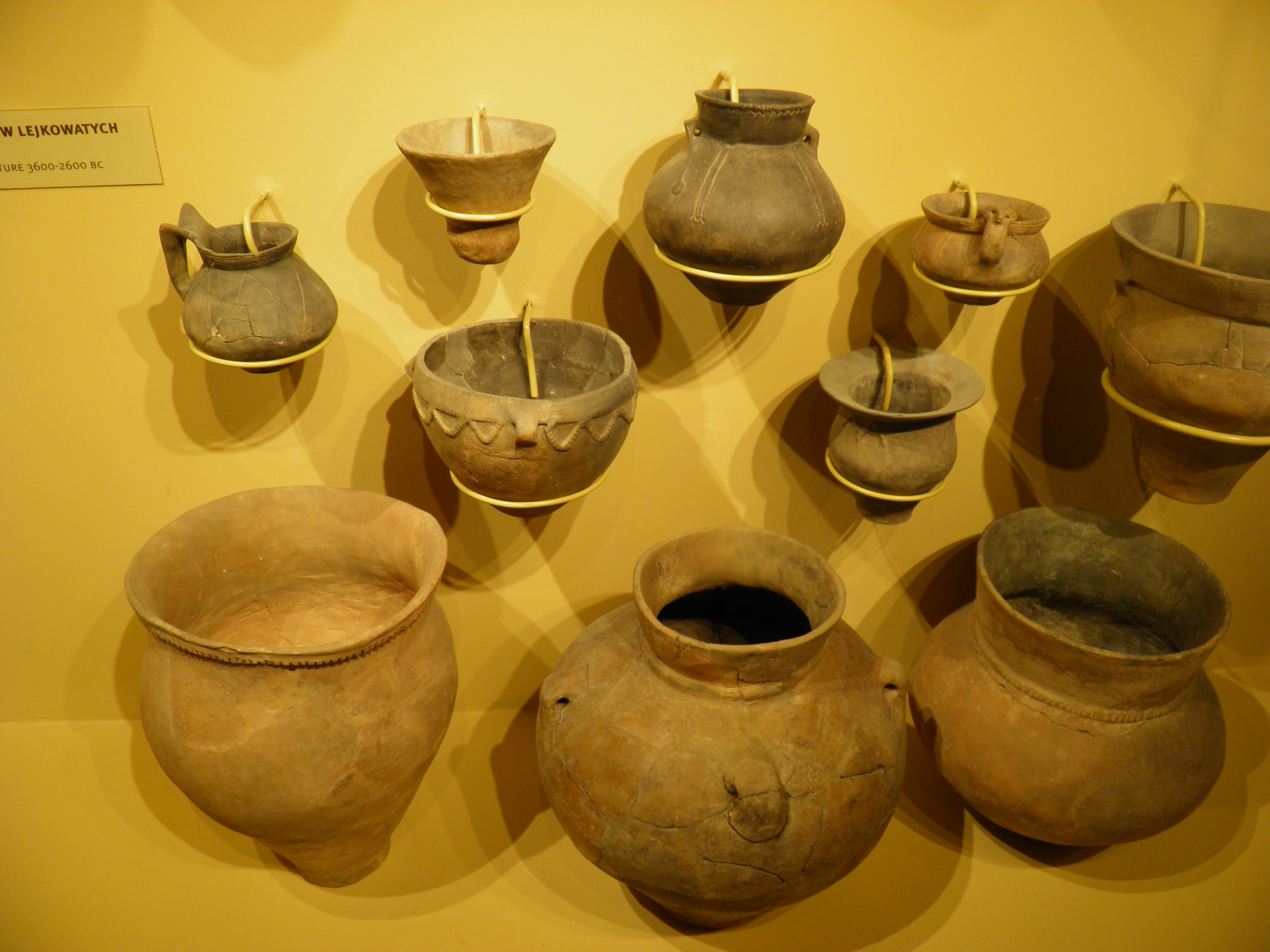
Pottery, Poland

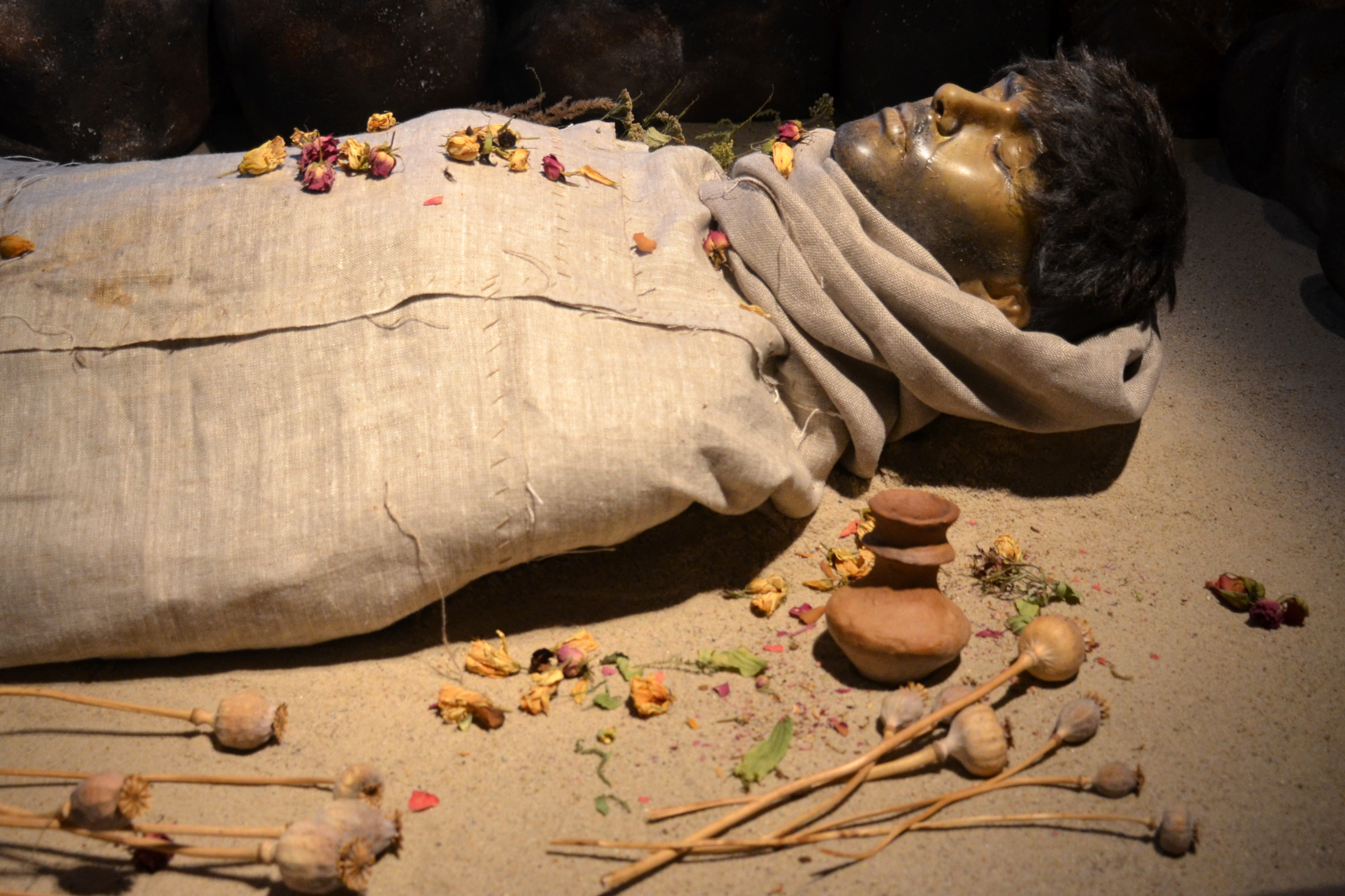
Burial with poppies, Poland. Reconstruction.

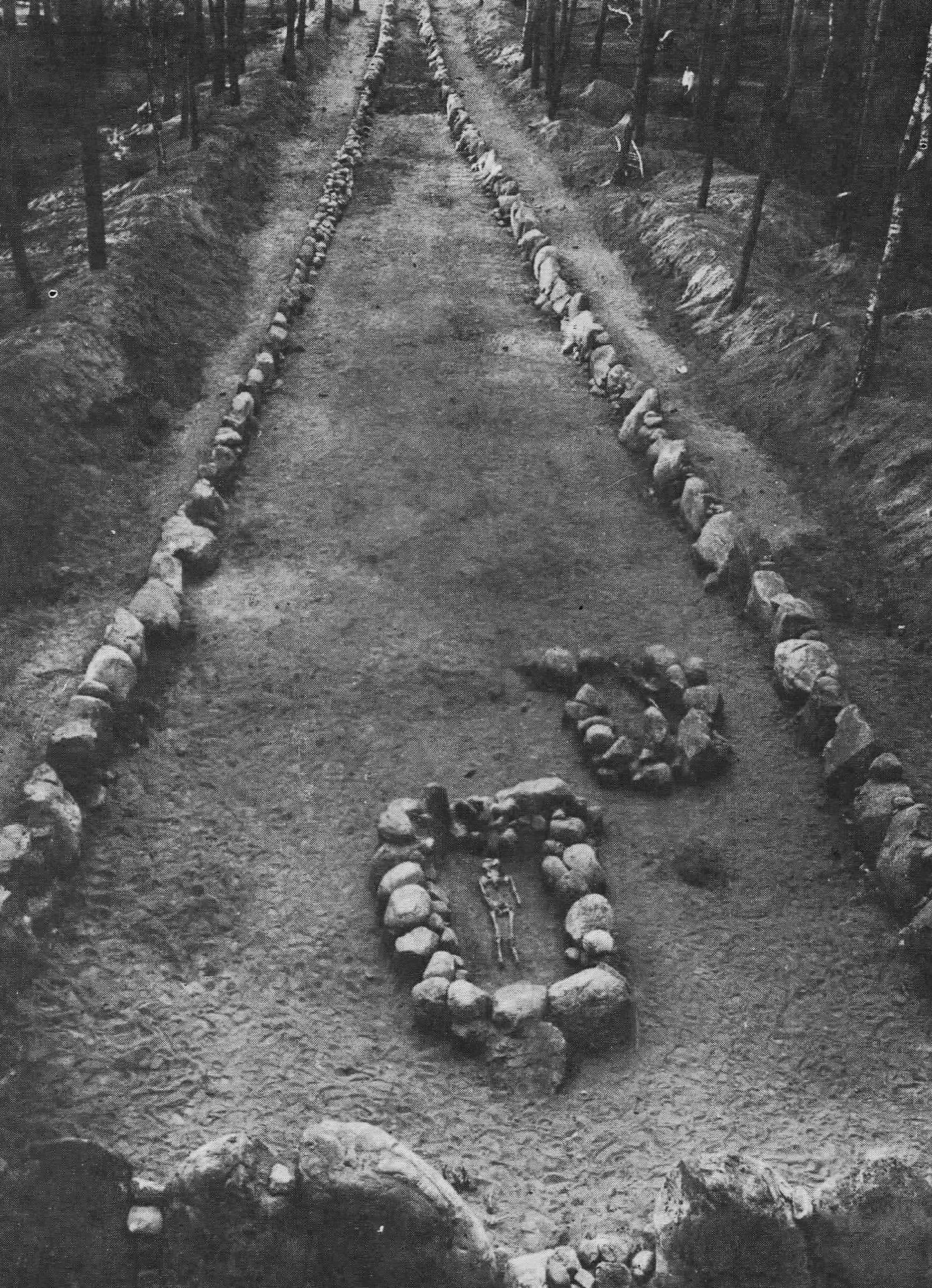
Excavated long barrow, Poland

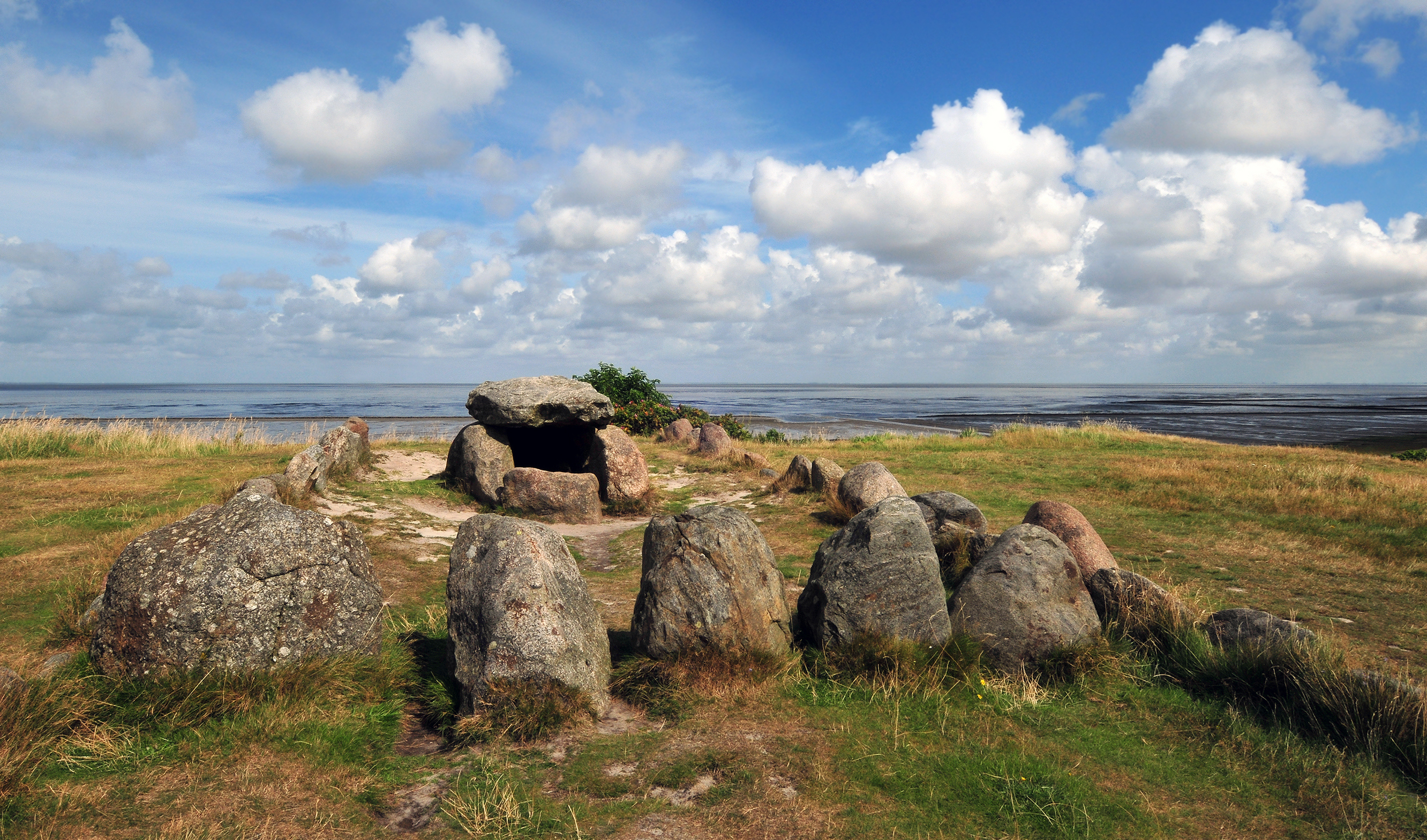
Dolmen in Harhoog

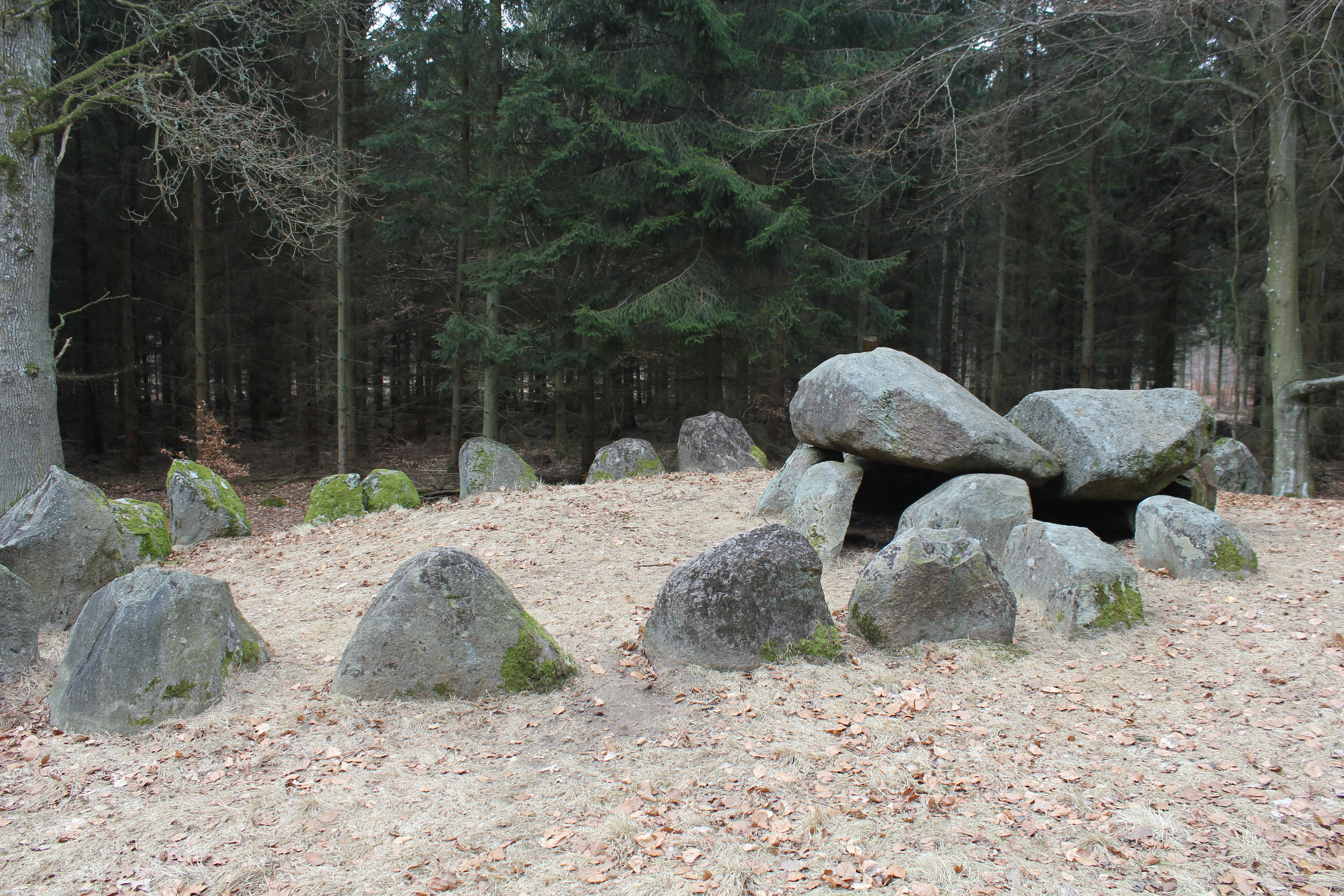
Round dolmen in Gribskov

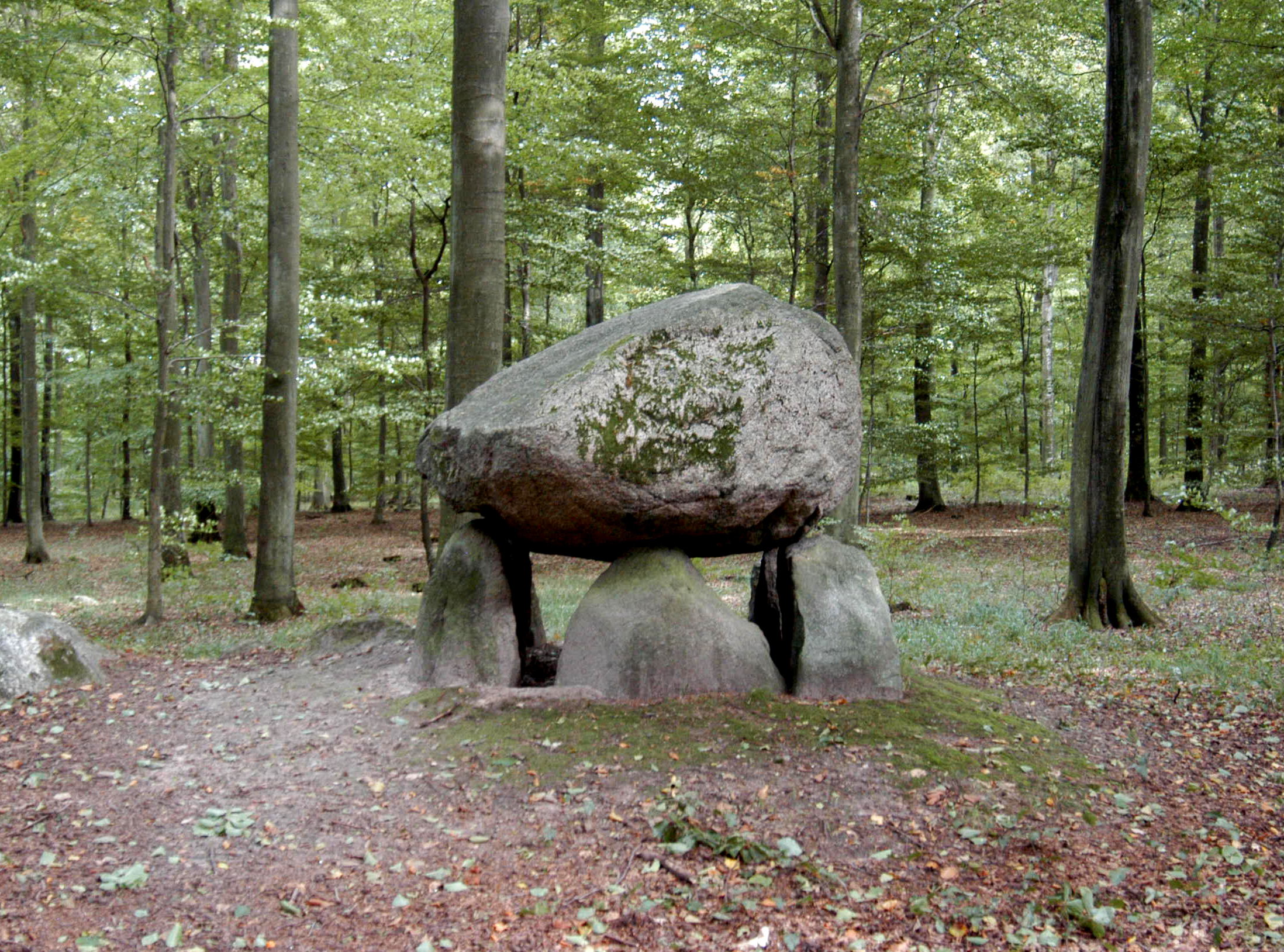
Dolmen in North Zealand

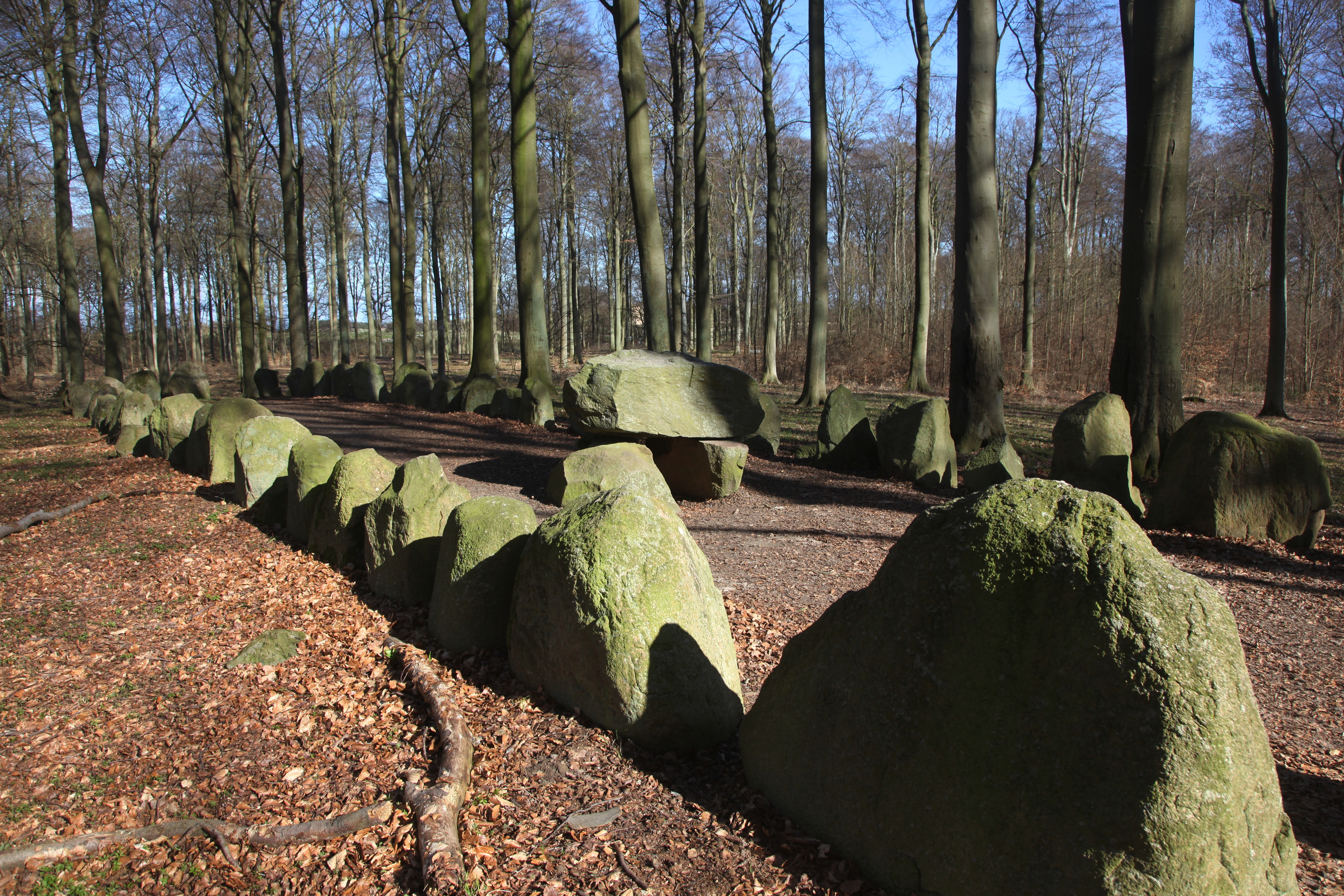
Oval or Long dolmen near Korsør

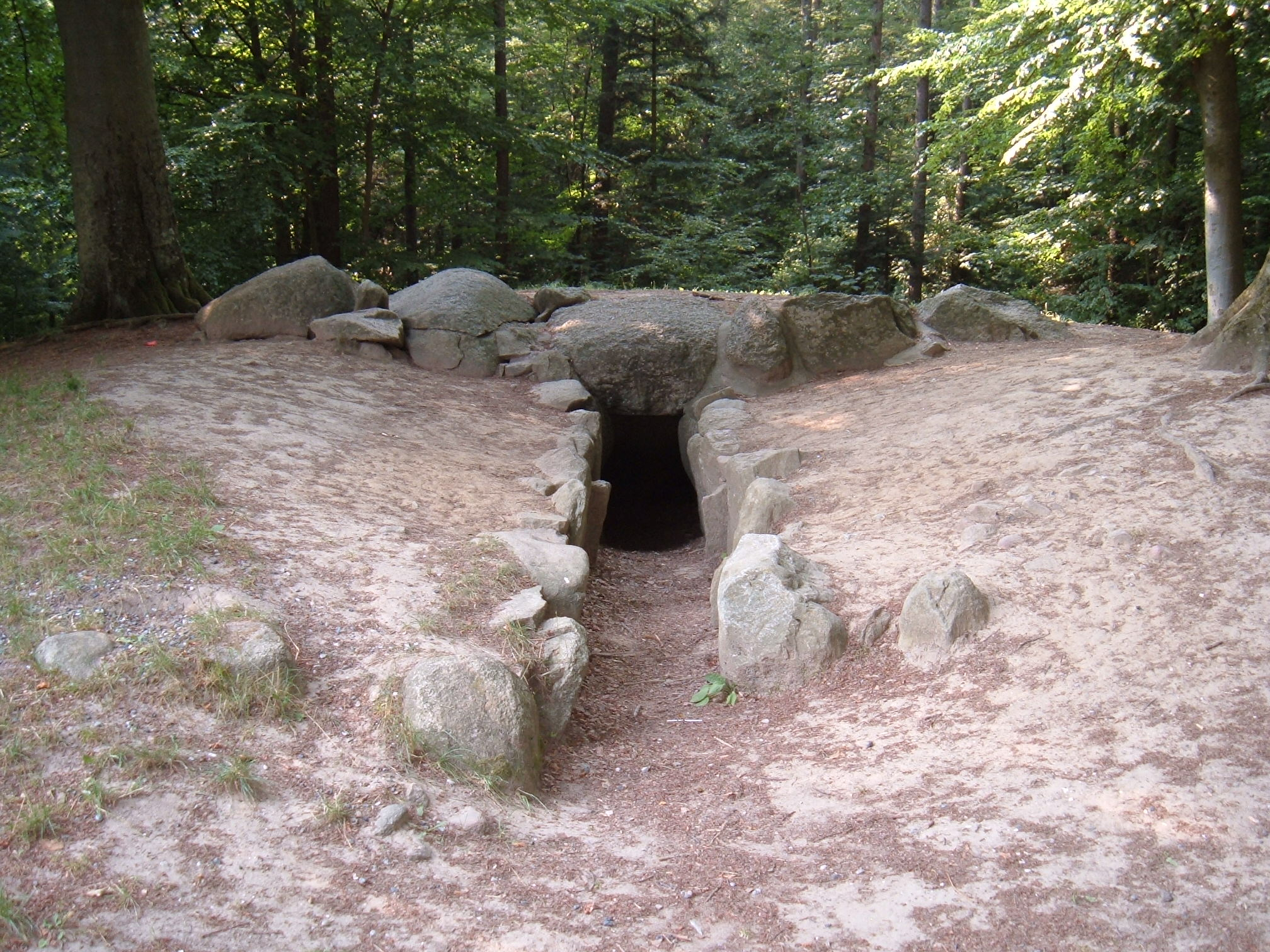
Passage grave at Hulehøj, Bogø

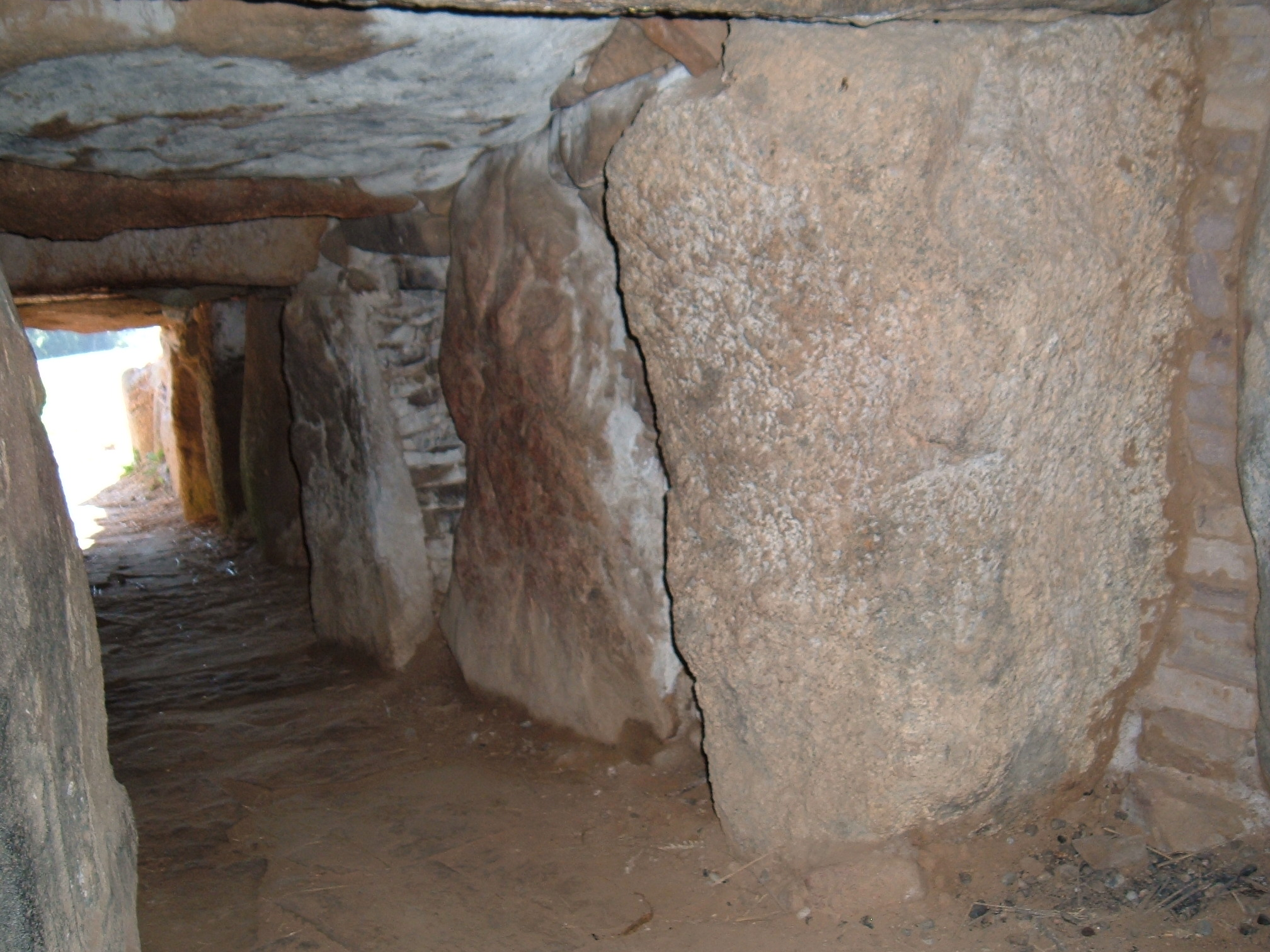
Klekkende Høj, interior

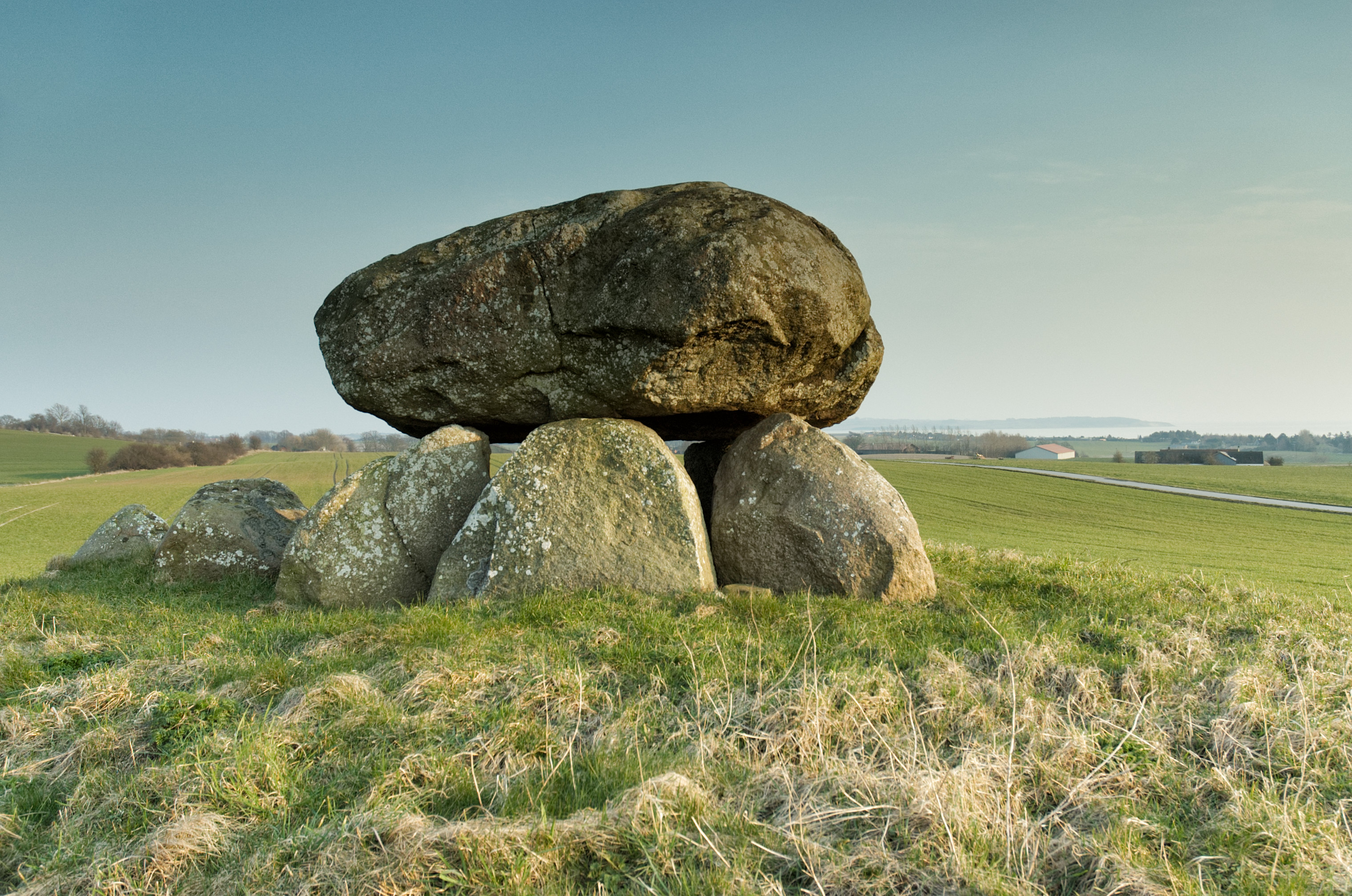
Dolmen in Mols, Denmark

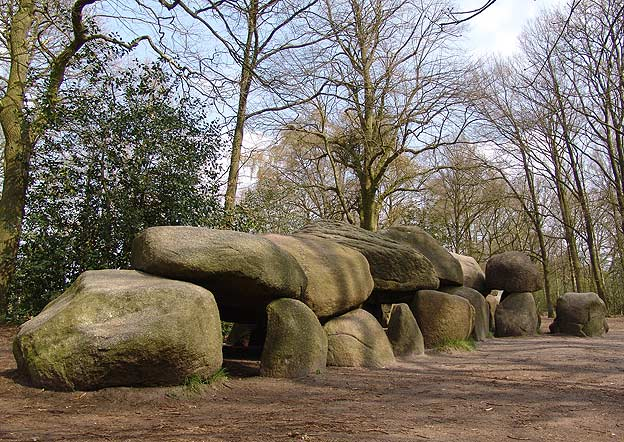
Dolmen at Borger in Netherlands

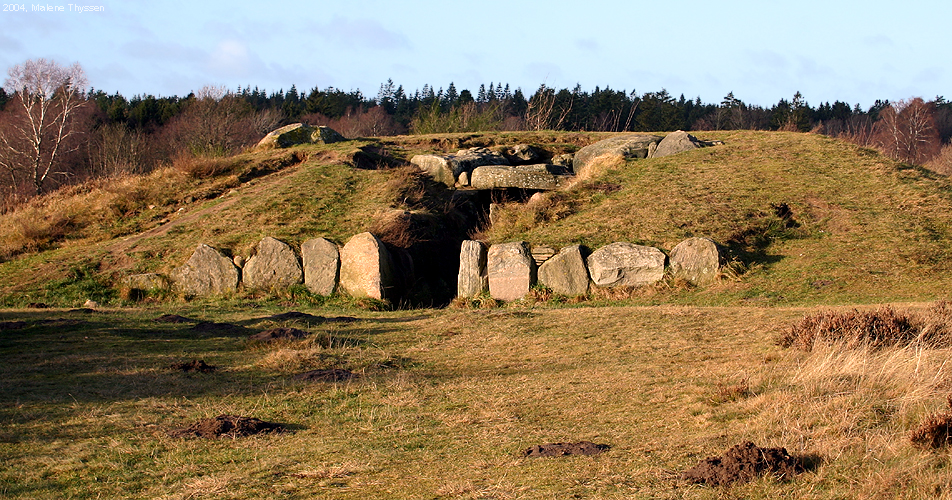
Tustrup jaettestue passage grave in Denmark

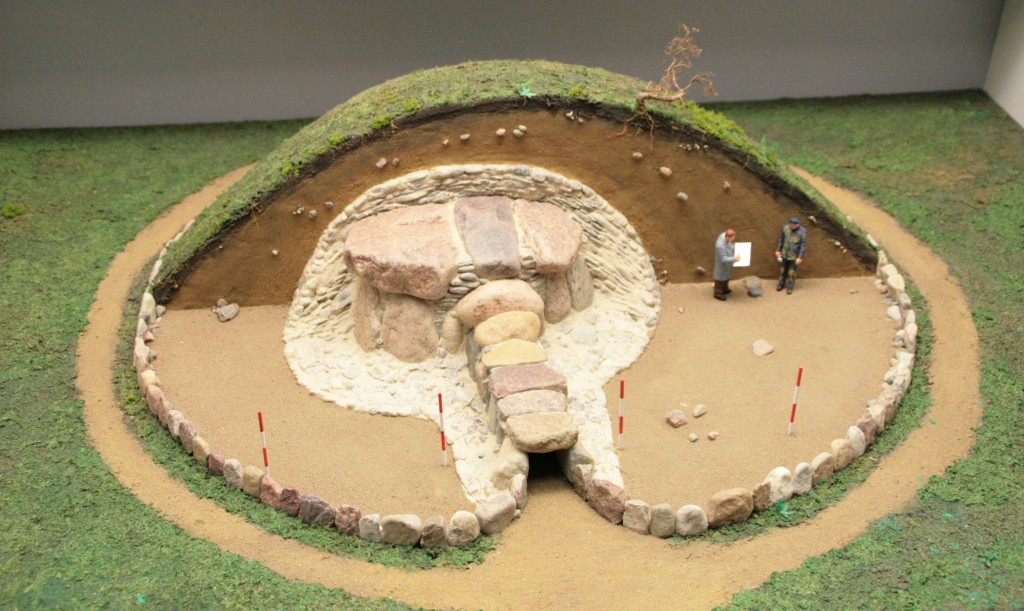
Model of the Denghoog passage grave in northern Germany

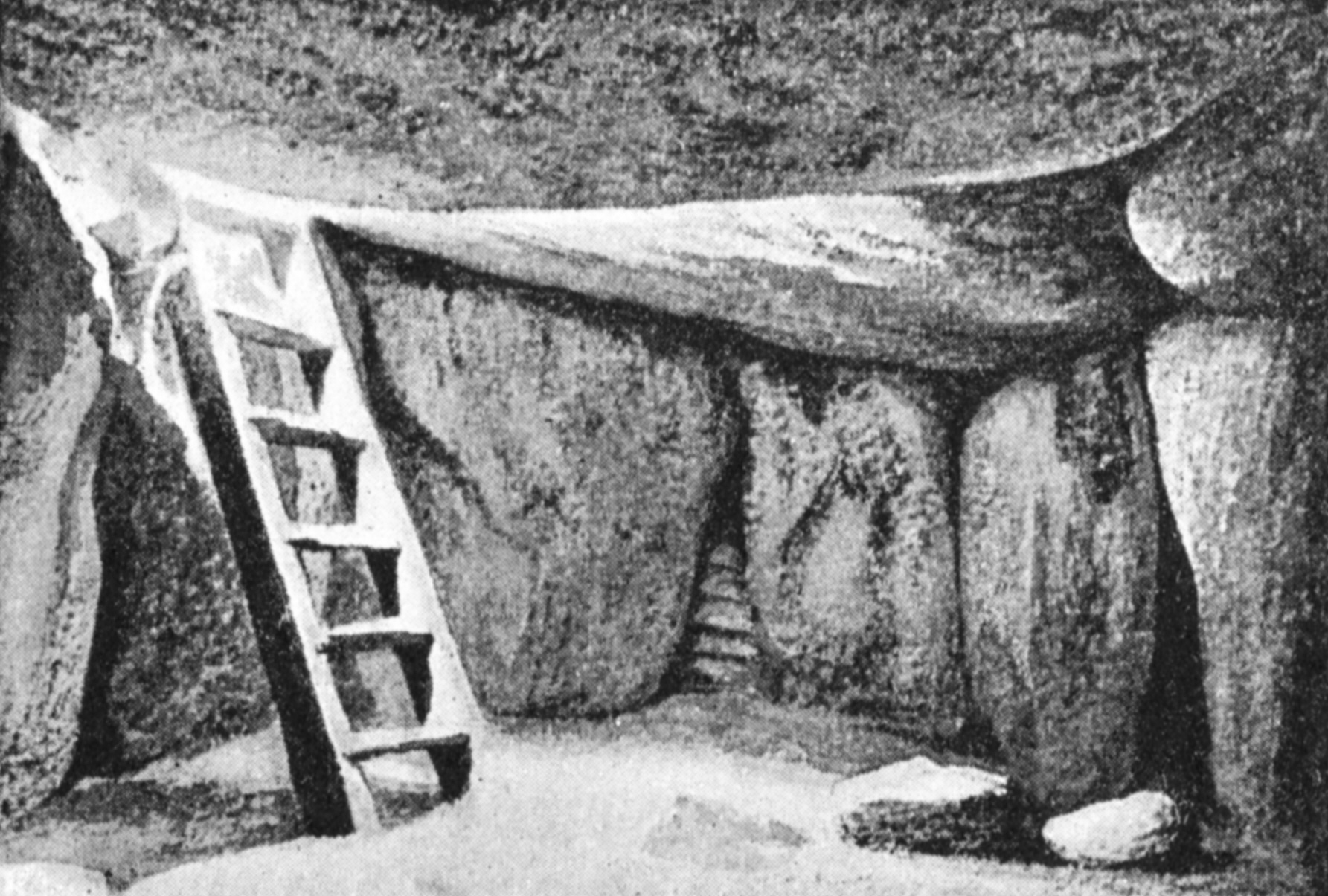
Denghoog passage grave interior

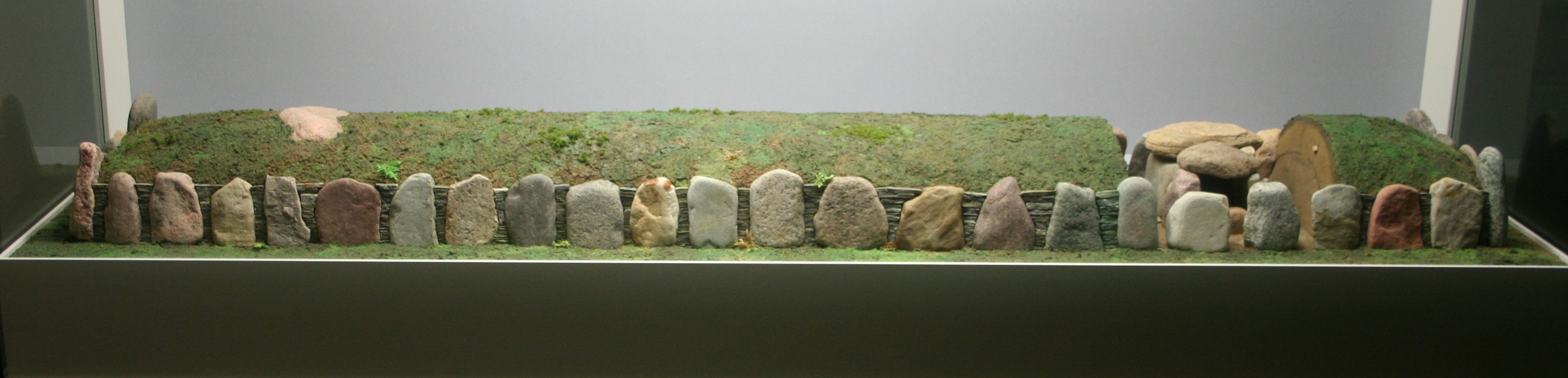
Long barrow grave model

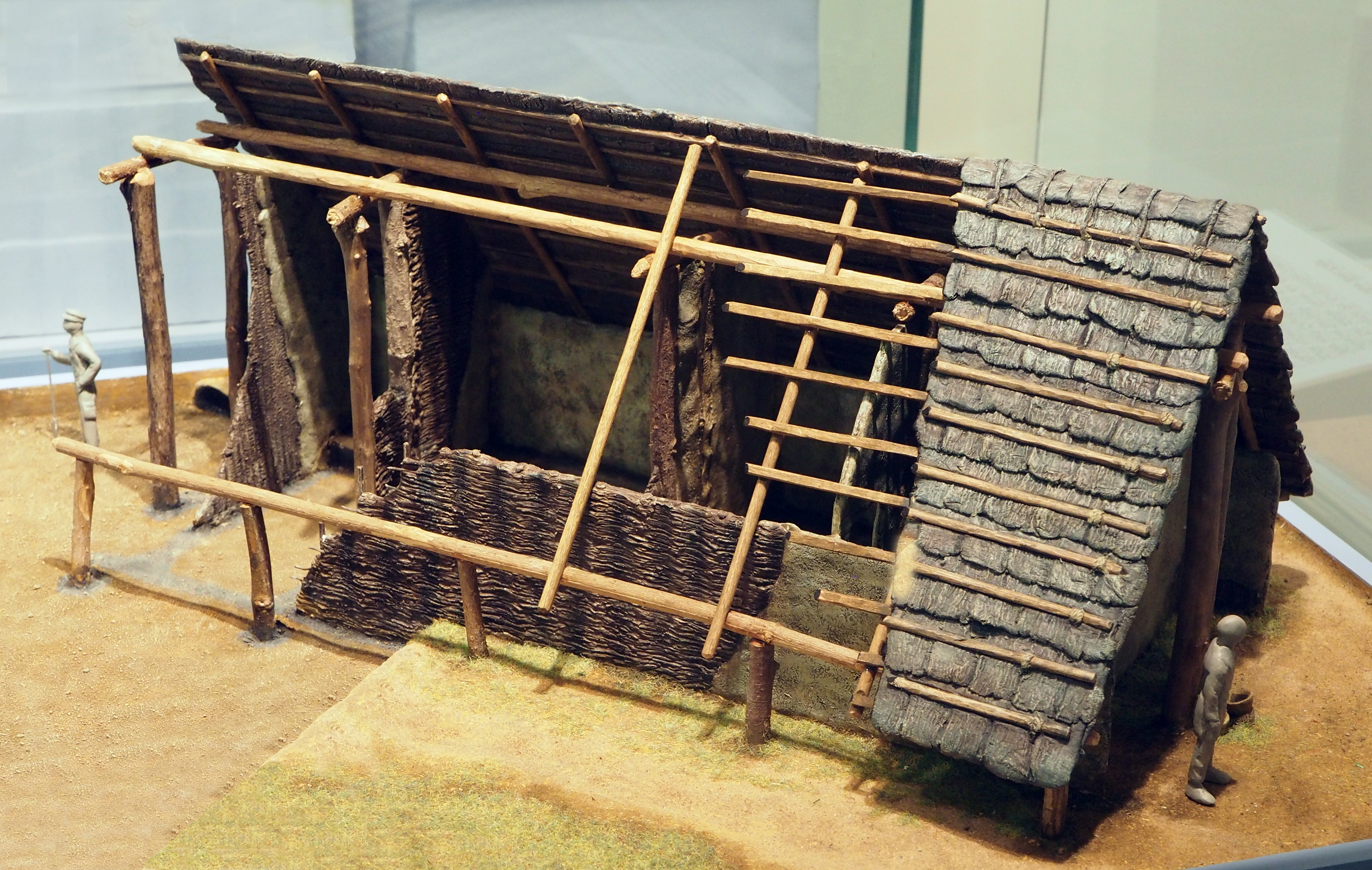
Model of a Funnelbeaker culture house, Germany. Bomann-Museum

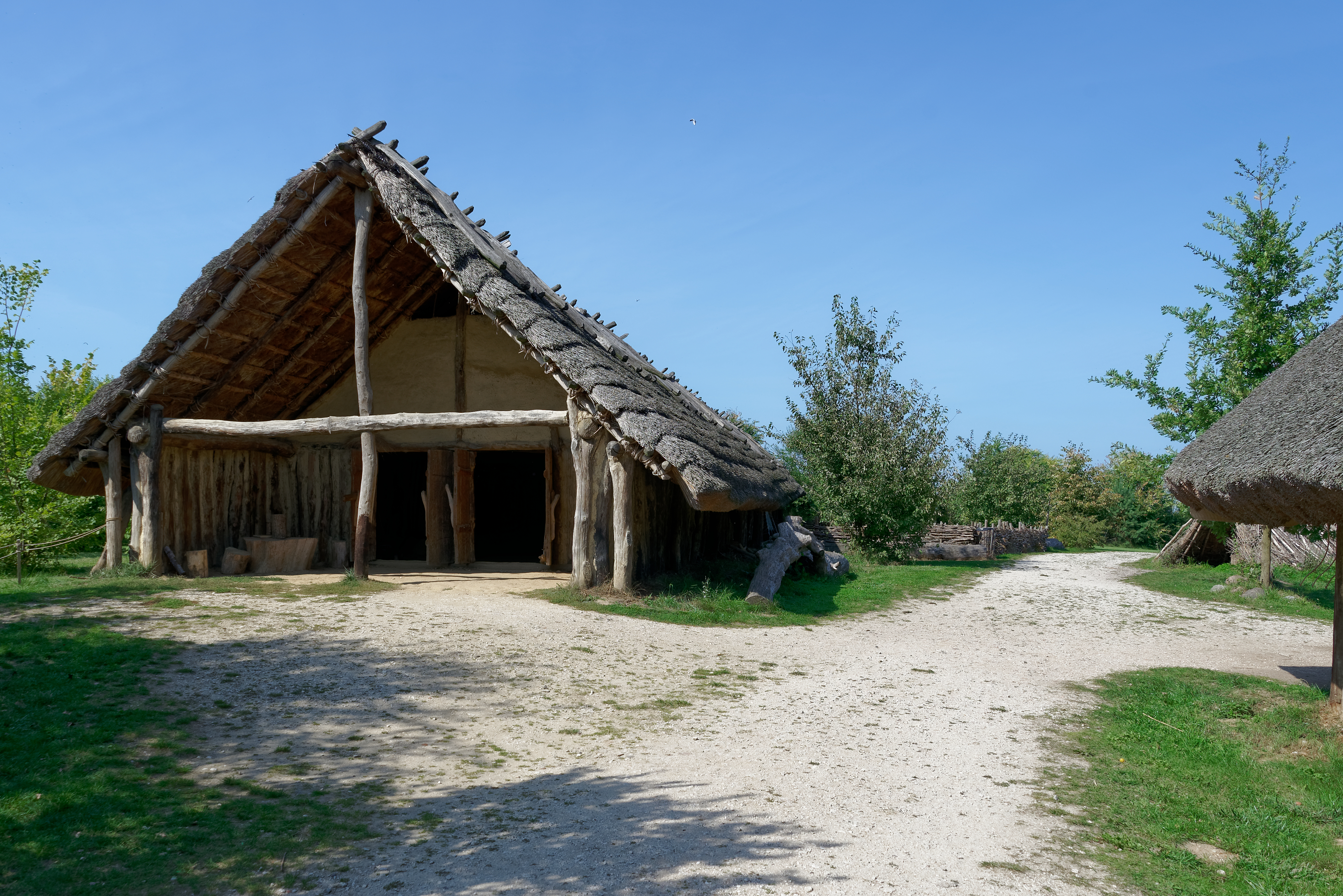
House reconstruction, Poland

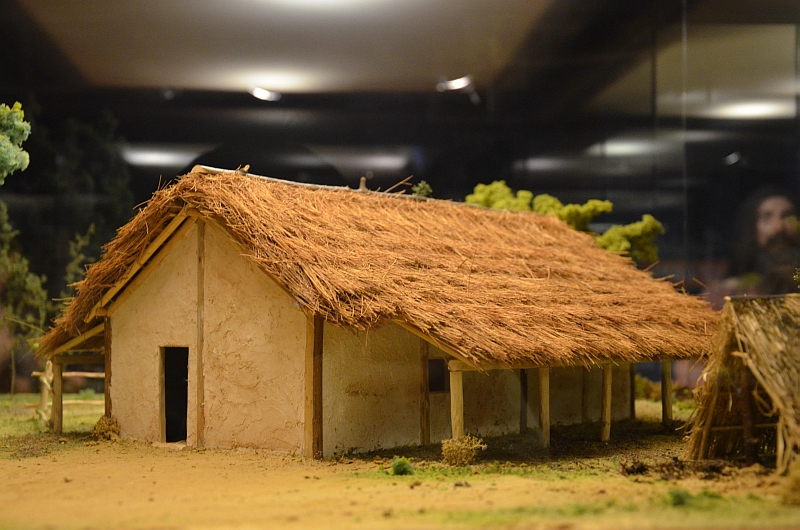
Model of a house in Poland, c. 3500 BCE

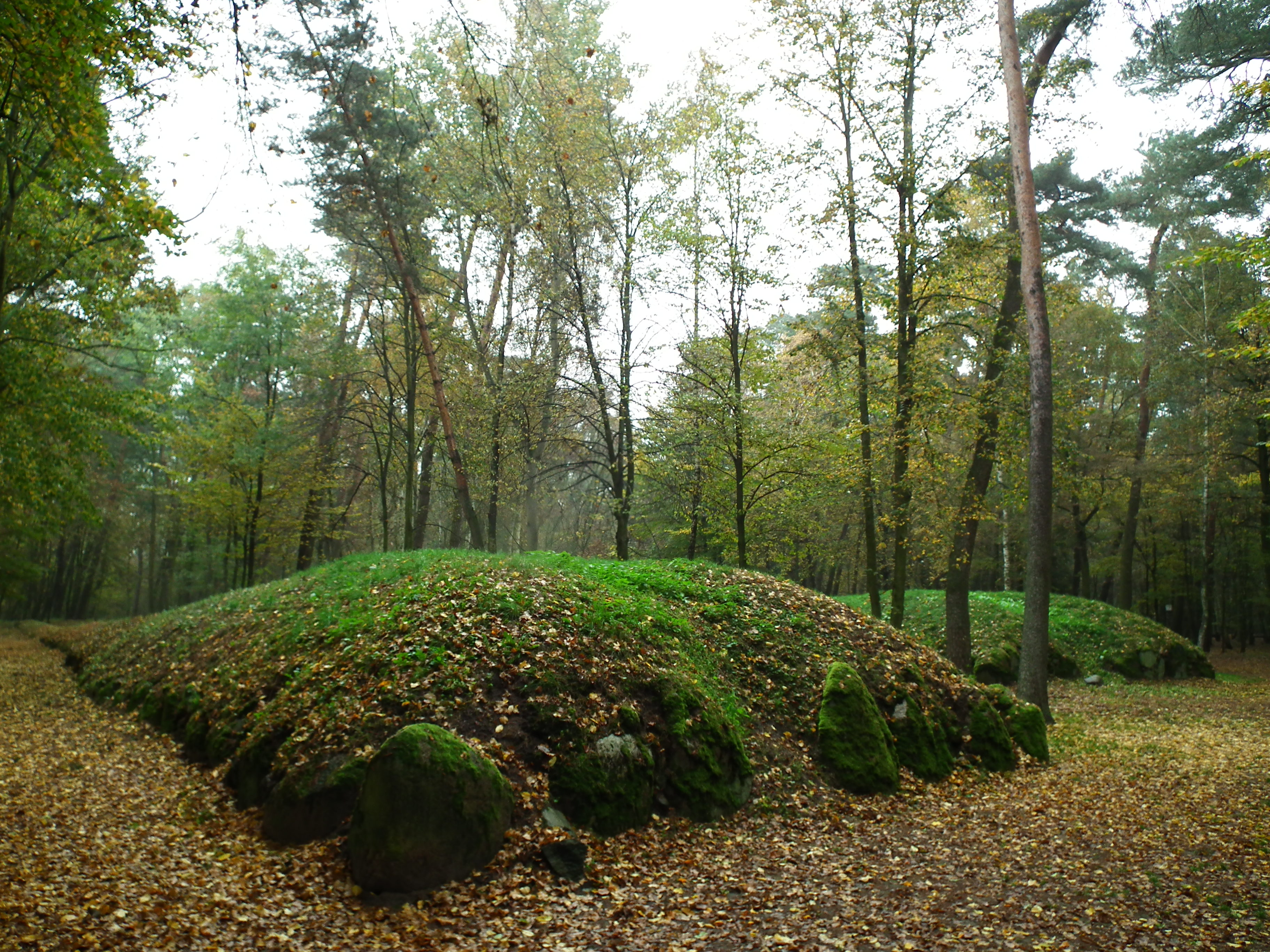
Kuyavian long barrows in Wietrzychowice, Poland

== Genetics ==
Ancient DNA analysis has found the people who produced the Funnelbeaker culture to be genetically different from earlier hunter-gather inhabitants of the region, and are instead closely related to other European Neolithic farmers, who ultimately traced most of their ancestry from early farmers in Anatolia, with some admixture from European hunter-gatherer groups. Genetic analysis suggests that there was some minor gene flow between the producers of the Funnelbeaker culture and those of the hunter-gatherer Pitted Ware culture (which descended from earlier Scandinavian hunter-gather groups) to the north.

A total of 62 males from sites attributed to the Funnelbeaker culture in Scandinavia and Germany have been sequenced for ancient DNA. Most belonged to haplogroup I2 while a smaller number belonged to R1b-V88, Q-FTF30 and G2a. MtDNA haplogroups included U, H, T, R and K.

== See also ==
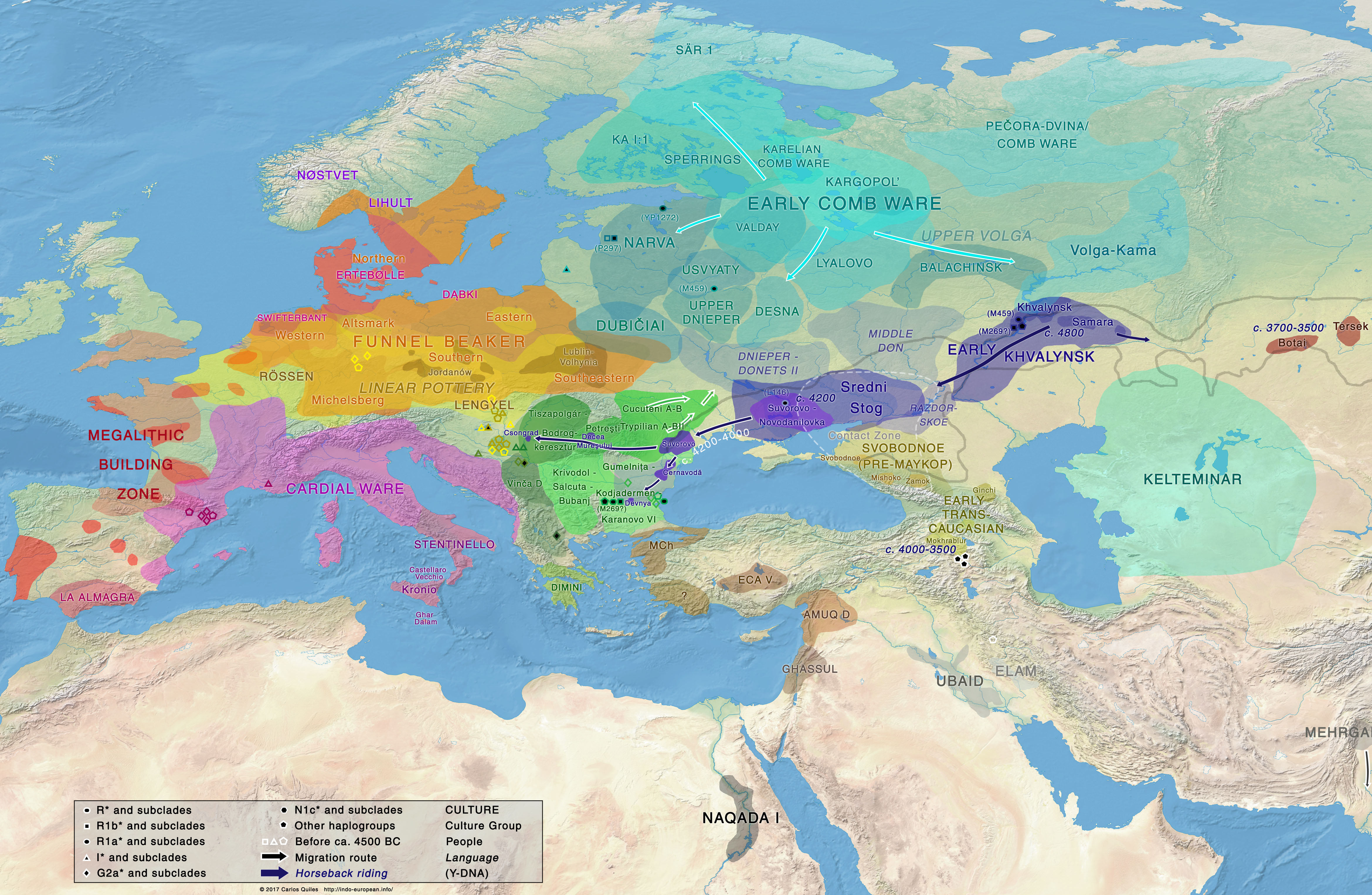
Diachronic map of Neolithic migrations c. 5000–4000 BCE

- Mondsee group
- Linear Pottery culture
- Salzmünde group
- Walternienburg-Bernburg culture
- Schönfeld culture
- Pit–Comb Ware culture
- Cardium Pottery culture
- Vlaardingen culture
- Prehistory and protohistory of Poland
- Stone Age Poland § Neolithic
- Scandinavian prehistory
- Prehistoric Germany
- Prehistoric Europe
- Old Europe
- Neolithic Europe
- Invention of the wheel

== Sources ==
- Alt, Kurt W.; et al. (February 7, 2020). "A massacre of early Neolithic farmers in the high Pyrenees at Els Trocs, Spain". Scientific Reports. 10 (2131). Nature Research: 2131. Bibcode:2020NatSR..10.2131A. doi:10.1038/s41598-020-58483-9. PMC 7005801. PMID 32034181.
- Beau, Alice; et al. (July 5, 2017). "Multi-scale ancient DNA analyses confirm the western origin of Michelsberg farmers and document probable practices of human sacrifice". PLOS One. 12 (7) e0179742. PLOS. Bibcode:2017PLoSO..1279742B. doi:10.1371/journal.pone.0179742. PMC 5497962. PMID 28678860.
- Brandt, Guido; et al. (December 10, 2013). "Ancient DNA Reveals Key Stages in the Formation of Central European Mitochondrial Genetic Diversity". Science. 342 (6155). American Association for the Advancement of Science: 257–261. Bibcode:2013Sci...342..257B. doi:10.1126/science.1241844. PMC 4039305. PMID 24115443.
- J. P. Mallory, "TRB Culture", Encyclopedia of Indo-European Culture, Fitzroy Dearborn, 1997.
- Malmström, Helena; et al. (November 3, 2009). "Ancient DNA Reveals Lack of Continuity between Neolithic Hunter-Gatherers and Contemporary Scandinavians". Current Biology. 19 (20). Cell Press: 1758–62. Bibcode:2009CBio...19.1758M. doi:10.1016/j.cub.2009.09.017. PMID 19781941. S2CID 9487217.
- Malmström, Helena; et al. (January 19, 2015). "Ancient mitochondrial DNA from the northern fringe of the Neolithic farming expansion in Europe sheds light on the dispersion process". Proceedings of the Royal Society B. 370 (1660). Royal Society. doi:10.1098/rstb.2013.0373. PMC 4275881. PMID 25487325.
- Malmström, Helena; et al. (October 9, 2019). "The genomic ancestry of the Scandinavian Battle Axe Culture people and their relation to the broader Corded Ware horizon". Proceedings of the Royal Society B. 286 (1912) 20191528. Royal Society. doi:10.1098/rspb.2019.1528. PMC 6790770. PMID 31594508.
- Malmström, Helena; et al. (June 4, 2020). "The Neolithic Pitted Ware culture foragers were culturally but not genetically influenced by the Battle Axe culture herders". American Journal of Physical Anthropology. 172 (4). American Association of Physical Anthropologists: 638–649. Bibcode:2020AJPA..172..638C. doi:10.1002/ajpa.24079. PMID 32497286.
- Haak, Wolfgang; et al. (March 2, 2015). "Massive migration from the steppe was a source for Indo-European languages in Europe". Nature. 522 (7555). Nature Research: 207–211. arXiv:1502.02783. Bibcode:2015Natur.522..207H. doi:10.1038/nature14317. PMC 5048219. PMID 25731166.
- Mathieson, Iain; et al. (February 21, 2018). "The genomic history of southeastern Europe". Nature. 555 (7695). Nature Research: 197–203. Bibcode:2018Natur.555..197M. doi:10.1038/nature25778. PMC 6091220. PMID 29466330.
- Mittnik, Alissa; et al. (January 30, 2018). "The genetic prehistory of the Baltic Sea region". Nature Communications. 9 (442). Nature Research: 442. Bibcode:2018NatCo...9..442M. doi:10.1038/s41467-018-02825-9. PMC 5789860. PMID 29382937.
- Lipson, Mark; et al. (November 8, 2017). "Parallel palaeogenomic transects reveal complex genetic history of early European farmers". Nature. 551 (7680). Nature Research: 368–372. Bibcode:2017Natur.551..368L. doi:10.1038/nature24476. PMC 5973800. PMID 29144465.
- Narasimhan, Vagheesh M.; et al. (September 6, 2019). "The formation of human populations in South and Central Asia". Science. 365 (6457). American Association for the Advancement of Science: 1230–1234. doi:10.1126/science.aat7487. PMC 6822619. PMID 31488661.
- Joachim Preuß. 1996. Das Neolithikum in Mitteleuropa, Kulturen - Wirtschaft
- Price, T. Douglas (2015). Ancient Scandinavia: An Archaeological History from the First Humans to the Vikings. Oxford University Press. ISBN 978-0-19-023197-2.
- Müller, Johannes (2011), Megaliths and Funnel Beakers: Societies in Change 4100–2700 BC, Drieendertigste Kroon-Voordracht, Amsterdam
- Nationalencyklopedin
- Sánchez-Quinto, Federico; et al. (May 7, 2019). "Megalithic tombs in western and northern Neolithic Europe were linked to a kindred society". Proceedings of the National Academy of Sciences of the United States of America. 116 (19). National Academy of Sciences: 9469–9474. Bibcode:2019PNAS..116.9469S. doi:10.1073/pnas.1818037116. PMC 6511028. PMID 30988179.
- Shennan, Stephen (2018). The First Farmers of Europe: An Evolutionary Perspective. Cambridge World Archaeology. Cambridge University Press. doi:10.1017/9781108386029. ISBN 978-1-108-42292-5.
- Skoglund, Pontus; et al. (April 27, 2012). "Origins and Genetic Legacy of Neolithic Farmers and Hunter-Gatherers in Europe". Science. 336 (6080). American Association for the Advancement of Science: 466–469. Bibcode:2012Sci...336..466S. doi:10.1126/science.1216304. PMID 22539720. S2CID 13371609.
- Skoglund, Pontus; et al. (May 16, 2014). "Genomic Diversity and Admixture Differs for Stone-Age Scandinavian Foragers and Farmers". Science. 344 (6185). American Association for the Advancement of Science: 747–750. Bibcode:2014Sci...344..747S. doi:10.1126/science.1253448. PMID 24762536. S2CID 206556994.
- Stolarek, I.; et al. (May 1, 2019). "Goth migration induced changes in the matrilineal genetic structure of the central-east European population". Nature Communications. 9 (6737). Nature Research: 6737. Bibcode:2019NatSR...9.6737S. doi:10.1038/s41598-019-43183-w. PMC 6494872. PMID 31043639.
- Wade, Nicholas, "The Twists and Turns of History, and DNA", The New York Times March 12, 2006.
- Pedersen, Hilthart, "Die jüngere Steinzeit auf Bornholm", München & Ravensburg 2008.
