= Likava Castle =

Historic site in Slovakia

Coordinates: 49°6′19″N 19°18′43″E

- Likavský Hrad
- Likavka, Žilina Region, Slovakia
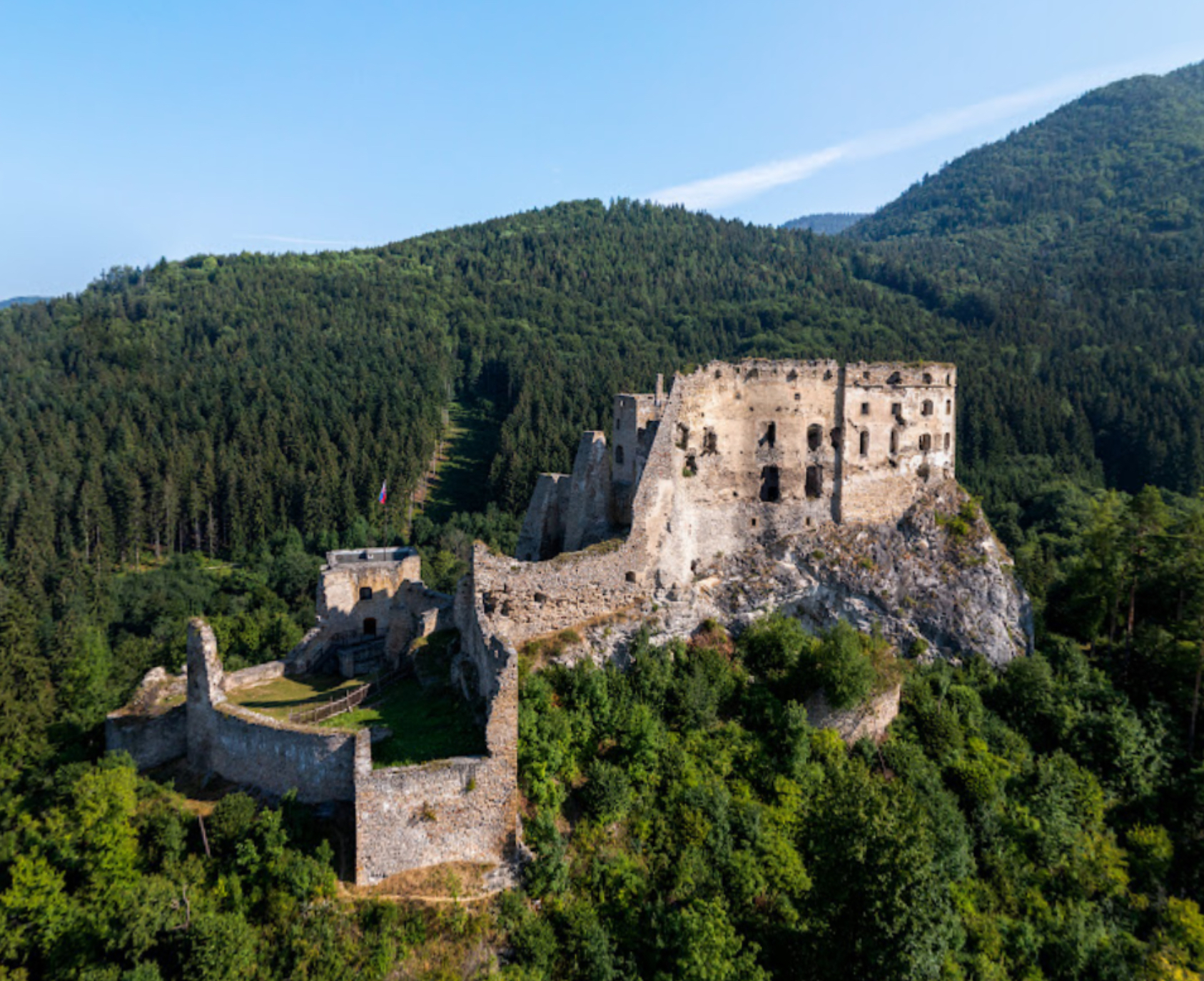
- Aerial photo of the castle

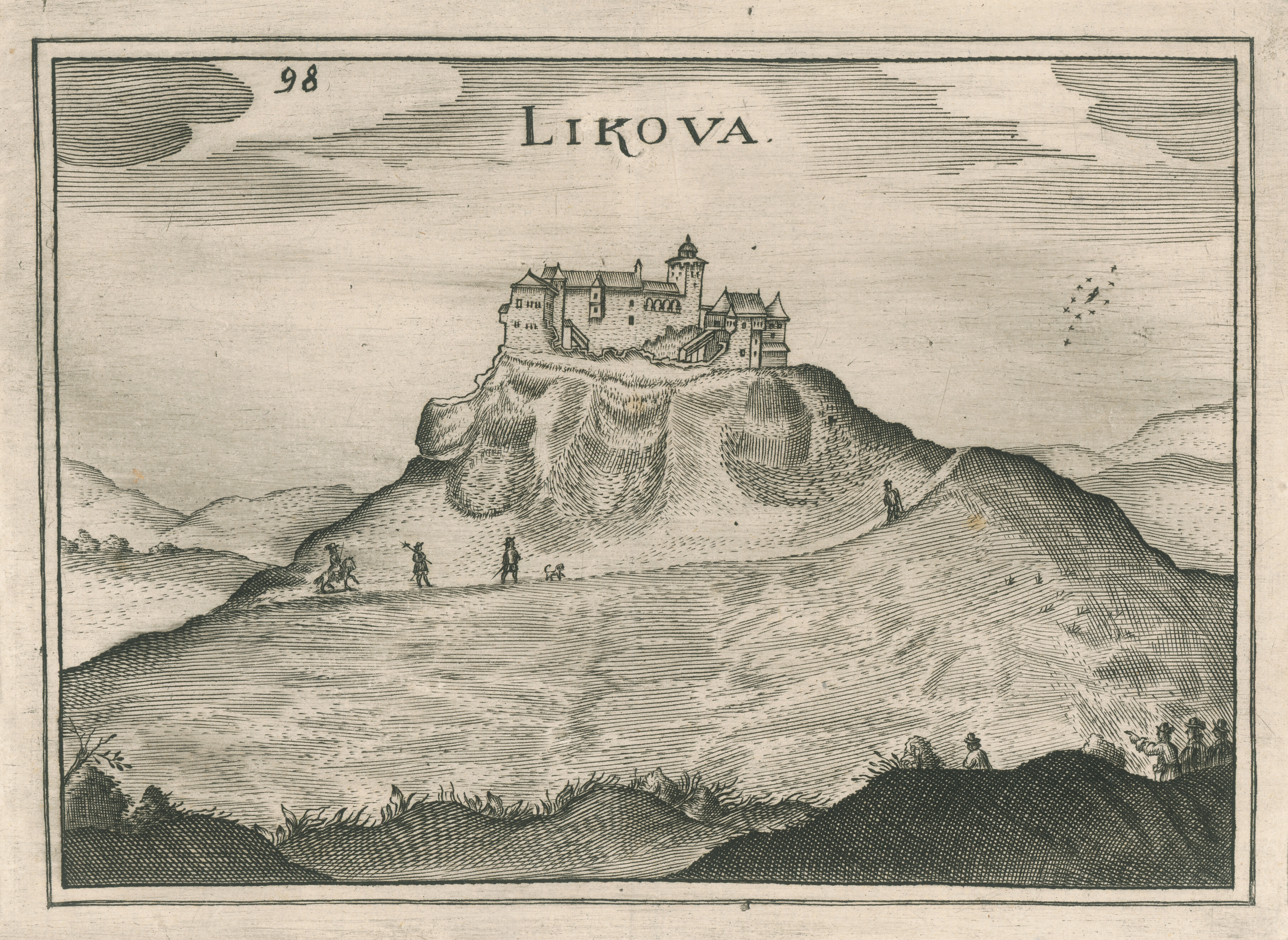
- An illustration of what the castle might have looked like

Site information
- Type: Castle
- Controlled by: Cultural Heritage Monuments of Slovakia
- Open to the public: yes
- Condition: Partly a permanent ruin, partly rebuilt

Site history
- Built: Around 1315
- Materials: Stonemasonry
- Demolished: 1707

Likava Castle (Slovak: Likavský hrad) is a castle in the village of Likavka which is a part of the Ružomberok District in Slovakia. It is mostly in ruins.

Likava Castle is located in the north-western region of Liptov. The Castle was first mentioned in 1315. Its construction started with the purpose of establishing a defensive point overseeing the crossing of the river Váh and the trade route extending from the Váh Basin to Orava and onward to Poland.

The Hunyady family, who owned the Castle, progressively expanded and renovated the main structure, adding what is known as the lower Castle during the latter half of the 15th century. By the second half of the 17th century, the Thökölys completed the entire fortification system; however, it proved ineffective as it failed to prevent the catastrophe at the start of the 18th century, when the retreating forces of Francis Rákoczi completely pulled down the Castle in 1707.

== History ==
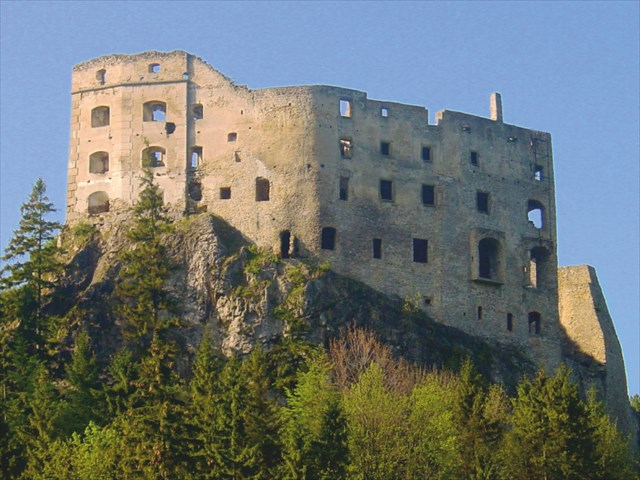
Likava Castle from the other side.

The castle, situated on the route from Liptov to Orava, was likely constructed by Master Doncs around the year 1335. Following his demise, the castle came under the ownership of the royal chamber, and in 1397, it was involved in the campaign led by the Moravian margrave Prokop and the Opole prince Ladislav, during which the castle was captured and briefly held. Between 1410 and 1415, a royal construction smelter operated within the castle, resulting in numerous modifications to its structure. In the 1420s, the castle was under the stewardship of castellan John of Messenpek, whose subsequent contributions are well-documented in Moravia. When Queen Barbara of Cilli acquired Likava around 1430, it was seized by the Hussites, who only vacated it in 1434.

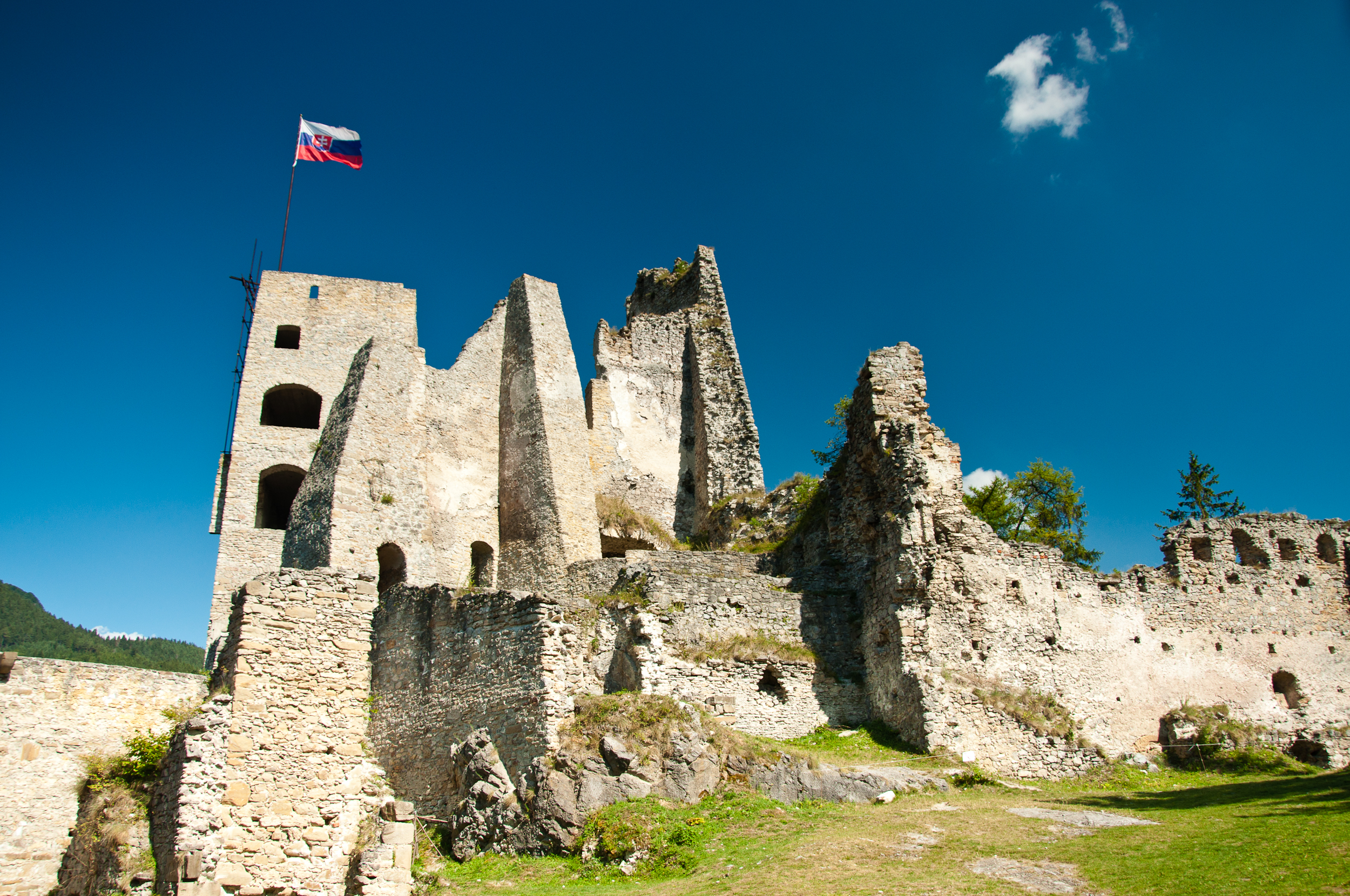
The castle upfront.

Subsequently, the castle came into the possession of John Hunyadi, who undertook its restoration and constructed a new western gate. The ownership later alternated between the Pongrácz family from St. Nicholas and Peter Komorovský. In 1474, Matthias Corvinus reclaimed the estate from Komorovský, and upon his death, it passed to his illegitimate son John. In 1496, Stephen Zápolya forcibly took control of the castle, but during a conflict between his son John and Ferdinand I of Habsburg regarding the Hungarian throne, Likava was captured in 1528 by Imperial General Katzianer. Lajos Pekry received the damaged castle and, based on the coat of arms inscriptions from 1533 to 1535, he restored and renovated it.

In the mid-16th century, the Báthory family already owned the castle, and in 1566, Duke John Krušič of Lupoglava purchased it. He focused on enhancing the fortifications in response to the Turkish threat. Additionally, he sacrificed living quarters and a chapel on the castle's eastern front, which he significantly reinforced and equipped with cannon chambers, effectively transforming it into a polygonal cannon bastion. Stephen Illésházy later united the Likava estate with his widow Katalin Pálffy, who likely completed the reconstruction. Under Gáspár Illésházy's direction, the first eastern gate was constructed in 1642, but by the mid-17th century, the castle came into the possession of the Thököly princely family.

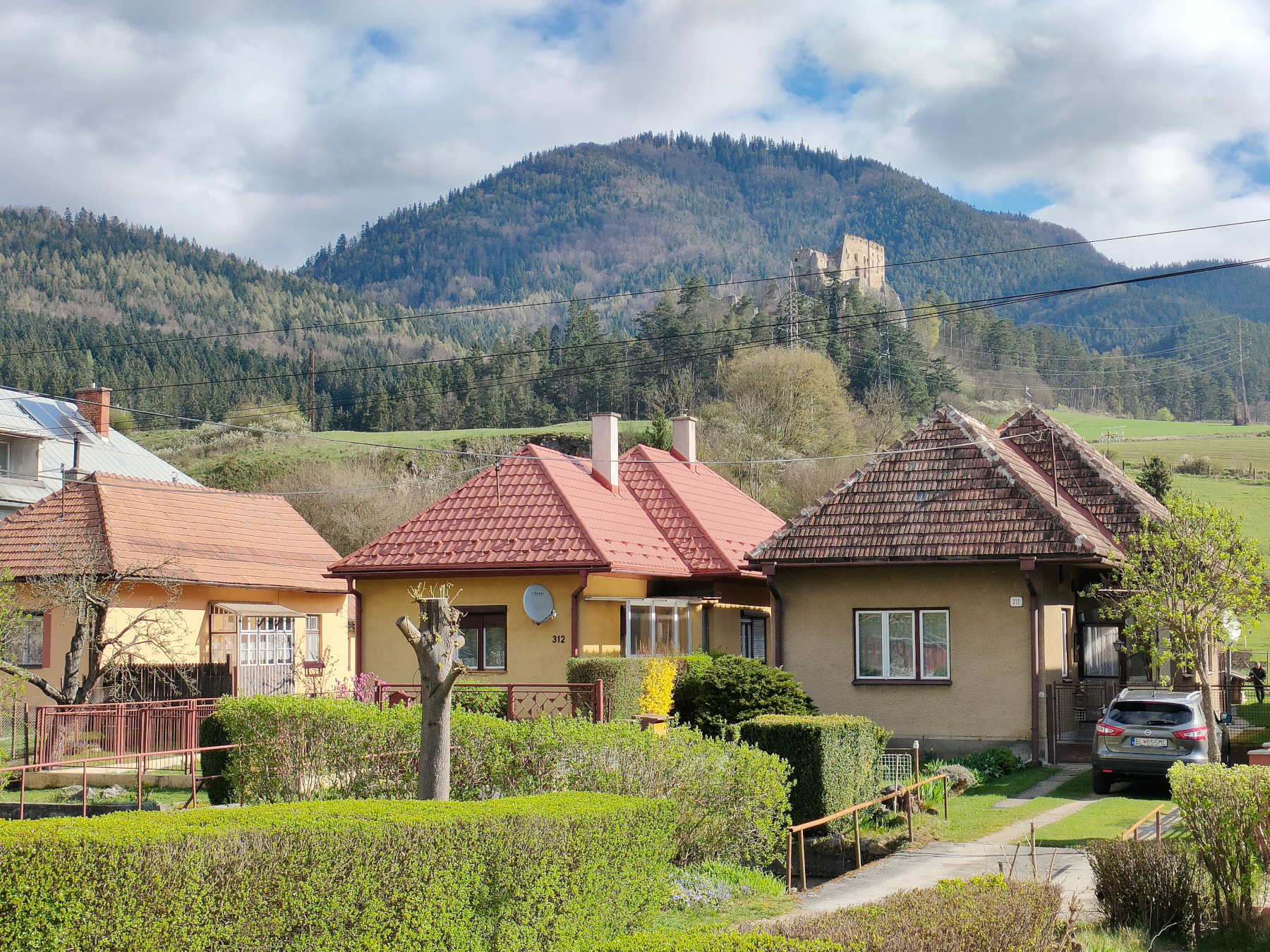
The village of Likavka.

Stephen Thököly ultimately provided the castle with a water source, a well, at a considerable cost. Furthermore, the palaces and their facades underwent adjustments, including height modifications. Starting in 1651, Stephen constructed a massive western fortification, which is now nearly obscured by forest. The three round bastions (reportedly five originally) were linked by a wall that ran along the edge of the terrain terrace, in front of which a moat was partially dug. However, this fortification did not prevent the castle's capture by the imperial army in 1670, when General Heister took control after a week-long siege. The castle experienced re-occupation by Thököly rebel forces and imperial troops in 1678, leading to its conversion into a penitentiary. Following the uprising, the treasury of Francis II. Rákóczi decided in 1707 to demolish the castle, resulting in its gradual deterioration thereafter.

In 2025, parts of the castle were reconstructed.

== Architecture ==
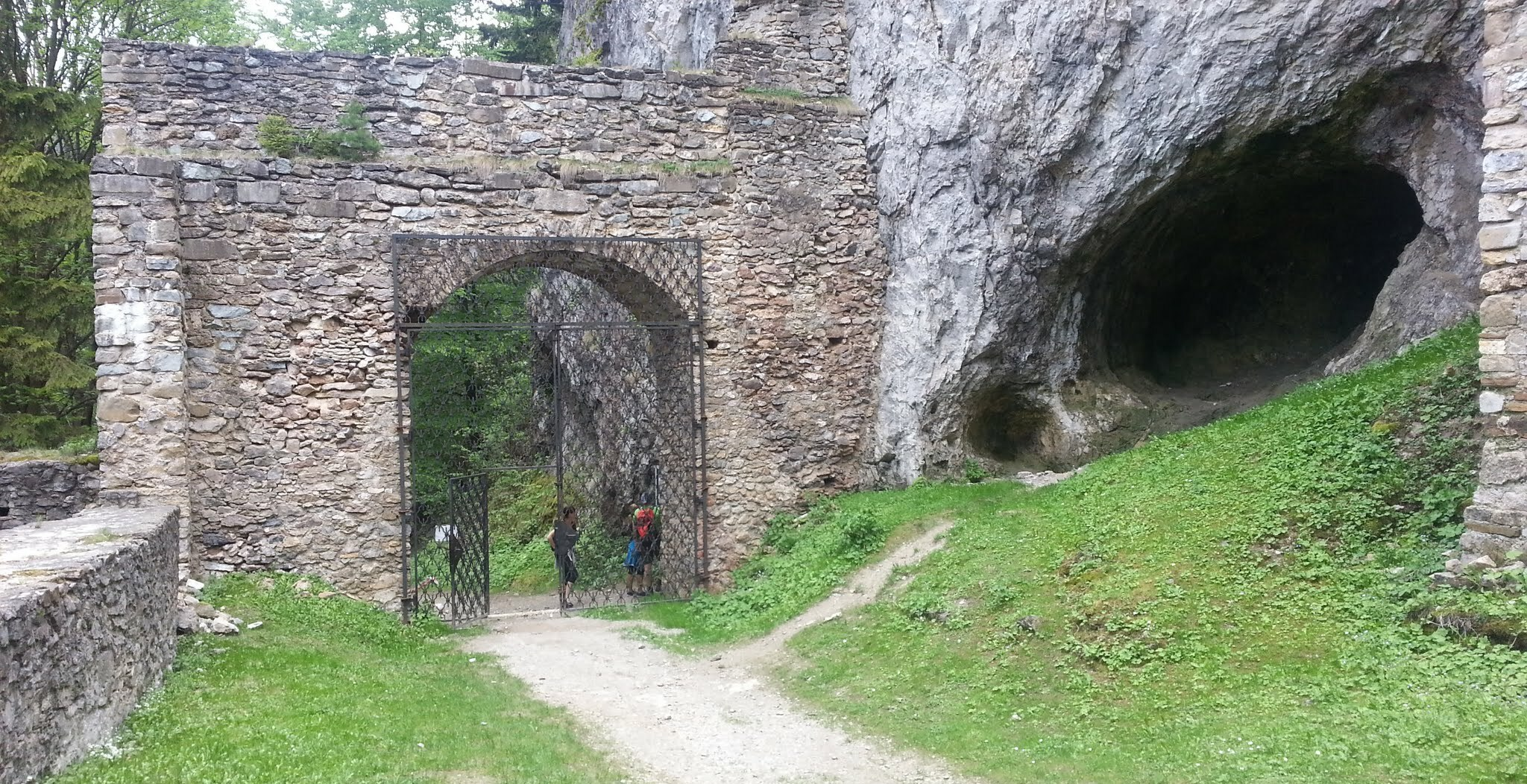
Gates to the castle.

At the pinnacle of the castle hill stands an upper castle that showcases Renaissance Gothic architecture. Nestled among the remnants of the palaces is a quaint courtyard. From an archaeological perspective, the most significant features include the preserved Gothic and Renaissance architectural elements, such as window frames, portals, consoles, gunports, a Renaissance attic, and sloped roofs designed to protect the castle's access road. The lower castle is characterized by its impressive fortifications, complete with an entrance and bastions. Recently, the castle underwent reconstruction and refurbishment, leaving behind evidence of various modifications.

== See also ==
- List of castles in Slovakia
