= Ciołek coat of arms =

Polish coat of arms

Ciołek
- Battle cry: Biała, Ciołek
- Alternative names: Biała, Taurus, Thaurus, Vitulus
- Earliest mention: 1279 (seal), 1401 (record)
- Cities: Trzcianka, Poniatowa
- Families: 185 names A Aksamitowski. B Bielański, Bielawski, Bieliński, Borkowski, Brzeski, Bzicki. C Cetys, Chabdziński, Chądzeński, Chądzyński, Chebdziński, Chędziński, Chodźko, Chudzewski, Cichoborski, Cielątko, Ciołek, Ciołkiewicz, Ciołkowicz, Ciszkiewicz, Czarnołoski, Czarnołuski, Czuszułowicz. D Dobroniecki, Dobrynicki, Dobryniecki, Dobryniewski, Dobrzyńiecki, Dobszewicz, Drzewicki, Drzewiecki, Dulewicz. E Ewil, Ewild, Eynild. F Fiebron, Fyebron. G Gałajski, Gawianowski, Gerłachowski, Gierlachowski, Gierłach, Gierłachowski, Głuski, Głuszewicz, Głuszkiewicz, Głuszkowicz, Gnoiński, Gnojeński, Gorczyczewski, Goryszewski, Gościejewski, Gościejowski, Górecki, Gułowski, Gumkowski, Gutanowski, Gutowski. H Hutowicz. J Jarogoszka, Jarosławski, Jasiewski, Jaszewski, Jazgarski, Jazgarzewski, Jazgorzewski, Jeżowski. K Kabat, Kajsza, Kaliski, Kalisz, Kędzierzawski, Klausgielowicz, Klawsgiełowicz, Kodziewicz, Komarowicz, Komarowski, Komorowski, Konarzewski, Kopowski, Korwecki, Korycki, Kossowski, Koszewski, Koszowski, Koszyłowicz, Kromolicki, Krzytowicz, Kuczyński. L Leżański, Leżeński, Leżyński, Lipowiec, Lipowiecki, Lipowski. M Maciejewski, Maciejowski, Malinowski, Mączewski, Michajłowicz, Mielecki, Milecki, Mielęcki, Milęcki, Modliszewski, Mordas, Mosiński, Muświc. N Nowosza. O Orzechowski, Osiemborowski, Ostrołęcki, Ostrowski, Oszczepalski. P Pawłowski, Pijanowski, Pilecki, Piotrowski, Podfilipski, Podrzecki, Podstolski, Poniatowski, Poświński, Powiełowski, Powsiński, Powsłowski, Poznański, Pożarzyński, Pusłowski. R Rachowski, Regulski, Rodewicz, Rogewicz, Roszczewski, Roszewski, Rożniszewski, Rusiński. S Sablicki, Sadurski, Siekierka, Siekierko, Snarski, Sobieński, Sobol, Starski, Szablicki, Szadurski. Ś Świderski, Świrski. T Tarnowski, Tetewczyński. W Wigand, Winkszna, Winkszno, Wiszniowski, Wiśniewski, Witelius, Włost, Włostowski, Wolczyński, Wołczyński, Woźnicki, Wrzescz, Wrzeszcz, Wrzeszczowski, Wyleziński. Z Zabowicz, Zakrzewski, Zaleski, Zalęcki, Załęcki, Zardecki, Zelechowski, Zielechowski, Zielichowski, Żeleński, Zozulski, Zuliński. Ż Żardecki, Żelechowski, Żeleński, Żelichowski, Żeliński, Żuliński, Żyliński.

Ciołek (Polish for "bull calf") is a Polish coat of arms, one of the oldest in medieval Poland. It was used by many szlachta (noble) families under the late Piast dynasty, under the Polish–Lithuanian Commonwealth, during the Partitions of Poland, and in the 20th century. The variant names "Siolek" and "Cialek" arose from miscommunication among early-20th-century Polish immigrants to the United States.

== History ==
A history of this coat-of-arms is included in a Short History of Polish Arms written by Countess Ewa Theresa Korab-Karpinska in the late 1980s, which is currently lodged at the College of Arms in London. As heraldic heiress and only daughter of Tadeusz Josef Żeleński (also spelled Zielinski/Zelinski), Ewa was one of a handful of women to write upon the subject of heraldry. The bull and crown were later exceptionally incorporated as a crest into an English Grant of Arms by the English College of Arms.

== Notable bearers ==
Notable bearers of this coat of arms have included:

- Gerard Ciołek
- Poniatowski family
  - Andrzej Poniatowski
  - Izabella Poniatowska
  - Józef Antoni Poniatowski
  - Michał Jerzy Poniatowski
  - Stanisław Poniatowski (1676–1762)
  - Stanisław Poniatowski (1754–1833)
  - Stanisław August Poniatowski, last King of Poland
- Zbigniew J. Lipowski (1925–1997)
- Tadeusz Boy-Żeleński
- Żeleński family
  - Count Tadeusz Josef Żeleński
  - Countess Ewa Theresa Żeleńska Korab-Karpinska
  - Countess Sarah Elżbieta Philimina Korab-Karpinska Żeleńska Eagan

== Gallery ==
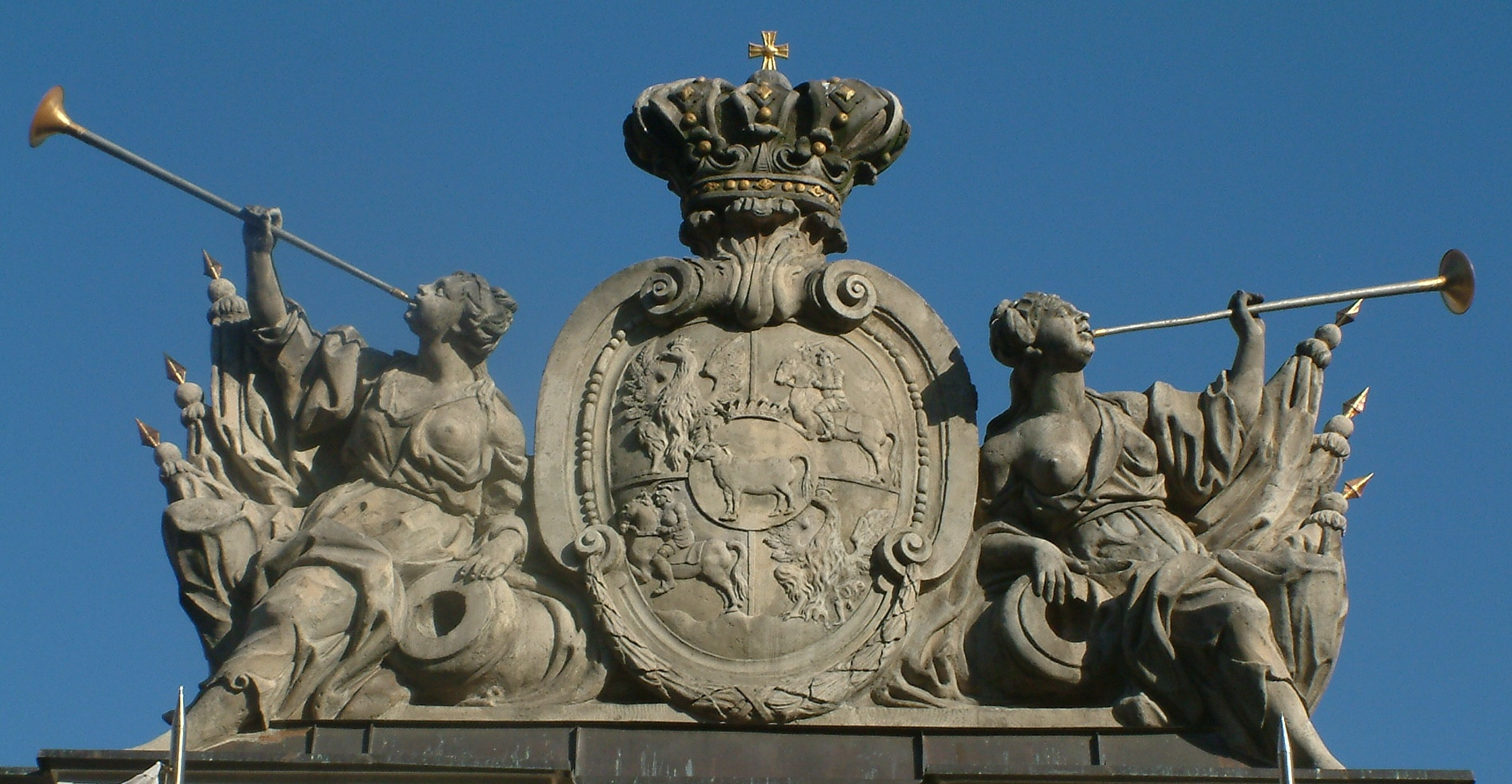
Ciołek coat of arms as presented in the Polish–Lithuanian Commonwealth coat of arms. Ciołek coat of arms was borne by Stanislaus II August, the king of Poland. The sculpture is situated on Guardhouse in Poznań.

Coat of arms of Stanislaus Augustus Poniatowski as the King of Poland

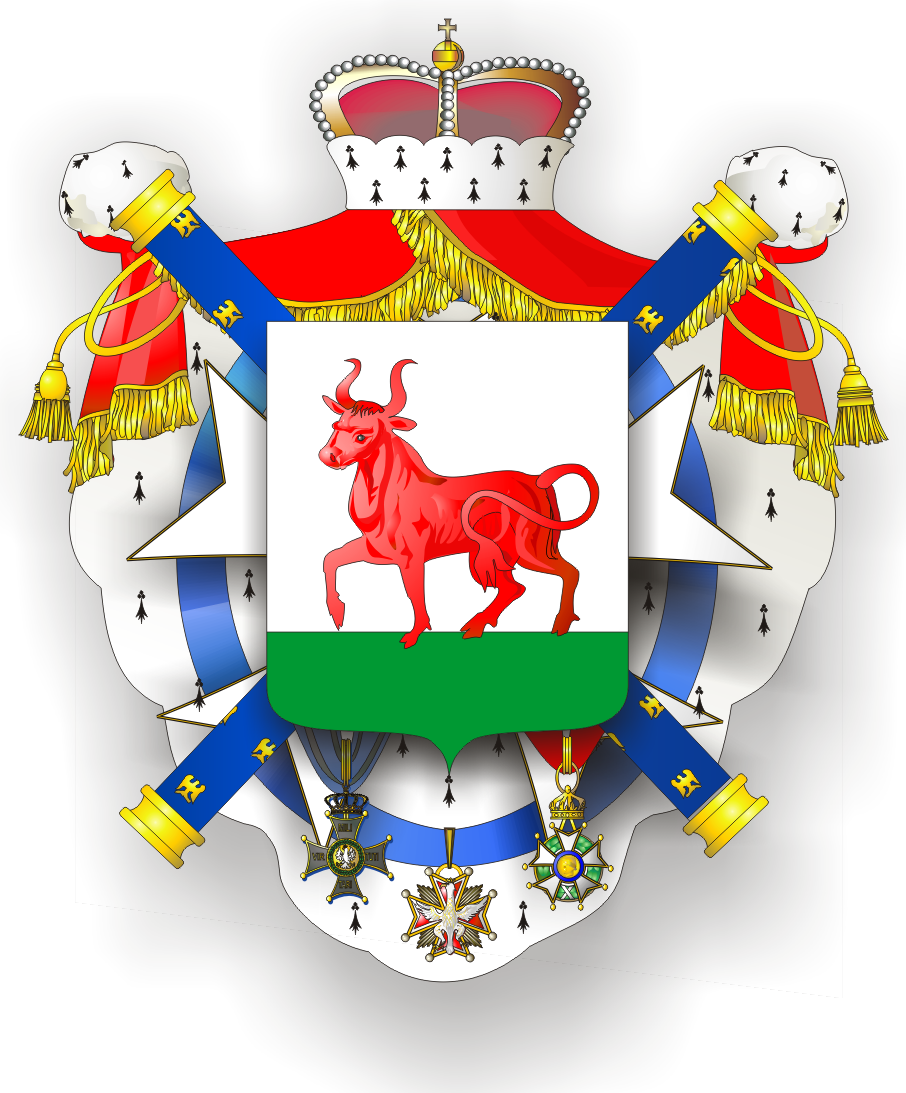
Coat of arms of Prince Józef Poniatowski, Marshal of France, with Order of the White Eagle, Virtuti Militari and Légion d'honneur

Coat of arms of Counts Komorowski

Ciołek II (odm)

Ciołek (Sobol) (odm)

Stefan (odm)

== See also ==
- Polish heraldry
- Heraldic family
- List of Polish nobility coats of arms
- Taurus Poniatovii

== Bibliography ==
- Alfred Znamierowski: Herbarz rodowy. Warszawa: Świat Książki, 2004, s. 96. ISBN 83-7391-166-9.
- Tadeusz Gajl, 2003. Polskie rody szlacheckie i ich herby. Białystok: Dom Wydawniczy Benkowski.
- Tadeusz Gajl: Herbarz polski od średniowiecza do XX wieku : ponad 4500 herbów szlacheckich 37 tysięcy nazwisk 55 tysięcy rodów. L&L, 2007, s. 406-539. ISBN 978-83-60597-10-1.
- Jardetzky, Oleg. 1992. The Ciolek of Poland. Graz, Austria: Akademische Druck-u. Verlagsanstalt. ISBN 3-201-01583-0 (A detailed book summarizing available documents from Polish, German, Russian and French archives. It deals with the Ciołek clan genealogy during the period c. 800 – c. 1450 AD, 244 pages)
- Sławomir Górzyński: Arystokracja polska w Galicji: studium heraldyczno-genealogiczne. Warszawa: DiG, 2009, s. 195-196. ISBN 978-83-7181-597-3.
- Józef Szymański: Herbarz rycerstwa polskiego z XVI wieku. Warszawa: DiG, 2001, s. 41. ISBN 83-7181-217-5.
