= Gutowsky =

Gutowsky is a surname. Notable people with the surname include:

- Ace Gutowsky (1909–1976), American football fullback
- Herbert S. Gutowsky (1919–2000), American chemist and professor

== See also ==
- Gutowski
