= Janusz Stawarz =

Polish association football player

Personal information
- Full name: Janusz Wiesław Stawarz
- Date of birth: 1 December 1959 (age 66)
- Place of birth: Łętowice, Poland
- Height: 1.85 m (6 ft 1 in)
- Position: Goalkeeper

Youth career
- –1977: Unia Tarnów
- 1977–1979: Stal Mielec

Senior career*
Years	Team	Apps	(Gls)
1979–1984	Stal Mielec		(0)
1985–1990	Lechia Gdańsk	138	(0)
1990	Syrianska		

International career
- Poland U18
1981	Poland	2	(0)
Medal record
Men's football
Representing Poland
UEFA European Under-18 Championship
Third place	1978 Poland
- * Club domestic league appearances and goals

Janusz Wiesław Stawarz (born 1 December 1959) is a Polish former footballer who played as a goalkeeper. His playing career was spent with Stal Mielec and Lechia Gdańsk, making 188 appearances in Poland's top division, as well as featuring twice for the Poland national team.

== Biography ==
=== Club football ===
Born in Łętowice near Tarnów, he played in the youth sides for his local team Unia Tarnów. In 1977 he joined the biggest team in the region, Stal Mielec. During the 1978–79 season Stawarz made his first senior league appearances, playing twice in the league as Stal finished in an impressive third place in the I liga. The following season Stawarz found himself becoming the first choice keeper, and was the first choice keeper for the 1981–82 season when Stal once again finished in third place in the Polish championship, with Stawarz making 22 appearances in the process. After the initial success he enjoyed with Stal while at the club, their competitiveness started to wane, with the team being relegated the following season. The club did not again return to the I liga while Stawarz was at the club, with Stawarz deciding to leave Stal midway through the 1984–85 season. In total he made 93 top flight appearances with Stal Mielec.

Stawarz joined Lechia Gdańsk in January 1985, making his debut for the club on 10 March 1985 against Górnik Wałbrzych. Stawarz went on to become the first choice goalkeeper at Lechia over the following 3 seasons in the I liga, but was unable to help the team suffering relegation to the II liga in 1988. He spent two more seasons with Lechia in the second tier before leaving the club at the end of the 1989–90 season. In total Stawarz made 95 appearances for Lechia in the I liga, and 152 appearances in all competitions. He played 6 months in Sweden with Syrianska before retiring from professional football at the end of 1990.

=== International football ===
Stawarz played in many of the Polish international youth teams. He played for Poland as they won the bronze medal in the 1978 UEFA European U18 Championships. In 1979 he played in the FIFA World Youth Championships in Japan for the Poland U20's, playing against the likes of Diego Maradona in the group stages. Poland would go on to finish 4th in the championships, losing in the 3rd place play-off to Uruguay.

In 1981 the Poland senior went on a tour to Japan, playing a total of four matches in the process. Stawarz was included in the squad for the tour and made his Poland debut on 27 January 1981, playing the full 90 minutes as Poland beat Japan 4–2. 4 days later he came on as a sub in his second, and what would be final cap for Poland, as they beat Japan 4–1.

=== Coaching career ===
After his playing career Stawarz initially worked as a sales representative for a company called "Jurajska". After 7 years he went into coaching goalkeepers, coaching at teams such as Stal Mielec, the Podkarpackie Voivodeship "national" team, Poland U17's and U20's, GKS Katowice, and Cracovia.

== Honours ==
Poland U18

- UEFA European Under-18 Championship third place: 1978
