= Wierzchosławice =

Wierzchosławice may refer to the following places in Poland:

- Wierzchosławice, Lower Silesian Voivodeship (south-west Poland)
- Wierzchosławice, Lesser Poland Voivodeship (south Poland)
