= Komorów =

Komorów may refer to the following places in Poland:

- Komorów, Pruszków County in Masovian Voivodeship (east-central Poland)
- Komorów, Oleśnica County in Lower Silesian Voivodeship (south-west Poland)
- Komorów, Świdnica County in Lower Silesian Voivodeship (south-west Poland)
- Komorów, Rawa County in Łódź Voivodeship (central Poland)
- Komorów, Gmina Tomaszów Mazowiecki in Łódź Voivodeship (central Poland)
- Komorów, Miechów County in Lesser Poland Voivodeship (south Poland)
- Komorów, Tarnów County in Lesser Poland Voivodeship (south Poland)
- Komorów, Busko County in Świętokrzyskie Voivodeship (south-central Poland)
- Komorów, Subcarpathian Voivodeship (south-east Poland)
- Komorów, Końskie County in Świętokrzyskie Voivodeship (south-central Poland)
- Komorów, Przysucha County in Masovian Voivodeship (east-central Poland)
- Komorów, Warsaw West County in Masovian Voivodeship (east-central Poland)
- Komorów, Greater Poland Voivodeship (west-central Poland)
- Komorów, Lubusz Voivodeship (west Poland)

== See also ==
- Gmina Komarów-Osada, Zamość County, Lublin Voivodeship, in eastern Poland
- Komorowo (disambiguation)
