= Mikołajowice =

Mikołajowice may refer to the following places in Poland:

- Mikołajowice, Lower Silesian Voivodeship (south-west Poland)
- Mikołajowice, Lesser Poland Voivodeship (south Poland)
