= Bogumiłowice, Lesser Poland Voivodeship =

Bogumiłowice
- Village
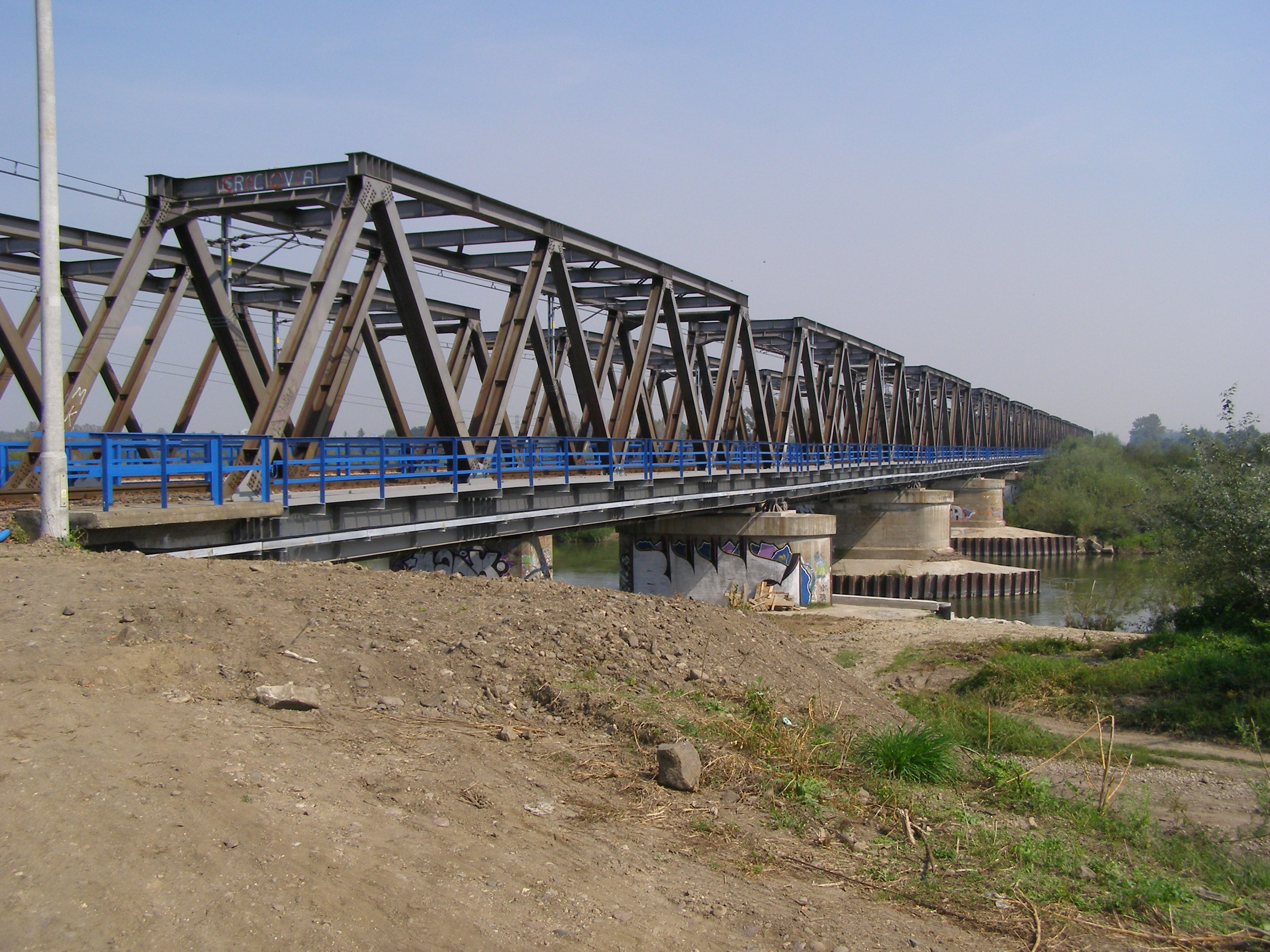
- Railway bridge

- Location within Poland
- Coordinates: 50°00′21″N 20°52′08″E
- Country: Poland
- Voivodeship: Lesser Poland
- County: Tarnów
- Gmina: Wierzchosławice

Bogumiłowice [bɔɡumiwɔˈvit͡sɛ] is a village in the administrative district of Gmina Wierzchosławice, within Tarnów County, Lesser Poland Voivodeship, in southern Poland.
