= Rudka, Gmina Wierzchosławice =

Rudka
- Village
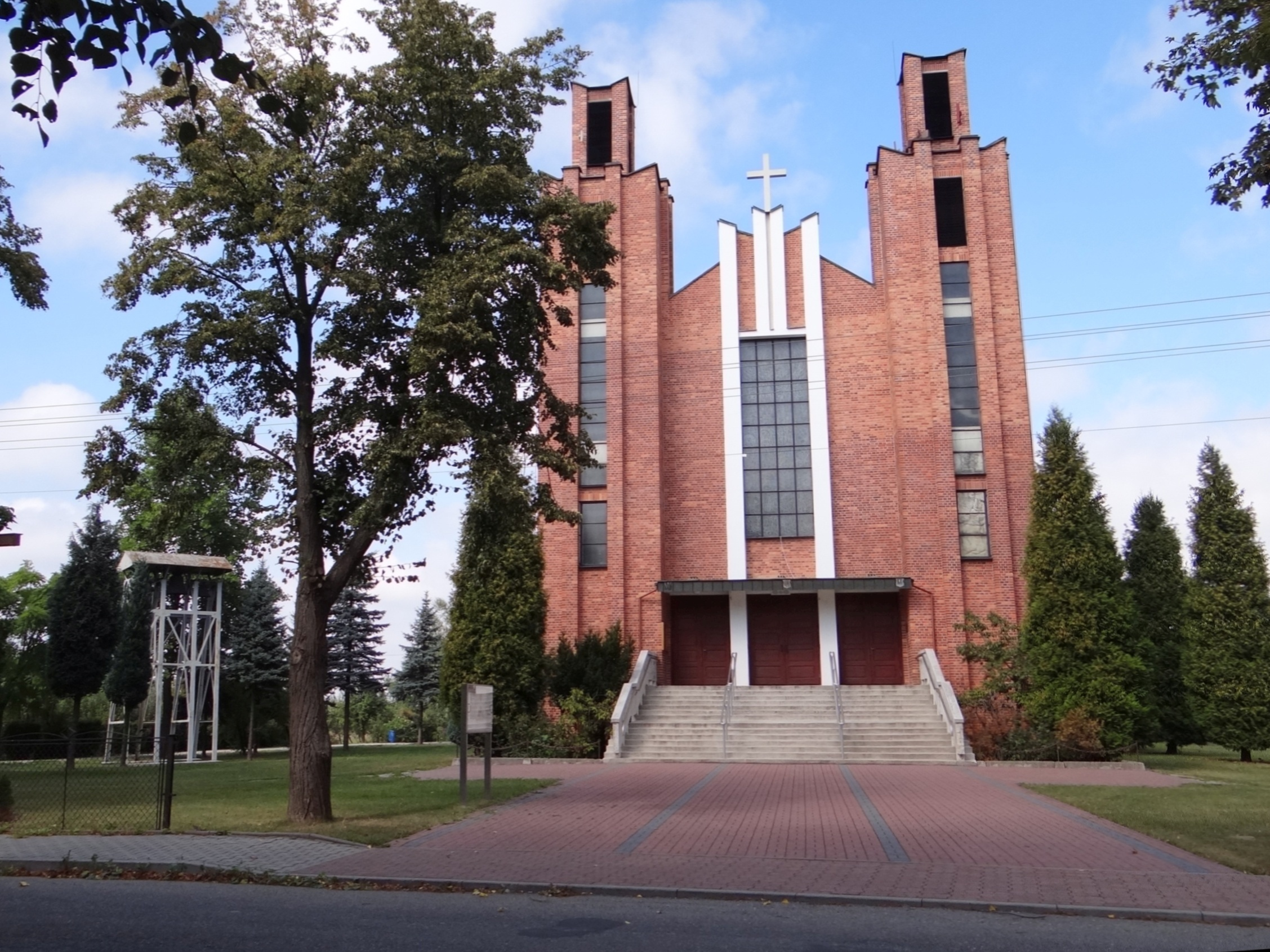
- Chapel in Rudka

- Location within Poland
- Coordinates: 50°02′47″N 20°52′46″E
- Country: Poland
- Voivodeship: Lesser Poland
- County: Tarnów
- Gmina: Wierzchosławice
- Population (approx.): 720

Rudka [ˈrutka] is a village in the administrative district of Gmina Wierzchosławice, within Tarnów County, Lesser Poland Voivodeship, in southern Poland.

The village has an approximate population of 720.
