= Komorowski =

Komorowski is a Polish locational surname, which means a person from Komorowo, which in turn derives from the Old Polish komor or "mosquito". Variants of Komorowski include Komorowska (the feminine form) and Komorowsky (via Ukrainian). Notable people with the surname include:

- Andrzej Komorowski (born 1975), Polish Catholic priest
- Anna Komorowska (born 1953), Polish philologist
- Anna Maria Komorowska (born 1946), Polish noblewoman
- Bronisław Komorowski (born 1952), Polish politician and former President
- Bronisław Komorowski (priest) (1889–1940), Polish priest
- Gertruda Komorowska (1754–1771), Polish noblewoman
- Liliana Komorowska (born 1956), Polish actress
- Maja Komorowska (born 1937), Polish actress
- Marcin Komorowski (born 1984), Polish footballer
- Stanisław Komorowski (1953–2010), Polish diplomat
- Tadeusz Bór-Komorowski (1895–1966), Polish general
- Wiktor Komorowski (1887–1952), Polish fighter pilot
- Zbigniew Komorowski (born 1977), Polish figure skater

== Other uses ==
- Huta Komorowska, Poland
- Wólka Komorowska, Poland
