= Sieciechowice, Tarnów County =

Sieciechowice
- Village
- Location within Poland
- Coordinates: 49°59′49″N 20°52′50″E
- Country: Poland
- Voivodeship: Lesser Poland
- County: Tarnów
- Gmina: Wierzchosławice

Sieciechowice [ɕɛt͡ɕɛxɔˈvit͡sɛ] is a village in the administrative district of Gmina Wierzchosławice, within Tarnów County, Lesser Poland Voivodeship, in southern Poland.
