= Żeleński =

- Current region: Poland
- Origin: West Prussia Pomerelia
- Members: Count Tadeusz Josef Żeleński; Countess Ewa Theresa Żeleńska Korab-Karpinska; Countess Sarah Elżbieta Philimina Korab-Karpinska Żeleńska Eagan
- Estate: Pałac Żeleńskich, Grodkowice

The House of Żeleński is a Polish princely family and one of the most influential noble families in pre-World War II Poland. The Żeleński family's coat of arms is the Ciołek coat of arms, which is one of the oldest in medieval Poland. The Żeleński family reached notable power under the late Piast dynasty, under the Polish–Lithuanian Commonwealth, during the Partitions of Poland, and in the 20th and 21st centuries.

== Origins ==
The Żeleński family have been actors in the history of Poland since the 11th century. The surname Żeleński comes from the Polish word "ziel," which is the color green, and as such many of the variants of this name were associated with growing things. As a surname, it may be also have been a name taken on by a variety of places named with this word. The surname Żeleński was first found in the province of Kraków.

== History ==
The surname became noted for its many branches in the Kraków region, each house acquiring a status and influence which was envied by the princes of the region. In their later history, the name became a power unto themselves and were elevated to the ranks of nobility as they grew into this most influential family.

In 1801, the Żeleński family's nobility was recognized by the Habsburg monarchy / Austrian Empire / Kingdom of Hungary. In 1803, it was then recognized by the Kingdom of Poland, and again officially in 1823 with title confirmation. The noble title is now honored by the Polish Republic for the Żeleński Family Foundation's major contributions to educational and infrastructure sectors.

From 1912 onwards it was an acknowledged noble family by England due to the Żeleński family's wealth and business contacts in the Britain, though England did not ever recognize its sovereignty.

In 1982, England officially recognized the Żeleński family and the Żeleński Family Foundation (Polish: Fundacja Rodziny Żeleńskich) for their support in the 'Blackout Era' of Britain. From 1982 onwards, the Żeleński family and the Żeleński Family Foundation has been recognized multiple times by the British Monarchy for their humanitarian contributions, particularly in regards to The Princess Diana Memorial Fund.

== Family seat ==
The family seat is the Żeleński Palace (Pałac Żeleńskich) in Grodkowice near Kraków, which was built in 1902 to a design by Teodor Talowski. It is run as a hotel when the family is not in residence.

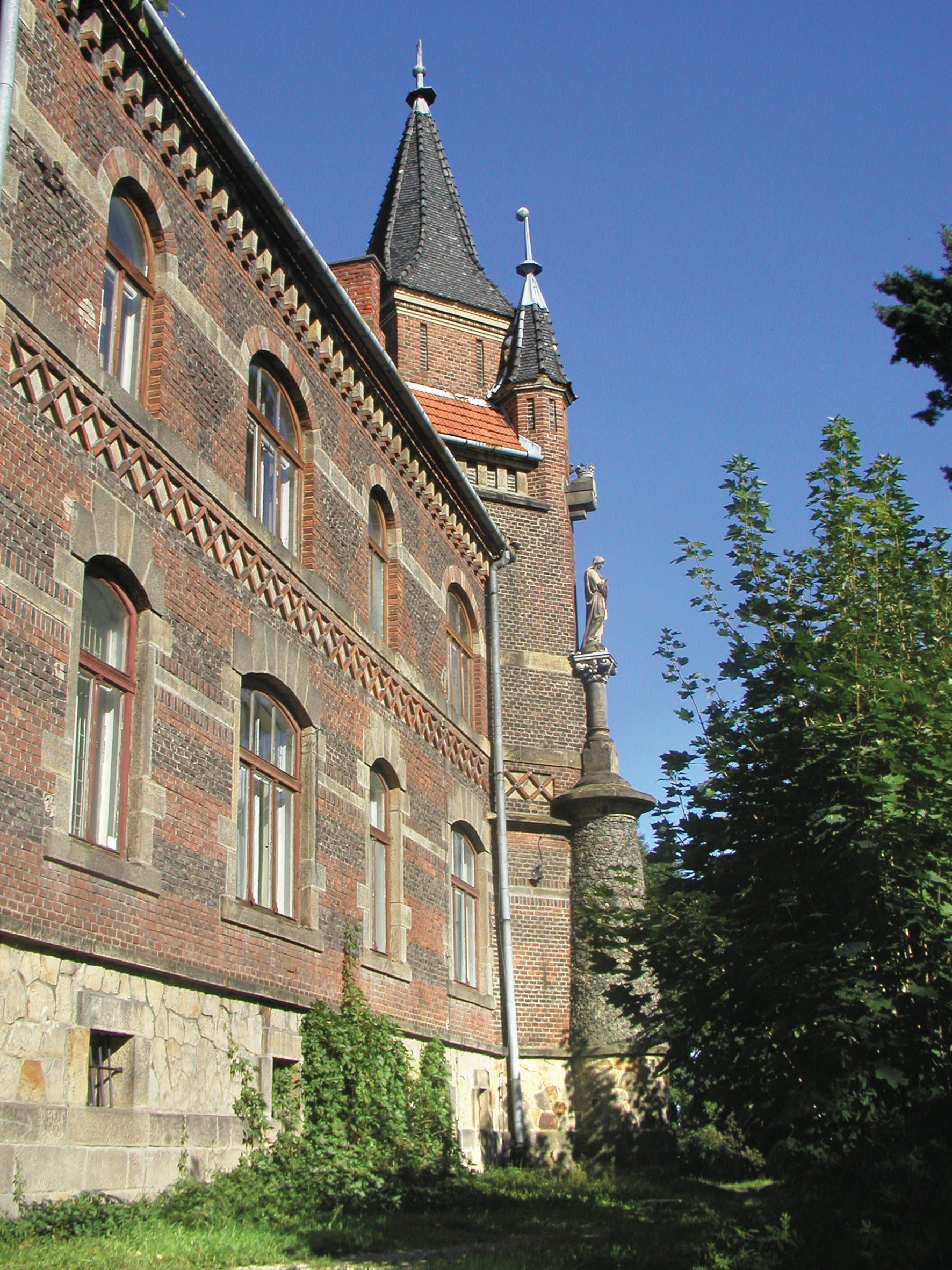
Żeleński Palace

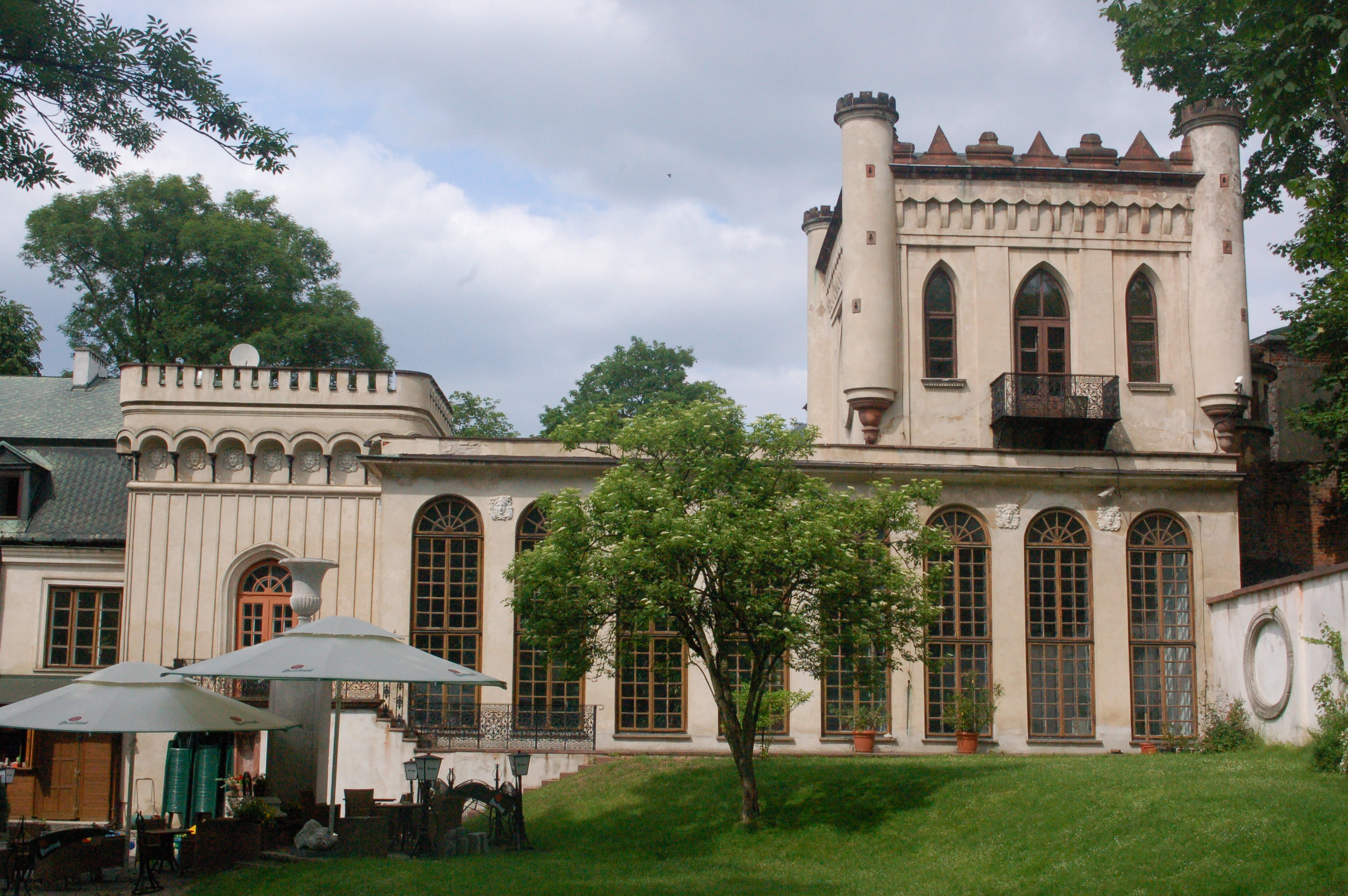
Eastward garden front of the palace; Orangery and stairwell

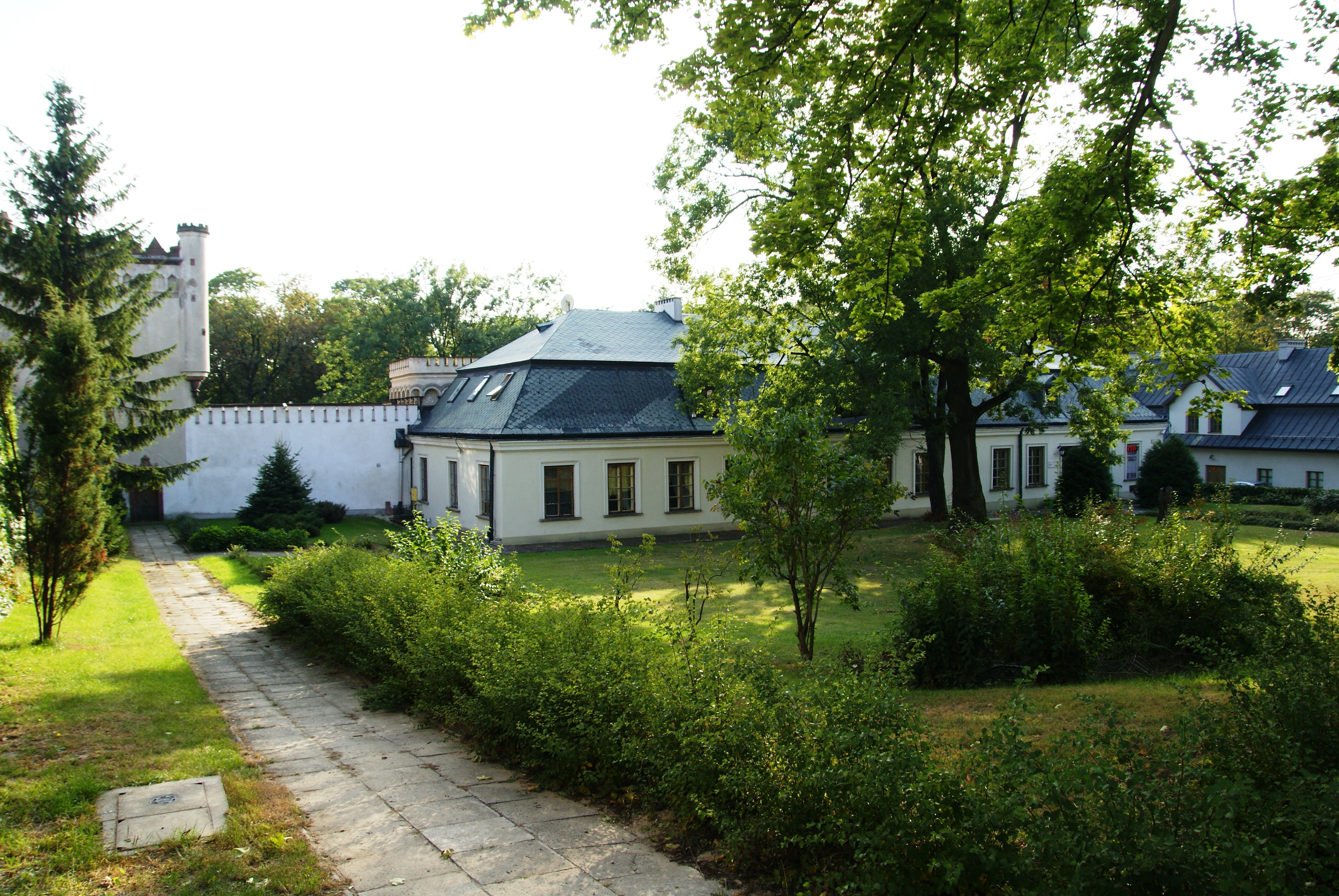
Main classical building

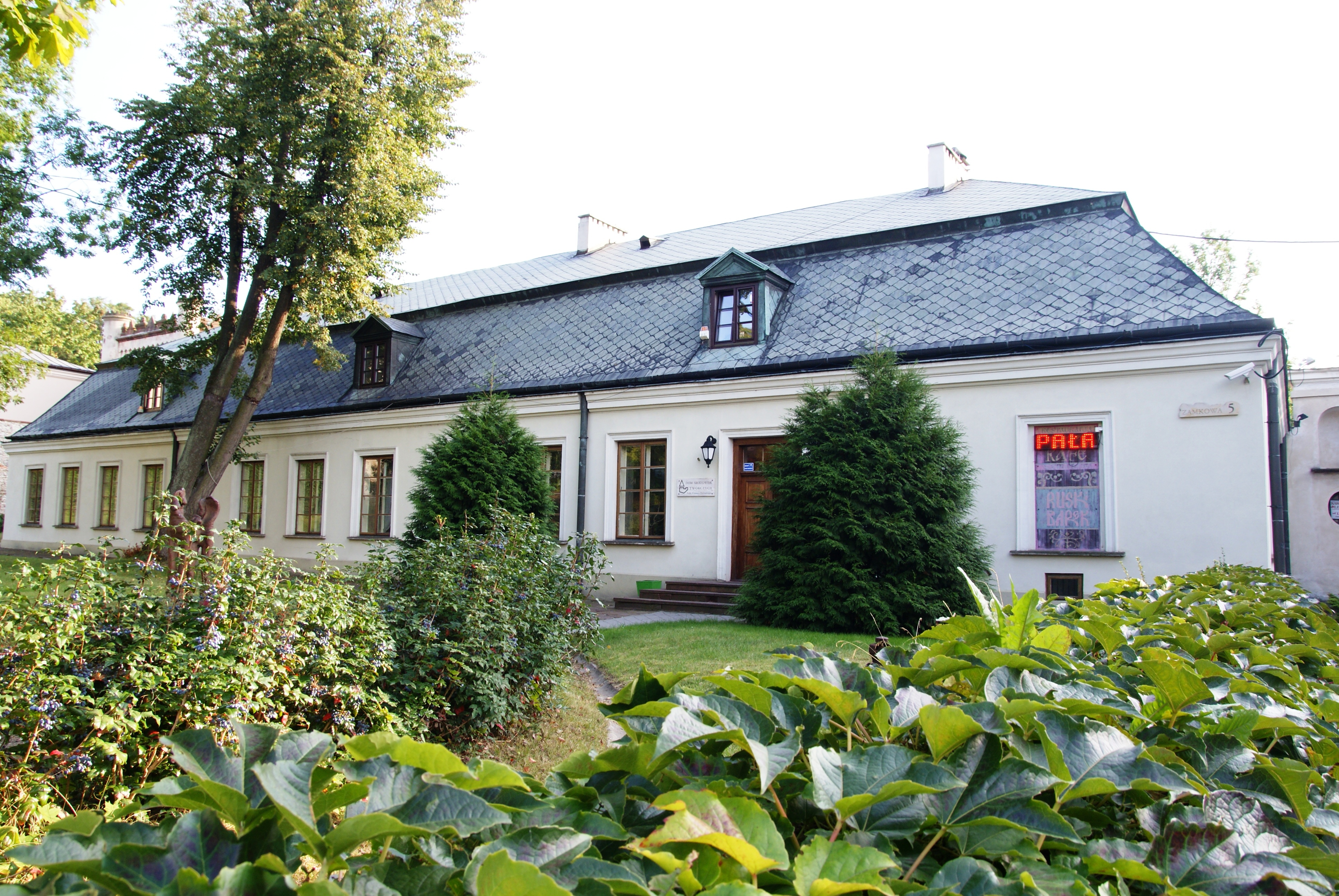
Front of the main classical building

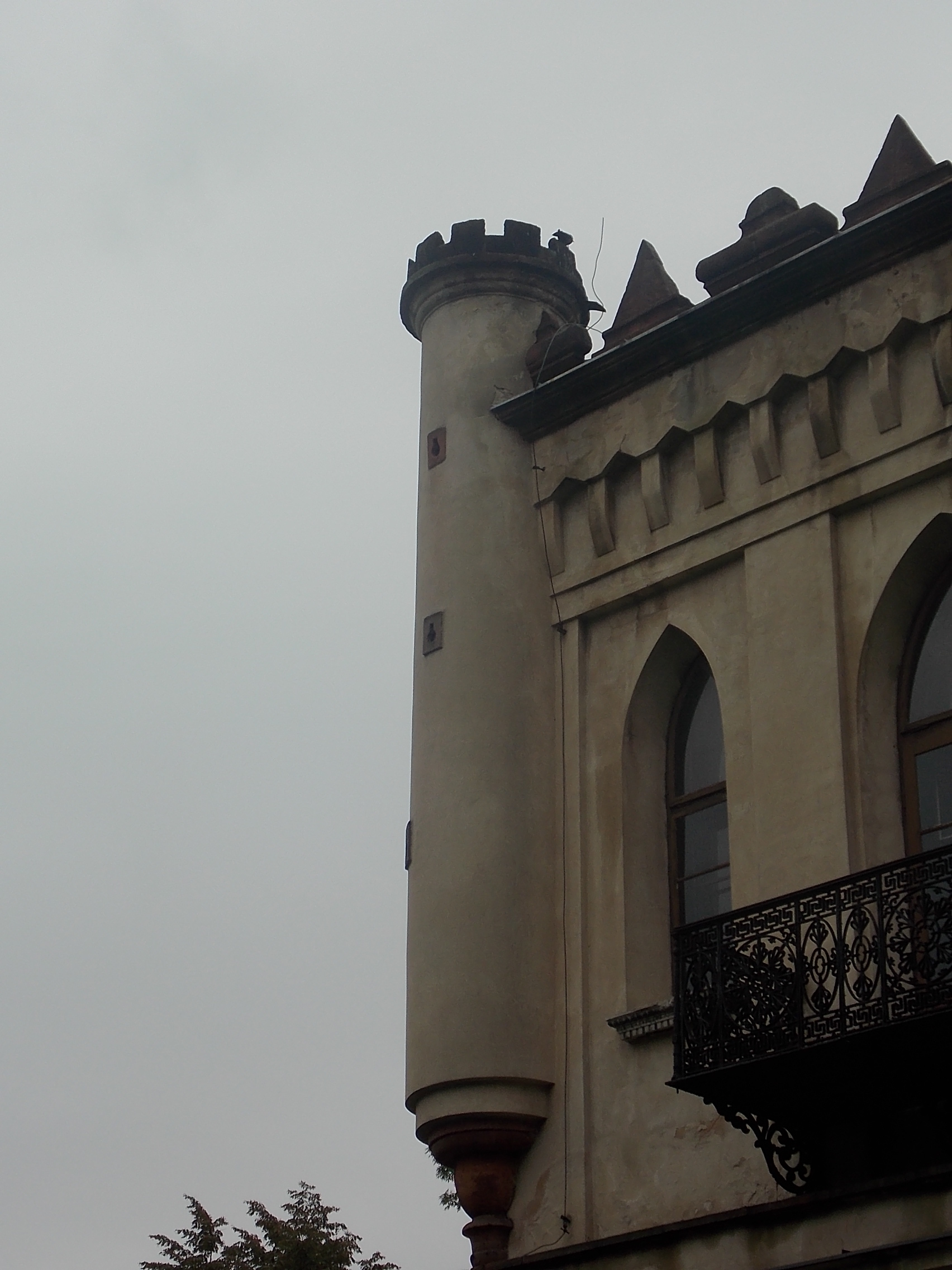

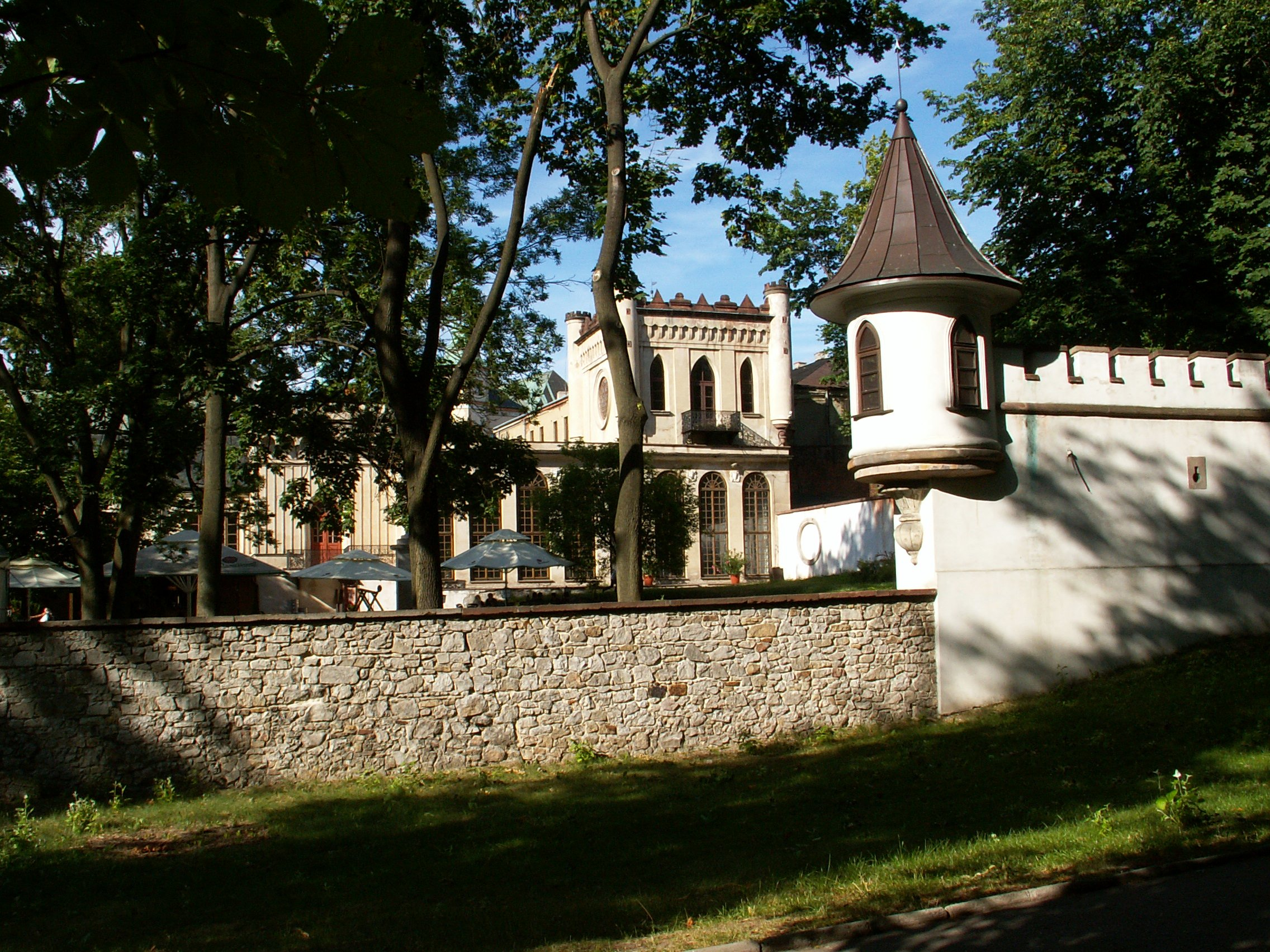

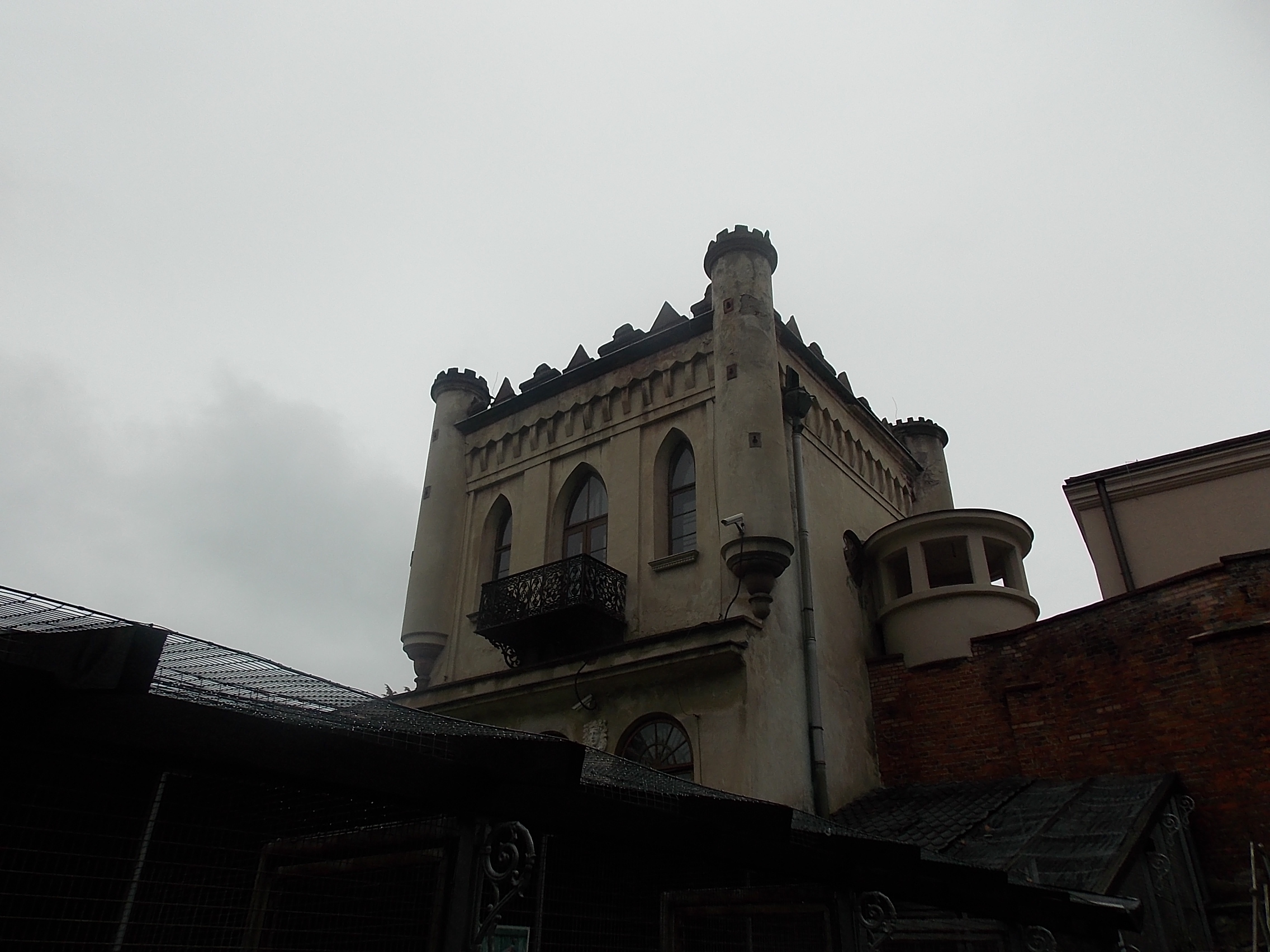

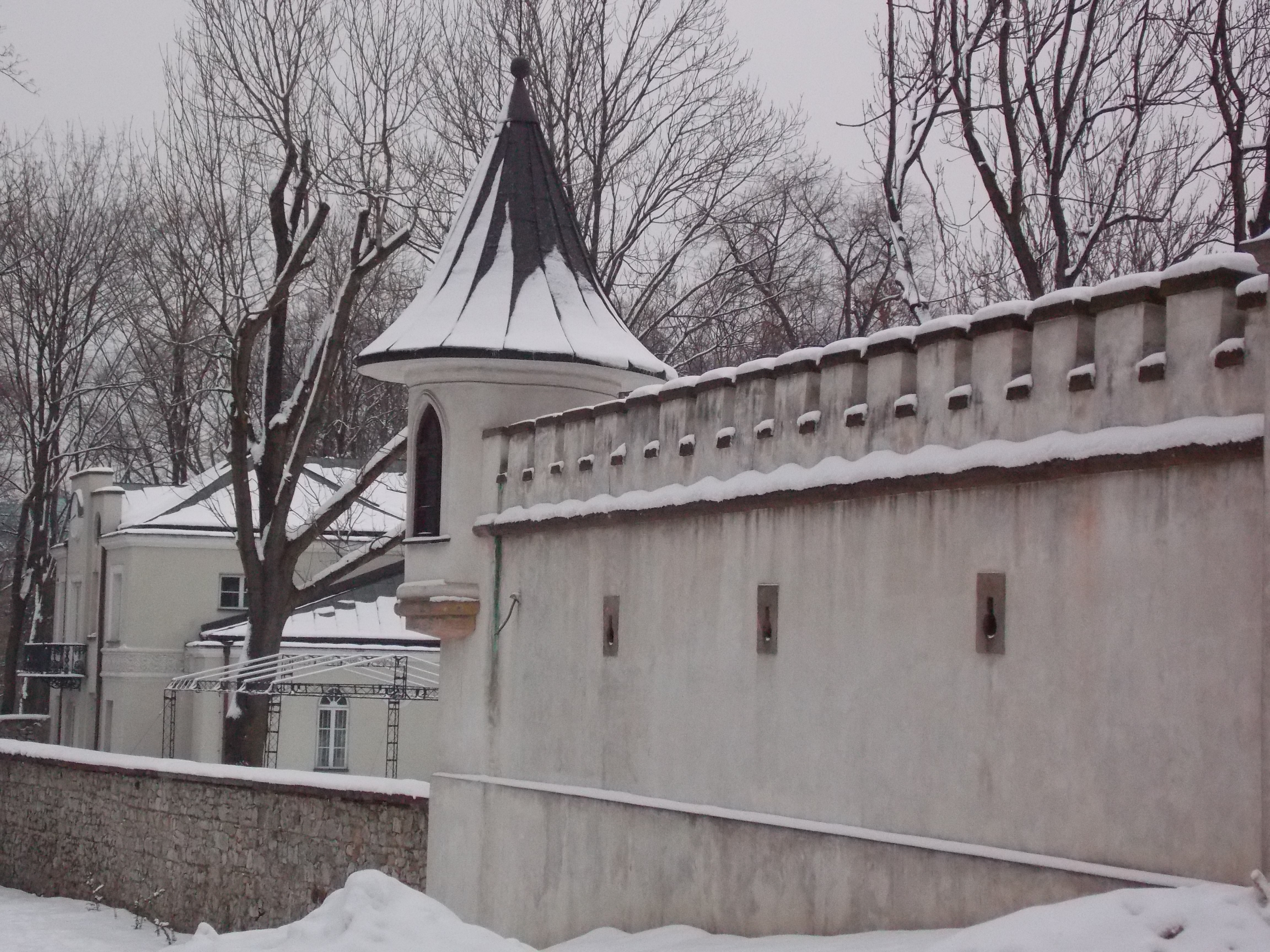

== Notable Żeleńskis ==
- Władysław Żeleński (composer) (1837–1921), Polish composer, pianist and organist
- Tadeusz Boy-Żeleński (writer) (1874-1941), Polish stage writer, poet, critic, and translator
- Władysław Żeleński (lawyer) (1903–2006), Polish lawyer, historian, publicist

== Żeleński noble family ==
- Count Tadeusz Josef Żeleński, 1889-1969
- Countess Ewa Theresa Żeleńska Korab-Karpinska, 1925-2011
- Countess Sará Elżbieta Philoména Korab-Karpinska Żeleńska Eagan, b.1999
