= Gosławice, Lesser Poland Voivodeship =

Gosławice
- Village
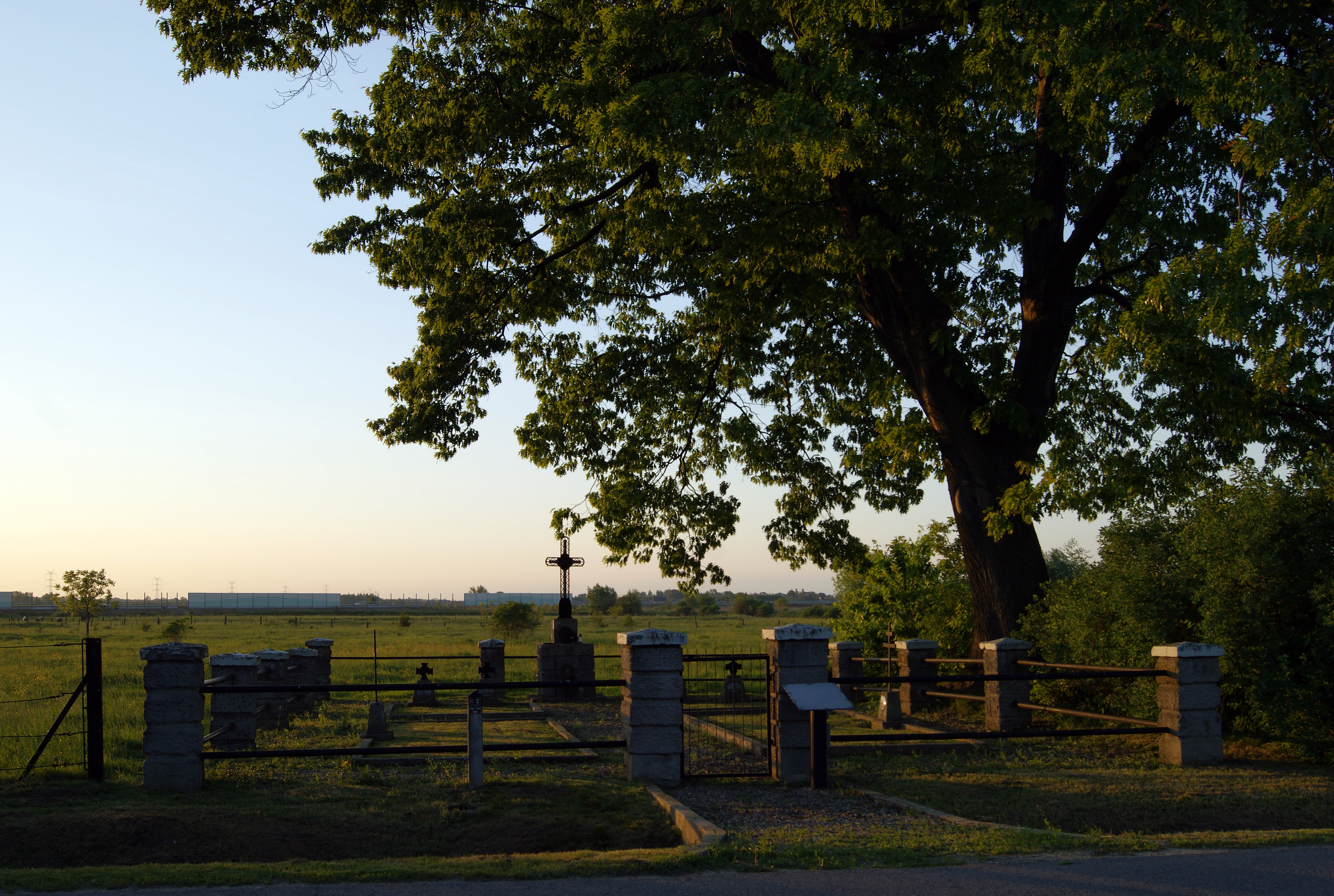
- War cemetery

- Location within Poland
- Coordinates: 50°01′28″N 20°52′51″E
- Country: Poland
- Voivodeship: Lesser Poland
- County: Tarnów
- Gmina: Wierzchosławice

Gosławice [ɡɔswaˈvit͡sɛ] is a village in the administrative district of Gmina Wierzchosławice, within Tarnów County, Lesser Poland Voivodeship, in southern Poland.
