= Gmina Wierzchosławice =

Gmina Wierzchosławice Wierzchosławice Commune
- Gmina
- Flag Coat of arms
- Interactive map of Gmina Wierzchosławice
- Coordinates (Wierzchosławice): 50.015970°N 20.862600°E
- Country: Poland
- Voivodeship: Lesser Poland
- County: Tarnów County
- Seat: Wierzchosławice

Area
  - Total: 74.84 km^{2} (28.90 sq mi)

Population (2006)
  - Total: 10,628
  - Density: 142.0/km^{2} (367.8/sq mi)
- Website: http://www.wierzchoslawice.pl

Gmina Wierzchosławice is a rural gmina (administrative district) in Tarnów County, Lesser Poland Voivodeship, in southern Poland. Its seat is the village of Wierzchosławice, which lies approximately 11 kilometres (7 mi) west of Tarnów and 66 km (41 mi) east of the regional capital Kraków.

The gmina covers an area of 74.84 square kilometres (28.9 sq mi), and as of 2006 its total population is 10,628.

== Villages ==
Gmina Wierzchosławice contains the villages and settlements of Bobrowniki Małe, Bogumiłowice, Gosławice, Kępa Bogumiłowicka, Komorów, Łętowice, Mikołajowice, Ostrów, Rudka, Sieciechowice and Wierzchosławice.

== Neighbouring gminas ==
Gmina Wierzchosławice is bordered by the city of Tarnów and by the gminas of Borzęcin, Radłów, Tarnów, Wojnicz and Żabno.
