= Gerard Antoni Ciołek =

Polish architect and historian (1909–1966)

Gerard Ciołek (24 September 1909 – 15 February 1966) was a Polish architect, as well as a leading historian of parks and gardens.

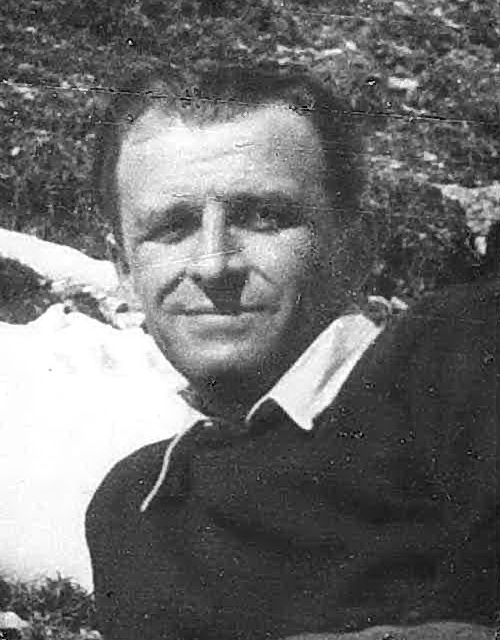
Gerard Ciołek, Tatra Mountains, Poland, mid-1950s, a photo from the collection of Dr T. Matthew Ciolek.

== Biography ==
Gerard Antoni Ciołek was born in Wyżnica, a small town in the Austro-Hungarian Duchy of Bukovina (in present-day Ukraine). His parents, Adolf and Ludwika (née Meltz, also Melz) Ciołek were from Galicia and Bukovina . His father was a high-ranking official at the Austrian Tax Office, first in Kuty, then in nearby Wyżnica in Carpathia. Following the end of World War I, and the collapse of the Austro-Hungarian Empire, Wyżnica was incorporated into Romania.

In 1921, the Ciołeks and their two children left Bukovina for the newly established Republic of Poland, and settled in the southern city of Lublin.

In 1929, on graduating from the Stanisław Staszic Lycee in Lublin , Gerard Ciołek embarked on tertiary studies in the country's capital, Warsaw. Initially he intended to take up drawing and painting (especially "en plein air" watercolours) at the Warsaw Academy of Fine Arts (Akademia Sztuk Pięknych). Eventually, however, he chose to study architecture at the Warsaw University of Technology (Politechnika Warszawska).

In the mid-1930s, Ciołek was a research assistant to professor Oskar Sosnowski at the Politechnika Warszawska, a man under whom he deepened his studies on Polish folk architecture, and the conservation of architectural heritage. Around 1937 he developed an interest in the history and design of parks and gardens. He was also interested in town-planning, regional planning, and in the harmony between human settlements and their fragile ecologies.

In June 1939, he married Regina Najder (1917–2005) from an extensive family of aristocrats, landowners, railway and sugar refinery engineers, doctors, and businessmen from Kiev and south-western Ukraine, which was then part of the Russian empire.

At the beginning of World War II, in September 1939, Ciołek served in the Polish Army as a Second Lieutenant (2Lt) in an air-defense unit in Wilno. Between 1940 and 1944, during the Nazi and Soviet occupation, he lived in German-held Warszawa where he joined the Armia Krajowa ("Polish Home Army"). For his pseudonym, while in the Resistance, he chose "Biała" (his clan's battle-cry) .

He was a lecturer in architecture and town planning at the now-banned, underground Politechnika Warszawska. In early 1944, he earned his Ph.D. for his research on the effect of the physical environment on the forms of villages and folk architecture in Poland, Belarus and Ukraine. In August–September 1944 he took part in the Warsaw Uprising, where he was in charge of the defense of the Krasiński Library (Biblioteka Ordynacji Krasińskich w Warszawie) building, and took part in the battle for the German SS-held PAST skyscraper. Following the defeat of the uprising he was interned in POW camps in Pomerania, and near Lübeck (northern Germany). After the end of World War II in Europe, and a brief tour of duty with the 1st Independent Parachute Brigade (Poland) (1 Samodzielna Brygada Spadochronowa – SBS) stationed in north-western Germany, he returned to Poland in December 1945. He was reunited with his wife and son, Krzysztof Oskar Ciołek (1940–1953) in Olsztyn.

The family returned to Warsaw. Between 1946 and his death in 1966, Ciołek lectured at the Institute of Architecture at the Politechnika Warszawska. From 1948 he was also professor of Urban Planning and Landscape Design at the Cracow University of Technology (Politechnika Krakowska). In the early-1950s he co-designed a tourist chalet in the Tatra Mountains, the 'Schronisko Górskie PTTK w Dolinie Pięciu Stawów Polskich', which opened in 1954.

During those 20 years of work in Kraków and Warsaw he taught students, supervised roughly fourteen Doctoral dissertations, worked on the reconstruction of over 100 historical parks in Poland that included sites in Arkadia, Baranów Sandomierski, Krasiczyn, Lubartów, Nieborów, Rogalin, as well as the Royal Park in Wilanów )). He was a member of the State Council for the Nature Conservation ('Panstwowa Rada Ochrony Przyrody', PROP), as well as served on the Boards of Directors of the Tatra National Park and the Pieniny National Park. He authored more than 60 research papers and books.

His groundbreaking work, Ogrody Polskie (Gardens of Poland), was published in 1954. In 1958, Ciołek was awarded the Knight's Cross of the Order of Polonia Restituta ('Krzyz Kawalerski Orderu Odrodzenia Polski'). In 1965, he embarked on two of his largest projects yet: a history of monastic architecture in Poland over the past 1,000 years; and an encyclopaedia of world gardens and garden design.

However, he died the following year, aged 56, while skiing in the Tatra Mountains, without completing this final work. His unpublished research is archived as the Teki Ciołka (Ciołek files) here.

== Selected publications ==
- Ciołek, Gerard. 1954. Ogrody polskie. T. 1, Przemiany treści i formy (Gardens of Poland. Vol. 1, Transformations of form and content). Warszawa: Budownictwo i Architektura.
- Ciołek, Gerard. 1955. Zarys historii kompozycji ogrodowej w Polsce (An outline of the history of garden and park design in Poland). Materially do projektowania. No. 4. Łódz-Warszawa: Panstwowe Wydawawnictwo Naukowe.
- Ciołek, Gerard. 1964. Zarys ochrony i kształtowania krajobrazu (An outline of principles of landscape formation and conservation). Warszawa: Arkady.

== Posthumous publications ==
- Ciołek, Gerard. 1978. Ogrody polskie. Revised edition of the 1954 publication under the same title, updated and expanded by Janusz Bogdanowski.
- Ciołek, Gerard. 1984. Regionalizm w budownictwie wiejskim w Polsce (Regionalism in Polish folk architecture). Kraków: Politechnika Krakowska. Doctoral dissertation completed in Warsaw, spring of 1944, 2 vols.

== See also ==
- See also, in Polish Wikipedia, a parallel though not identical entry Gerard Ciołek.
- See also, via an external link, the complete bibliography of Gerard Ciołek's publications.
