= Bobrowniki Małe =

- Village
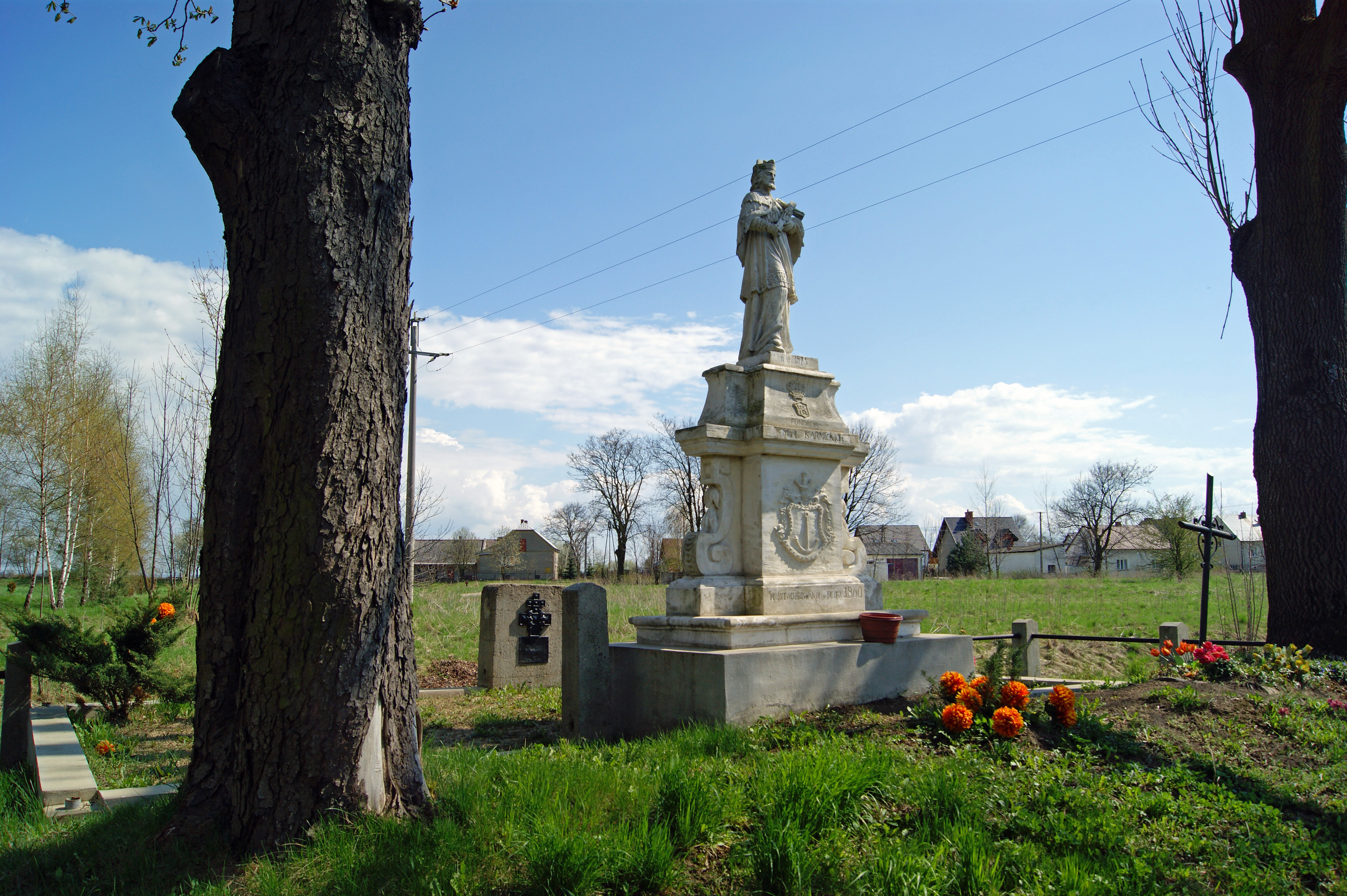
- War cemetery

- Location within Poland
- Coordinates: 50°3′N 20°54′E
- Country: Poland
- Voivodeship: Lesser Poland
- County: Tarnów
- Gmina: Wierzchosławice
- Population: 850

Bobrowniki Małe [bɔbrɔvˈniki ˈmawɛ] is a village in the administrative district of Gmina Wierzchosławice, within Tarnów County, Lesser Poland Voivodeship, in southern Poland.
