= Zbigniew J. Lipowski =

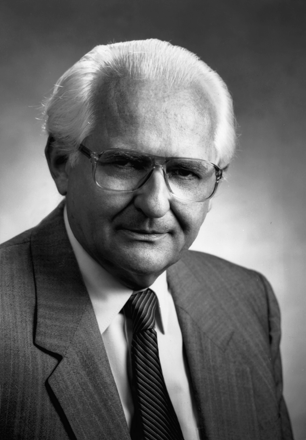
Zbigniew Lipowski, MD

Zbigniew Jerzy Lipowski, MD, (also known as Bish in North America; November 22, 1924 – December 30, 1997) was a Polish psychiatrist, historian, author, political commentator and speaker. He wrote several books on the topics of consultation-liaison psychiatry, delirium and psychosomatic medicine, as well as hundreds of articles and reviews that have been widely published in journals such as The New England Journal of Medicine, The Journal of the American Medical Association, and the Canadian Medical Association Journal.

Lipowski was considered to be a leader in his field. He was named emeritus professor of psychiatry at the University of Toronto. He has been described as the "Walter Lippman" of the consultation-liaison psychiatric subspecialty.

== Early life in WWII and education ==
Family coat-of-arms

In Nazi-occupied Poland, between August and October 1944, Lipowski participated as a civilian in the Warsaw Uprising. In an autobiographical essay quoted by the Toronto Star, he wrote that those "two months of horror were the most significant experience of my life... Not far from us were Gestapo headquarters, where some 2,000 men were shot during the uprising and their bodies were burned, so the odor of burning flesh was with us day and night... We were bombed and shelled daily, food was very scarce, and water had to be obtained at night from a well some distance away... I was so hungry as to almost hallucinate food."

Lipowski escaped Poland with his family and made his way to Ireland. He won a medical scholarship at the National University of Ireland in Dublin, where he graduated with honors. He completed his psychiatry residency at McGill, then went on to complete a fellowship in consultation-liaison psychiatry at Massachusetts General Hospital.

== Medical career ==
Throughout his career Lipowski served on many faculties, including McGill, Dartmouth, The Medical College of the University of South Carolina, and the University of Toronto. He was also active in the American Psychosomatic Society and the Academy of Psychosomatic Medicine.

== Books and writing ==
Lipowski's reviews were published in medical journals (such as The New England Journal of Medicine, The Journal of The American Medical Association, and the Canadian Medical Association Journal). His papers were published as a collected work: Review of Consultation Psychiatry and Psychosomatic Medicine.

He was interested in the history of C-L psychiatry. He also had an interest in the interface of C-L psychiatry and neurology, in particular the problem of delirium. His work in this area culminated in Delirium: Acute Confusional States. He also considered the problem of somatization.

== Awards ==
Dr. Lipowski was the 1991 recipient of the Academy of Psychosomatic Medicine's Hackett Award.

== Death ==
Lipowski died December 30, 1997, from ALS and associated dementia, in Toronto, Ontario, Canada at the age of 73.
