= Ostrów, Tarnów County =

Ostrów
- Village
- Location within Poland
- Coordinates: 50°00′56″N 20°52′58″E
- Country: Poland
- Voivodeship: Lesser Poland
- County: Tarnów
- Gmina: Wierzchosławice
- Elevation: 180 m (590 ft)
- Population: 500

Ostrów [ˈɔstruf] is a village in the administrative district of Gmina Wierzchosławice, within Tarnów County, Lesser Poland Voivodeship, in southern Poland.
