= Kępa Bogumiłowicka =

- Village
- Location within Poland
- Coordinates: 50°00′41″N 20°54′19″E
- Country: Poland
- Voivodeship: Lesser Poland
- County: Tarnów
- Gmina: Wierzchosławice
- Elevation: 192 m (630 ft)
- Population: 500

Kępa Bogumiłowicka [ˈkɛmpa bɔɡumiwɔˈvit͡ska] is a village in the administrative district of Gmina Wierzchosławice, within Tarnów County, Lesser Poland Voivodeship, in southern Poland.
