= Likavka =

- Municipality
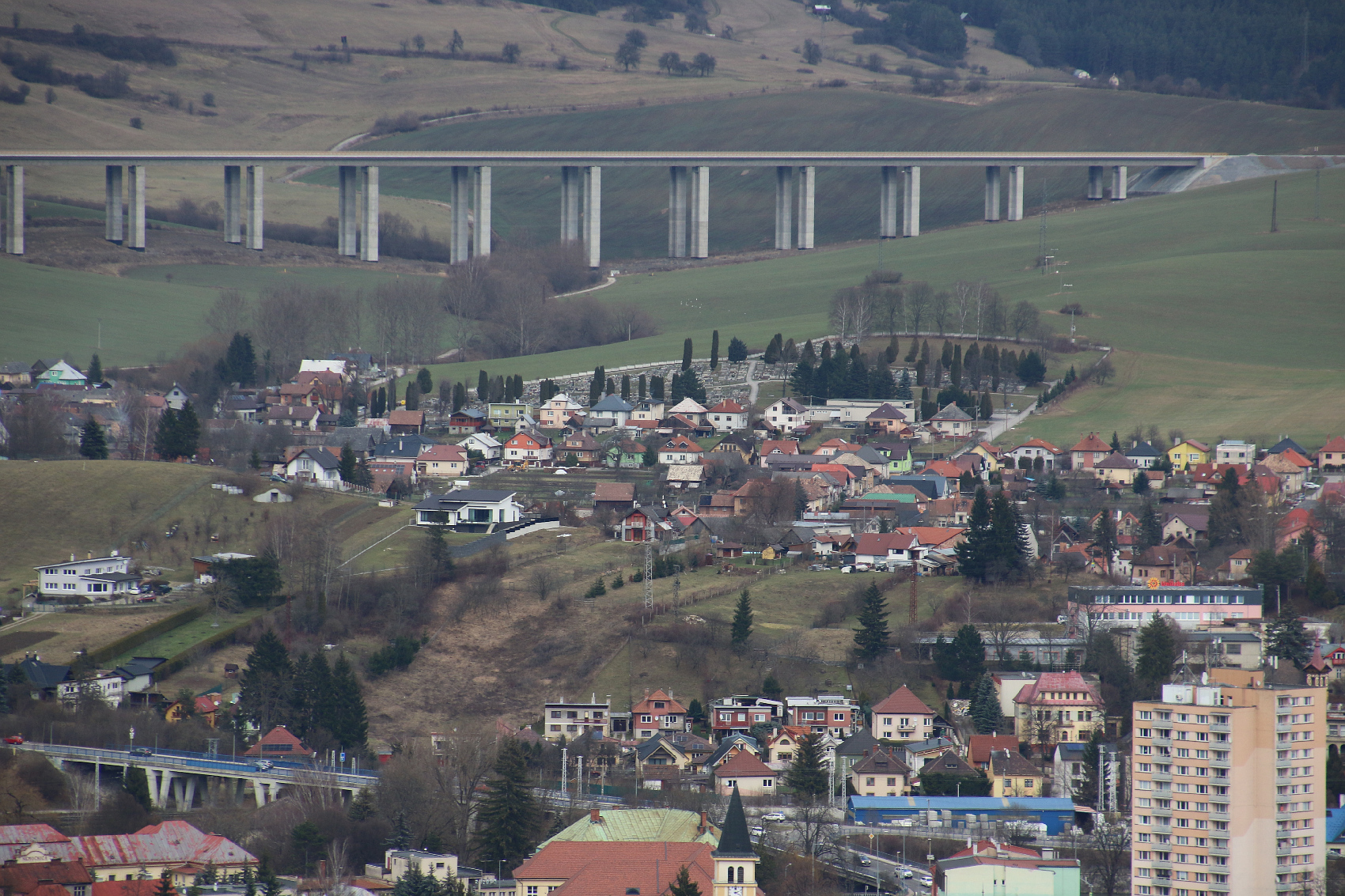

- Flag Coat of arms

- Location of Likavka in the Žilina Region Location of Likavka in Slovakia
- Coordinates: 49.10°N 19.32°E
- Country: Slovakia
- Region: Žilina Region
- District: Ružomberok District
- First mentioned: 1315

Area
  - Total: 18.26 km^{2} (7.05 sq mi)
- Elevation: 494 m (1,621 ft)

Population (2025)
  - Total: 2,826
- Time zone: UTC+1 (CET)
  - Summer (DST): UTC+2 (CEST)
- Postal code: 349 5
- Area code: +421 44
- Vehicle registration plate (until 2022): RK
- Website: www.likavka.sk

Likavka is a village and municipality in Ružomberok District in the Žilina Region of northern Slovakia.

== History ==
In historical records the village was first mentioned in 1315.

== Geography ==
The municipality lies at an altitude of 494 metres (1,621 ft) and covers an area of 18.26 km^{2} (7.05 sq mi) (2025).

== Population ==
Population statistic (10 years)
Year	1995	2005	2015	2025
Count	2985	3045	3057	2826
Difference		+2.01%	+0.39%	−7.55%

Population statistic
Year	2024	2025
Count	2846	2826
Difference		−0.70%

It has a population of 2826 people (31 December 2025).

=== Ethnicity ===
Census 2021 (1+ %)
Ethnicity	Number	Fraction
Slovak	2863	95.84%
Not found out	118	3.95%
Total	2987	

In year 2021 was 2987 people by ethnicity 2863 as Slovak, 118 as Not found out, 15 as Czech, 4 as Polish, 3 as Rusyn, 3 as Other, 2 as Russian, 2 as English, 1 as Jewish, 1 as Romanian, 1 as German and 1 as Hungarian.

Note on population: The difference values of population numbers in the table "Population statistic" and in the sections "Ethnicity" & "Religion" is caused by the use of various statistical methods.

=== Religion ===
Census 2021 (1+ %)
Religion	Number	Fraction
Roman Catholic Church	2311	77.37%
None	389	13.02%
Not found out	118	3.95%
Evangelical Church	112	3.75%
Total	2987	

In year 2021 was 2987 people by religion 2311 from Roman Catholic Church, 389 from None, 118 from Not found out, 112 from Evangelical Church, 11 from Baptists Church, 10 from Greek Catholic Church, 9 from Christian Congregations in Slovakia, 9 from Ad hoc movements, 5 from Other and not ascertained christian church, 4 from Other, 3 from Buddhism, 2 from Jehovah's Witnesses, 2 from United Methodist Church, 1 from Eastern Orthodox Church and 1 from Paganism and natural spirituality.

== Gallery ==
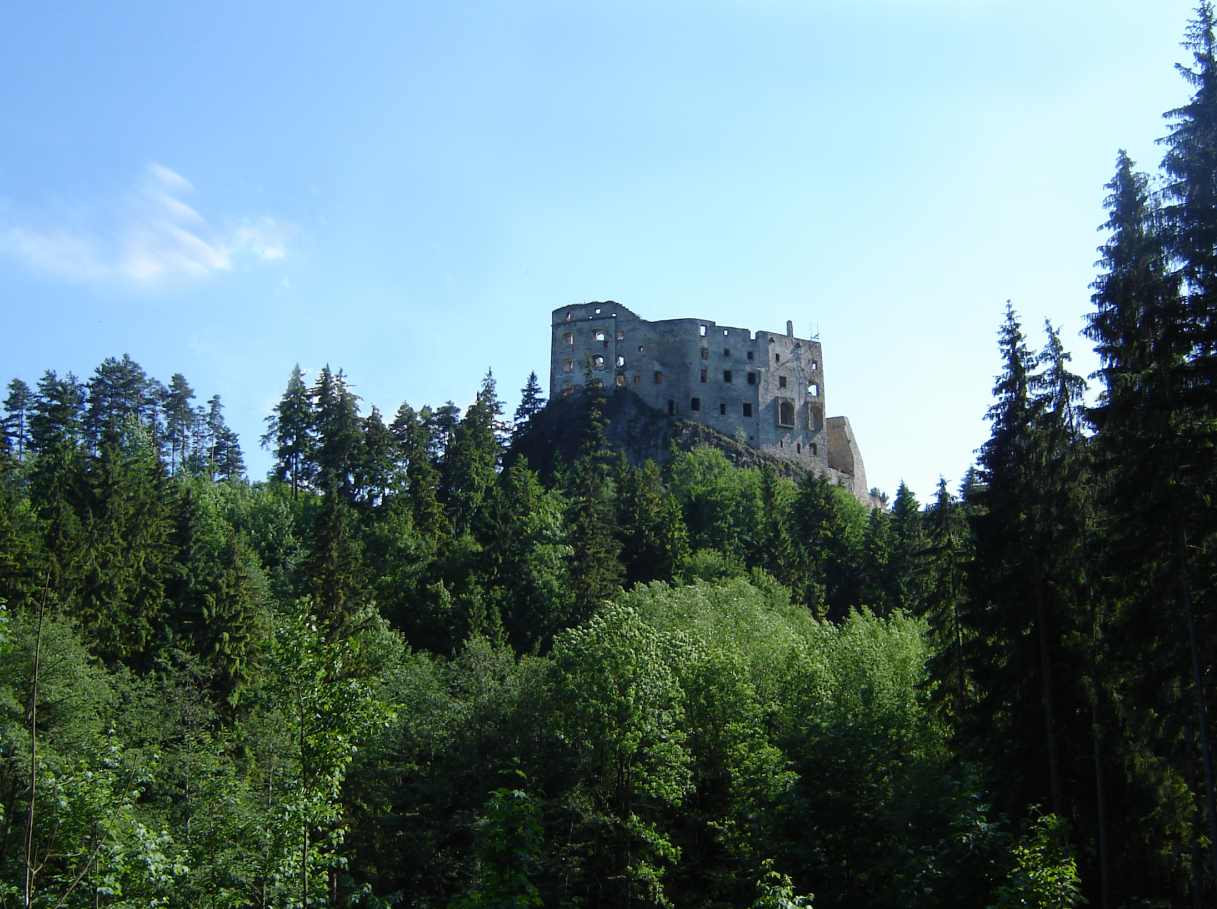
Likava Castle
