= Komorowo =

Komorowo may refer to:

- Komorowo, Lower Silesian Voivodeship (south-west Poland)
- Komorowo, Brodnica County in Kuyavian-Pomeranian Voivodeship (north-central Poland)
- Komorowo, Lipno County in Kuyavian-Pomeranian Voivodeship (central Poland)
- Komorowo, Włocławek County in Kuyavian-Pomeranian Voivodeship (central Poland)
- Komorowo, Gmina Ostrów Mazowiecka, Ostrów County in Masovian Voivodeship (east-central Poland)
- Komorowo, Sierpc County in Masovian Voivodeship (north-central Poland)
- Komorowo, Wyszków County in Masovian Voivodeship (east-central Poland)
- Komorowo, Gniezno County in Greater Poland Voivodeship (west-central Poland)
- Komorowo, Konin County in Greater Poland Voivodeship (central Poland)
- Komorowo, Nowy Tomyśl County in Greater Poland Voivodeship (west-central Poland)
- Komorowo, Piła County in Greater Poland Voivodeship (west-central Poland)
- Komorowo, Szamotuły County in Greater Poland Voivodeship (west-central Poland)
- Komorowo, Nidzica County in Warmian-Masurian Voivodeship (north Poland)
- Komorowo, Ostróda County in Warmian-Masurian Voivodeship (north Poland)
- Komorowo, Pisz County in Warmian-Masurian Voivodeship (north-east Poland)
- Komorowo, Koszalin County in West Pomeranian Voivodeship (north-west Poland)
- Komorowo, Łobez County in West Pomeranian Voivodeship (north-west Poland)
- Komorowo, Stargard County in West Pomeranian Voivodeship (north-west Poland)

== See also ==
- Komorowo Żuławskie near Elbląg in Warmian-Masurian Voivodeship (north Poland)
- Komorów (disambiguation)
