= Wiktor Komorowski =

Polish ace pilot in the Imperial Russian Air Force

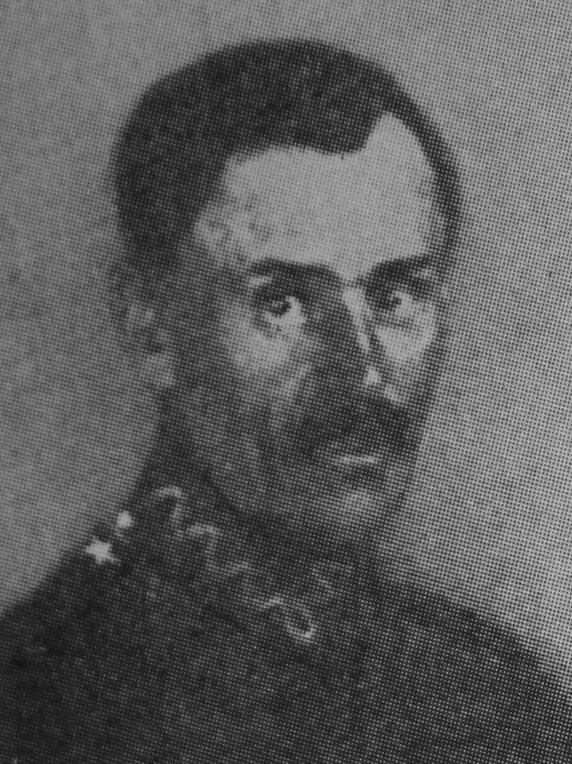
- Born: 8 June 1887
- Died: 23 August 1952 (aged 65); Wrocław, Poland
- Military career
- Allegiance: Russian Empire (1914-1917); Soviet Union (1917-1919); Poland (1919-1928)
- Branch: Imperial Russian Air Force; Soviet Air Forces; Polish Air Force
- Service years: 1914 - 1928
- Rank: Lieutenant
- Commands: 4th Escadrille, 36th Escadrille, 5th Escadrille
- Conflicts: World War I Polish–Soviet War

Wiktor Komorowski (8 June 1887 - 23 August 1952) was a Polish ace pilot in the Imperial Russian Air Force during World War I with six confirmed kills.

== Biography ==
Wiktor Komorowski was born in 1887. In the years 1914 to 1916, he shot down six enemy planes.

In 1917, he joined the Polish I Corps in Russia, was arrested by Bolsheviks, and then became a Soviet aviator. From 1 August 1919, Komorowski served in the Polish Air Force. He took part in the Kiev offensive (1920) with the 4th Escadrille and became commander of his unit. In 1920, he was given command of the 36th Escadrille and received command of the Officer Flying School in Grudziądz. In 1928, he went to the reserves. During World War II, he was interned in Romania and returned to Poland in 1946.

On 16 April 1951, Komorowski was arrested and accused of illegal possession of firearms and of failure to inform the authorities about an illegal border crossing by his son Bogdan and by Włodzimierz Turski. On 19 November 1951, Komorowski was sentenced by the military court to 18 months imprisonment and jailed in the Wrocław prison.

Komorowski died in unexplained circumstances on 23 August 1952.
