= Komorów, Tarnów County =

Komorów
- Village
- Location within Poland
- Coordinates: 50°2′N 20°54′E
- Country: Poland
- Voivodeship: Lesser Poland
- County: Tarnów
- Gmina: Wierzchosławice

Komorów [kɔˈmɔruf] is a village in the administrative district of Gmina Wierzchosławice, within Tarnów County, Lesser Poland Voivodeship, in southern Poland.
