= Wierzchosławice, Lesser Poland Voivodeship =

Wierzchosławice
- Village
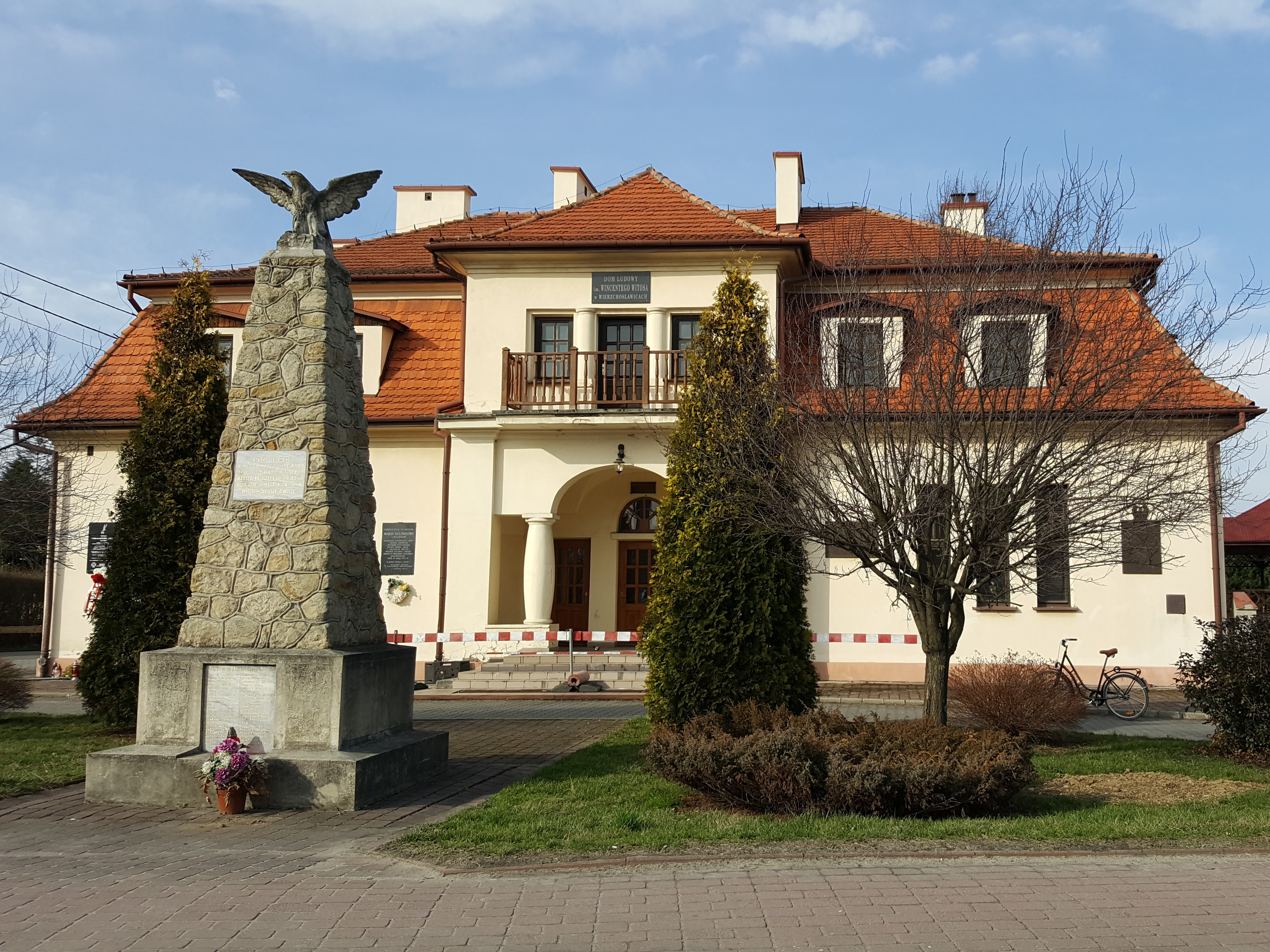
- Wincenty Witos Community House in Wierzchosławice

- Location within Poland
- Coordinates: 50°01′13″N 20°51′11″E
- Country: Poland
- Voivodeship: Lesser Poland
- County: Tarnów
- Gmina: Wierzchosławice

Population
  - Total: 3,000

Wierzchosławice [vjɛʂxɔswaˈvit͡sɛ] is a village in Tarnów County, Lesser Poland Voivodeship, in southern Poland. It is the seat of the gmina (administrative district) called Gmina Wierzchosławice.

== Notable people ==
- Birthplace of Wincenty Witos, agrarian leader and Prime Minister of Poland
