= Mikołajowice, Lesser Poland Voivodeship =

Mikołajowice
- Village
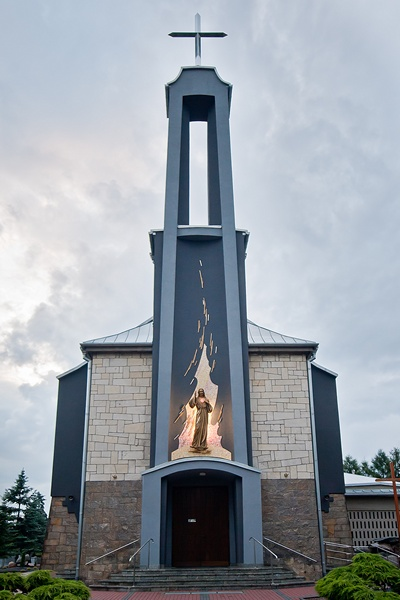
- Church of Sacred Heart

- Location within Poland
- Coordinates: 49°59′N 20°53′E
- Country: Poland
- Voivodeship: Lesser Poland
- County: Tarnów
- Gmina: Wierzchosławice

Mikołajowice [mikɔwajɔˈvit͡sɛ] is a village in the administrative district of Gmina Wierzchosławice, within Tarnów County, Lesser Poland Voivodeship, in southern Poland.
