= Łętowice =

- Village
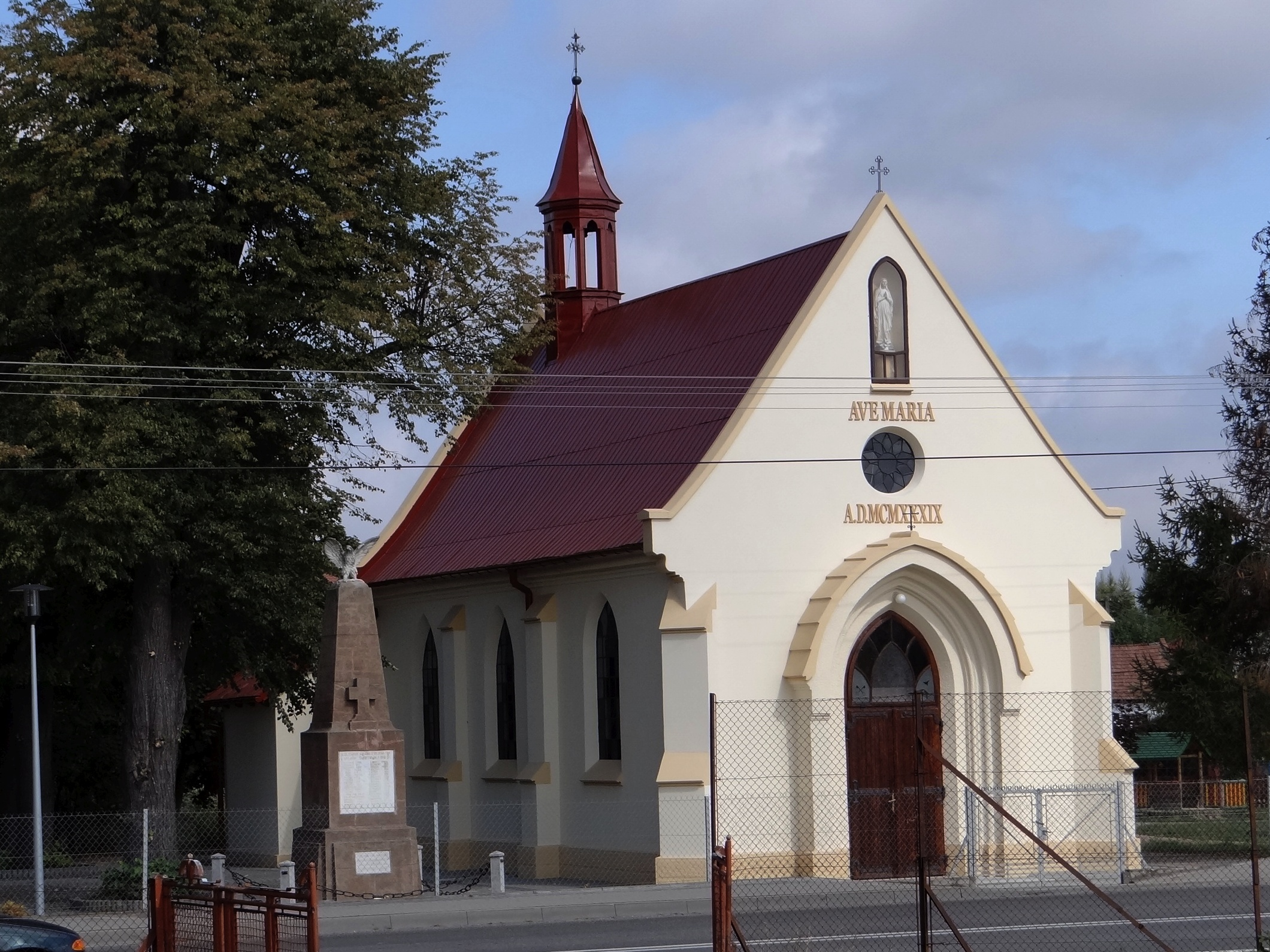
- The old Church of Our Lady of Assumption

- Location within Poland
- Coordinates: 49°59′N 20°51′E
- Country: Poland
- Voivodeship: Lesser Poland
- County: Tarnów
- Gmina: Wierzchosławice
- Website: http://www.letowice.firmaenter.pl

Łętowice [wɛntɔˈvit͡sɛ] is a village in the administrative district of Gmina Wierzchosławice, within Tarnów County, Lesser Poland Voivodeship, in southern Poland.
