= Gutowski =

Former Polish noble family

Gutowski (feminine Gutowska) is a Polish surname. There are altered names due to immigration to other countries. It is a surname of Polish szlachta nobility and is one of the oldest recorded names of Polish nobility. The first surviving record is in 1241 as the Chancellor of Poland, Wawrzęta Gutowski.

== Notables ==
- Ace Gutowsky (1909–1976), American football fullback
- Adam Gutowski (1995-), Polish Brit serving as a Police Officer in Wiltshire
- Adalbert Gutowski (1753–1812), Austrian painter
- Antoni Gutowski (1775-?), Castle Burggrave of Grabowiec
- Bob Gutowski (1935–1960), US - Polish American pole vaulter
- Boleslaw Gutowski (*1888 † 1966), Polish doctor/physiologist, professor/dean at the Royal (Dick) Veterinary College in Edinburgh[
- Eva Gutowski (1994-), American YouTube influencer, actress, DJ, and music artist
- Gene Gutowski (1925–2016), Polish-born European and U.S. motion picture and theater producer, noted sculptor and author. Producer of several of Roman Polanski's early films. Co-producer of The Pianist
- Herbert S. Gutowsky (1919–2000), US-American chemist
- Ignaz von Gutowski (1816-1881), 1861 Prussian politician, member of the Prussian Parliament
- Jacek Gutowski (1960–1996), Polish weightlifter
- Jakob Gutowski (unknown), 1733 to 1737, Burggrave of Rozan and Makow Mazowiecki
- Jerzy Marian Gutowski (1954-), Polish entomologist and professor
- Julian Gutowski (1823–1890), member of Parliament (1861–1865) in Austria, from 1867 to 1870 mayor of Nowy Sacz / Neu Sandenz
- Krystyna Gutowska (1947-), Polish philosopher
- Maciej Gutowski (1931–1998), Polish art historian
- Małgorzata Gutowska-Adamczyk, (1958-) Polish author, historian, screenwriter, journalist
- Mateusz Gutowski (1759–1804), Polish Catholic canon (lat. clerici canonici)
- Michał Gutowski (1910–2006), Polish brigadier general, sportsman
- Prokop Gutowski (unknown), 1681 Polish Catholic, cathedral canon (lat. clerici canonici)
- Robert Gutowski Jr (born 1981), philosopher, historian, polymath
- Samuel Gutowski (Unknown), from 1607 to 1620 governor of Radom - District, from 1623 - royal court official
- Simon Gutowski (1627–1685), Polish organ builder, composer and capellmeister of the Tsar of Russia
- Teofil Gutowski (1835–1891), Polish organist and composer
- Walerian Gutowski (1629–1693), Polish provincial superior and royal preacher of the Franciscan Order
- Wawrzęta Gutowski (unknown), Chancellor of Poland 1241–1243
- Wawrzyniec Gutowski (1757–1833), Polish Catholic, canon of the cathedral and bishop
- Wojciech Gutowski (unknown), 1784-1788 Burggrave of Plock
- Wojciech Gutowski (unknown), Leszczyc Clan, 1723 Burggrave of Ostrow
