= Tekla Justyna Chopin =

Mother of Frédéric Chopin

Justyna Krzyżanowska
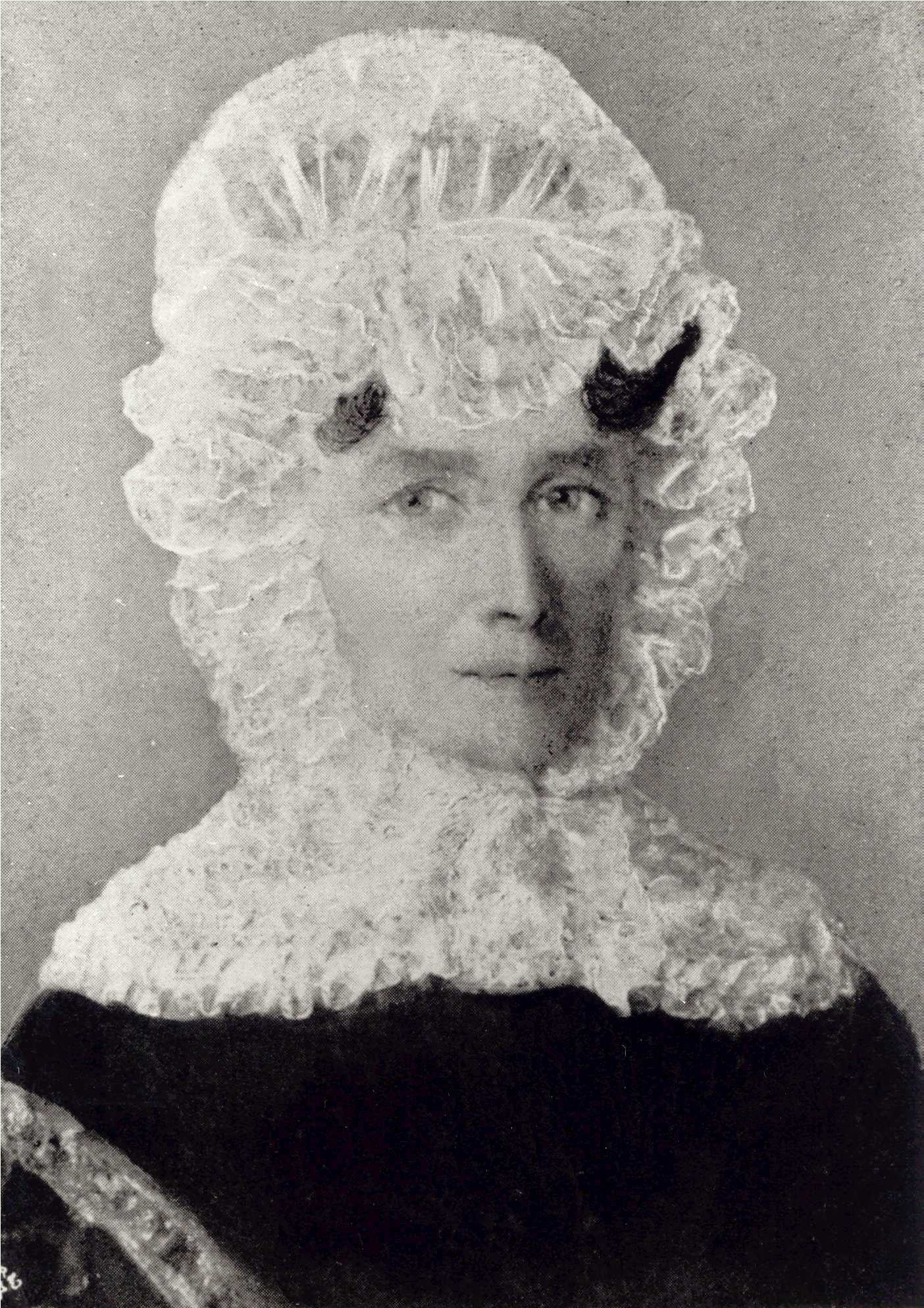
- Born: Tekla Justyna Krzyżanowska; 14 September 1782; Długie, Brześć Kujawski Voivodeship, Polish–Lithuanian Commonwealth (in modern Kuyavian-Pomeranian Voivodeship, Poland)
- Died: 1 October 1861 (aged 79); Warsaw, Congress Poland
- Other name: Justyna Chopin
- Spouse: Nicolas Chopin (m. 1806)
- Children: Ludwika; Frédéric; Izabela; Emilia
- Father: Jakub Krzyżanowski

Justyna Krzyżanowska ([juˈstɨ.na kʂɨ.ʐaˈnɔf.ska]; c. 14 September 1782 – 1 October 1861) was a Polish nanny, amateur musician, and pianist who became the first music teacher of her son, the pianist and composer Frédéric Chopin. She later ran a boarding house for students who attended the Warsaw Lyceum.

== Early life ==
Tekla Justyna Krzyżanowska was christened on 14 September 1782 in the parish church of Izbica Kujawska, in the Polish-Lithuanian Commonwealth, to Antonina (née) Kołomińska and Jakub Krzyżanowski. According to author Piotr Mysłakowski, more than likely she was born a few days prior to her christening on the Skarbek family estate in Długie. Her father had previously been the administrator of the Skarbek estate in Izbica, but, at the time his daughter was born, he was a lessee on their Długie estate. Both of her parents were from the noble class, and she had two older siblings. Little is known of her early life, but in 1800 the Skarbek estate was sold, and the owners moved to Żelazowa Wola in the Duchy of Warsaw. Krzyżanowska may have moved with her parents at this time to Świętosławice and joined the Skarbek family after her father's death in 1805, or she may have gone with the family when they moved.

== Career ==
By 1806, Krzyżanowska was employed as a housekeeper and nanny by Countess Ludwika Skarbek, who also had employed since 1802 Nicolas Chopin as a tutor for the children. Krzyżanowska also served as a healer in the nearby village. The countess played matchmaker for the couple, and, within a year of their meeting, they married at the Saint Roch parish church on 28 June 1806 in Brochów. The countess allowed them to live in a small separate dwelling on her estate. Both Krzyżanowska and Chopin were amateur musicians, and they often entertained the countess' guests with concerts. Chopin played the violin and flute, and Krzyżanowska played the piano and sang. Between 1806 and 1810, the countess moved fairly often between Żelazowa Wola and Warsaw and was accompanied by the Chopins. On 6 April 1807 in Warsaw, their first child, a daughter, Ludwika was born. By 1810, they were back in Żelazowa Wola, where Krzyżanowska gave birth to their only son, Frédéric.

In 1811, Chopin was offered a position to temporarily replace the ailing French teacher at the Warsaw Lyceum. The family permanently settled in Warsaw, where their two other daughters, Izabela and Emilia, were born. They first lived in an apartment provided to faculty for the lyceum in the Saxon Palace. To supplement the family income, they took in students as boarders. Krzyżanowska was responsible for the running of the household, and they continued to host musical evenings. From a young age, Ludwika began her schooling and was taught to play the piano by her mother. She began to teach Frédéric to read and write and taught basic piano skills to her younger brother as part of a teaching game. By 4, he had surpassed her knowledge, and Krzyżanowska began teaching him. By the time he was 7 years old, Frédéric's talent was apparent, he had surpassed what his mother could teach him, and a tutor was hired.

In 1817, the family left their apartment in Saxon Palace and moved to faculty housing for the lyceum in the Kazimierz Palace, where they remained for a decade. In 1827, they moved again, settling in the Palace of Wincenty Krasiński, which now houses the Warsaw Academy of Fine Arts. With each move, Krzyżanowska oversaw the living quarters, nutrition needs, and moral education of both the boarders and her own children. Shortly before Chopin's death in 1844, the couple moved in with their daughter Izabela, who had married Antoni Barciński, with whom Krzyżanowska would live for the rest of her life.

== Death and legacy ==
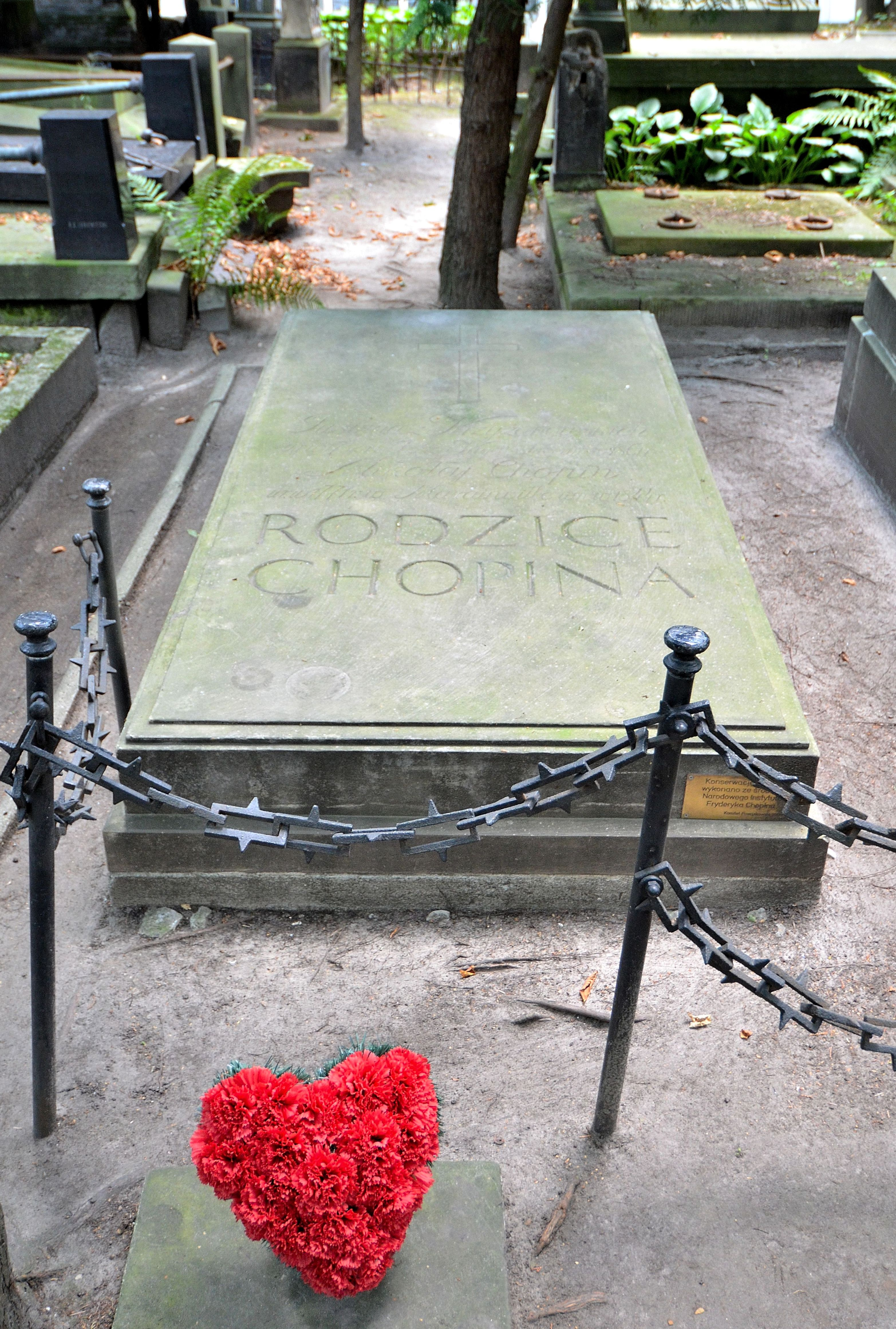
Grave of Chopin's parents.

Krzyżanowska died on 1 October 1861 at an apartment in the Zamoyski Palace in Warsaw. She was buried with her husband's remains in the Powązki Cemetery. They were exhumed in 1948, after the Warsaw Uprising destroyed the cemetery, and reinterred in the Church of St. Charles Borromeo.
