= Kuyavian long barrows =

Enormous tombs, megalithic structures in Kuyavia, Poland

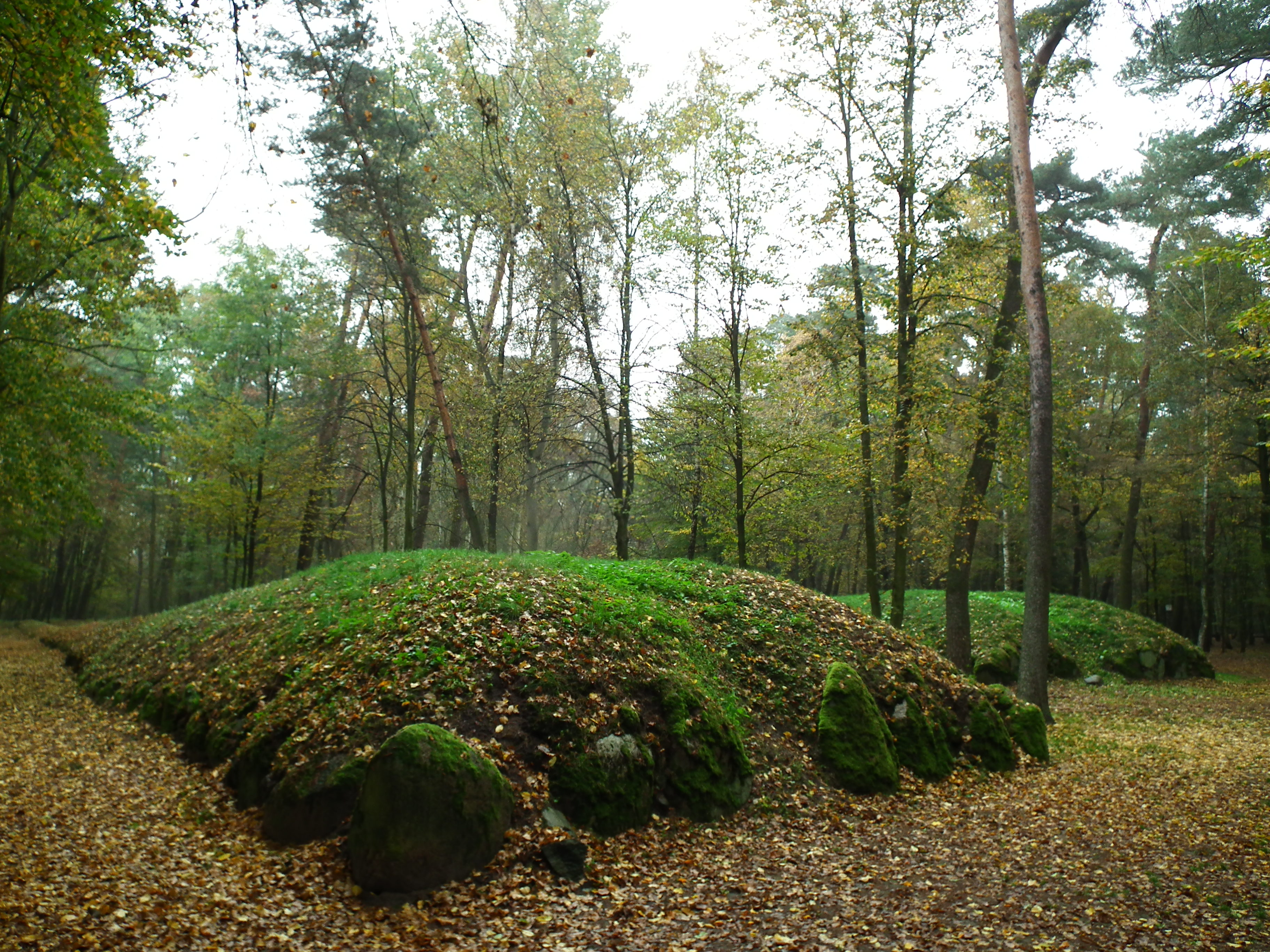
Earthen long barrows in Wietrzychowice, Kuyavian-Pomeranian Voivodeship

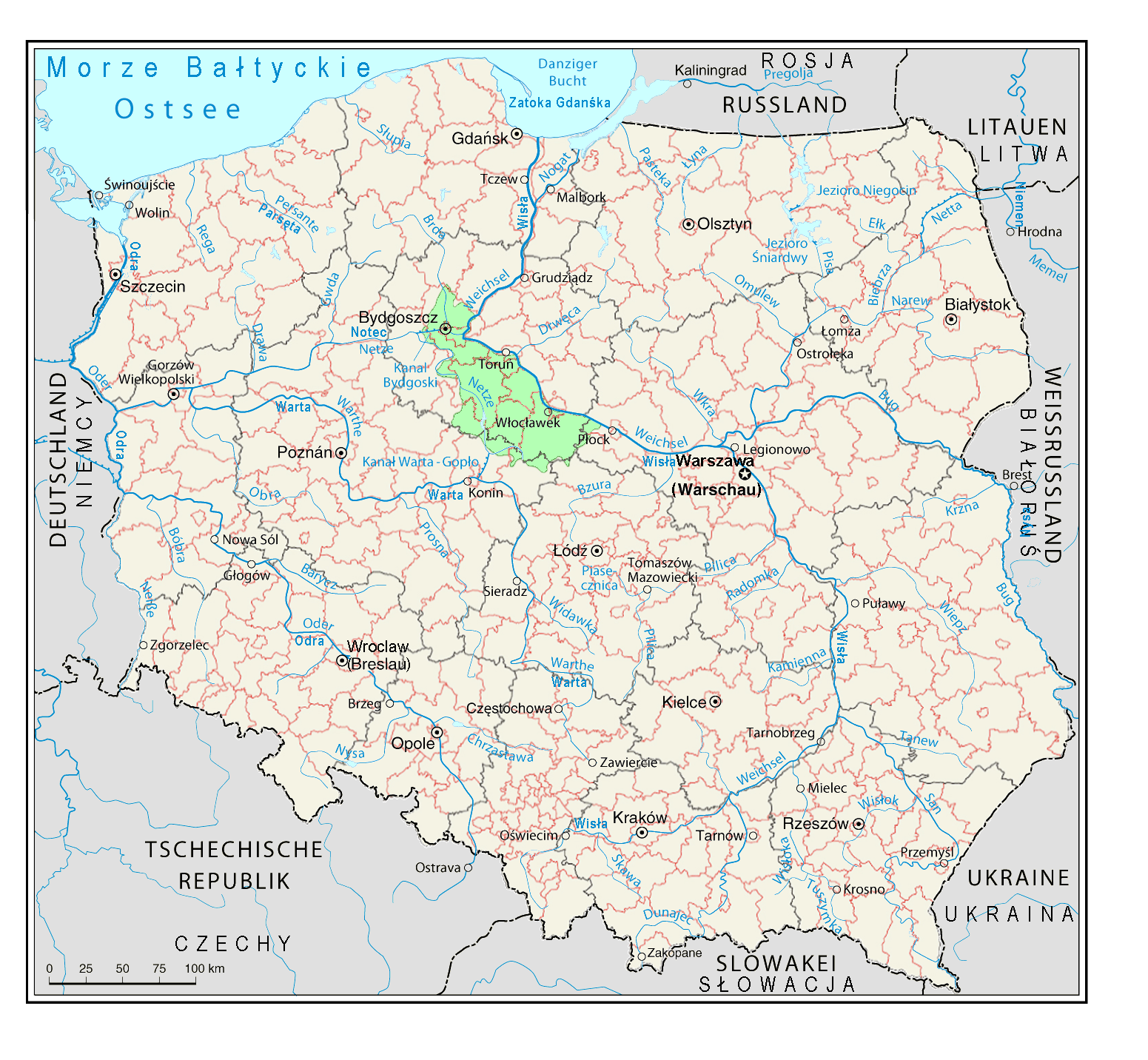
Kuyavia on the map of modern Poland

Kuyavian Pyramids (Polish: Piramidy kujawskie), known as Kuyavian Mounds (Kopce kujawskie), Graves of Giants (groby olbrzymów) or Polish Pyramids are enormous tombs, megalithic structures in Kuyavia, Poland. They were built in the late stages of the Younger Stone Age (ca. 3000–2200 BC), over a period of no more than 500 years. They demonstrate a relatively high level of architectural knowledge, the ability to use simple devices such as levers, and good organization of their builders' work. The orientation of the graves relative to the cardinal directions (east-west) indicates knowledge of certain basic astronomy.

In Poland, outside Eastern Kuyavia, they occur in Western Pomerania. These structures are elongated trapezoidal in shape, less frequently circular.

Two tomb clusters are located near Izbica Kujawska – currently archaeological reserves in Wietrzychowice and Sarnowo, Gmina Lubraniec. Individual tombs have survived in the villages of Gaj Stolarski and Obałki. Until the 1920s, they survived in the village of Śmieły and on the border of Wietrzychowice and Osiecz Mały. Oskar Kolberg reported that tombs were still very numerous in Kuyavia in the 19th century.

The stone enclosure of the grave likely reflects the shape of the large houses of the first farmers of this region, dating from around 4300–3000 BC, belonging to the Kultura polgarska (Danubian culture) or Funnelbeaker culture. Some of the individual boulders forming the eastern wall weigh up to several tons. Their size gradually decreases as the grave narrows westward. The entire structure may have been up to 100 meters long, and the base (eastern wall) 8–10 meters wide. At the top of the grave, in a designated rectangle and in a special pit, was the skeletal burial of one person (presumably the leader – the patriarch of the family), surrounded by stones in a mound. The entire enclosure was covered by a stone and earth mantle up to 4 meters high. It is estimated that the construction of an average-sized structure of this type required up to 600 tons of earth and over 200 tons of stone. In the 1970s, Instytut Archeologii i Etnologii Polskiej Akademii Nauk from Poznań, represented by Prof. T. Wiślański, conducted a series of archaeological works, examining, among others, two megalithic graves located next to each other, situated at the present border of the Pomietów and Karsko, Pyrzyce County fields, and others located in the Krępcewo fields and near Dolice.

== See also ==
- Prehistory and protohistory of Poland
- Stone Age Poland
- Megalith
- Bodzia Cemetery, large 10th century chamber burial site in Bodzia, Włocławek County, Kuyavian-Pomeranian Voivodeship
