= Józef Krupiński =

Polish poet (1930–1998)

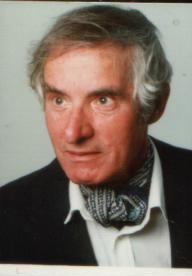
- Born: September 24, 1930; Skarbanowo, Poland
- Died: September 1, 1998 (aged 67); Orzesze, Poland
- Occupation: Poet
- Writing career
- Language: Polish
- Genre: Poetry

Józef Krupiński (September 24, 1930 – September 1, 1998) was a Polish poet. He spent the last days of his life in Orzesze, Poland. Prizewinner of the Edward Stachura Award and member of the Association of Polish Writers in Katowice.

From 1969 he published his works in literacy periodicals such as "Akant", "Poezja", "Miesięcznik Literacki" or "Życie Literackie". His most important collections are "Marsz żałobny", "Z pokładów serca", "Mój pogrzeb pierwszy".

His works express longing of a miner for a landscape of Kujawy.

== Volumes of verse ==
- Kwiaty kujawskie - Kuyavian flowers (1981)
- Marsz żałobny - Funeral march (1985)
- Tratwa Świętej Barbary - Saint Barbara's raft (1986)
- Mój pogrzeb pierwszy - My first funeral (1987)
- Z pokładów serca - From heart-seams (1992)
