= Stone Age Poland =

The Stone Age in the territory of present-day Poland is divided into the Paleolithic, Mesolithic, and Neolithic eras. The Paleolithic extended from about 500,000 BCE to 8000 BCE. The Paleolithic is subdivided into periods, the Lower Paleolithic, 500,000 to 350,000 BCE, the Middle Paleolithic, 350,000 to 40,000 BCE, the Upper Paleolithic, 40,000 to 10,000 BCE, and the Final Paleolithic, 10,000 to 8000 BCE. The Mesolithic lasted from 8000 to 5500 BCE, and the Neolithic from 5500 to 2300 BCE. The Neolithic is subdivided into the Neolithic proper, 5500 to 2900 BCE, and the Copper Age, 2900 to 2300 BCE.

The Stone Age era lasted 800,000 years, and involved three different Homo species: Homo erectus, Homo neanderthalensis and Homo sapiens. The Stone Age cultures ranged from early human groups with primitive tools to advanced agricultural societies, which used sophisticated stone tools, built fortified settlements and developed copper metallurgy. As elsewhere in eastern and central Europe, the Stone Age human cultures went through the stages known as the Paleolithic, Mesolithic and Neolithic, each bringing new refinements of the stone tool making techniques. The Paleolithic period Homo activities (the earliest sites are about 500,000 years old) were intermittent because of the recurring periods of glaciation. With the recession of the last glaciation, a general climate warming and the resulting increase in ecologic environment diversity was characteristic of the Mesolithic (from 9000-8000 BCE). The Neolithic brought the first settled agricultural communities; their founders migrated from the Danube River area (from 5500 BCE). Later the native post-Mesolithic populations also adopted and further developed the agricultural way of life (from 4400 to about 2000 BCE).

== Paleolithic ==
=== Glaciation ===
The Pleistocene colder (glacial) and warmer (interglacial) periods in Poland began with the South Poland glaciation (San River glaciation, until 450,000 BCE), followed by the Masovian interglacial (450,000-370,000 BCE), the Middle Poland glaciation (370,000-128,000 BCE), the Eemian interglacial (128,000-115,000 BCE), and the Vistula glaciation (115,000-10,000 BCE).

=== Homo heidelbergensis ===
Finds in the Tunel Wielki cave suggest the remnants of Homo heidelbergensis dated by 450,000-550,000 BP.

=== Homo erectus ===
Homo erectus settlements on Polish lands occurred later than in the more climatically hospitable regions of southern and western Europe and were dependent on the recurring episodes of glaciation. Gatherer-hunter Homo erectus campsites, together with their inhabitants' primitive stone tools (choppers and microliths), bones of the large mammals they hunted and the fish they caught, were found below the San River glaciation period sediments in Trzebnica and are about 500,000 years old. Younger sites related to the same species were found at Rusko near Strzegom, located, like Trzebnica, in the Lower Silesia region. This represents the microlithic complexes of the Lower Paleolithic period. Homo erectus, earlier known as Pithecanthropus erectus, was a species of early humans.

=== Homo neanderthalensis ===
Now often also considered a distinct species, Homo neanderthalensis lived in the southern half of Poland during the Middle Paleolithic period, that is between 300,000 and 40,000 BCE. Various relics were found and different Neanderthal cultures are distinguished. Acheulean handaxes from Silesia dated 200,000-180,000 years ago are among the older tools. Gatherer-hunter sporadic groups of Neanderthals penetrated southern Poland also during the Eemian interglacial, 128,000-115,000 BCE. Examination of the Micoquien-Prądnik culture (East Micoquien complex) sites in the Prądnik River Valley north of Kraków and in Zwoleń near Radom from about 85,000 to 70,000 BCE (early phase of the Vistula River glaciation period) shows that some Neanderthals were skilled collective hunters, able to kill numerous large mammals characteristic of the cold Pleistocene climate and process the meat, skin and bones using specialized tools.

=== Homo sapiens ===
Homo sapiens proper (Homo sapiens, the Cro-Magnon type) appears in the Upper Paleolithic, which lasted from 40,000 to 9,000 BCE.^{[a]} During the coldest part of this Ice age period, 20,000 to 15,000 BCE, humans did not inhabit Poland. The latter, warmer part, after the climatic discontinuity and the reappearance of humans, is considered the Late Paleolithic.^{[b]}

Upper Paleolithic people specialized in organized, group hunting of large mammals; they sometimes pursued and drove entire herds into traps. Their nutritional needs were met largely by meat consumption, as the vegetation was limited to tundra and steppe and the land was covered by ice and snow (Vistula final glaciation) for long periods. More sophisticated tool making methods resulted in the production of long (some over two feet), narrow and sharp flintstone splits. In a cave near Nowy Targ (East-Gravettian culture), a 30,000-year-old boomerang, the world's oldest, was found. It is a crescent-shaped 70 cm long object with a fine finish, made of mammoth tusk. Mammoths were hunted in the Kraków area during 25,000-20,000 BCE. Also 30,000 years old are the so-called Mladeč-type blades of the Aurignacian culture, made of bone, found in Wierzchowie, Kraków County.

A 27,500-year old burial of an 18-month old child, complete with burial gift decorative artifacts, pendant or necklace elements made of teeth of large ungulates, was discovered in Borsuk Cave near Kraków (southern Kraków-Częstochowa Upland). It is believed to be the oldest intentional burial located in Poland.

Rydno is a complex of archeological sites along the Kamiennna River valley between Skarżysko-Kamienna and Wąchock. Several hundred Paleolithic campsites have been located there, which makes it the world's largest accumulation of such finds. They extend over a number of periods, beginning with the Mousterian (Neanderthal) culture, followed by the Hamburg culture of reindeer hunters. The Final Paleolithic is represented there by the Komornica culture, named after a village in Legionowo County. The best known Late Paleolithic campsites in the area, which include some dugout huts, belonged to the people preoccupied with hematite ore mining, from which ochre pigment used for body painting was being made. The red dye was widely traded, which is why rocks and minerals originating from distant regions of today's Poland, Slovakia and Hungary are found at Rydno. Pieces of "chocolate" flint brought into this area for processing were stored in quantities that were always multiples of three. Because of this and other evidence, it is believed that the Paleolithic people developed a counting system based on this number. A 12,600 BCE Hamburg culture site with tents, camp-fire and stone meat baking devices was discovered in Olbrachcice, Wschowa County.

A rich source of Late Paleolithic sites and artifacts (the Magdalenian culture of 14,500 BCE) is the Prądnik River Valley. The Maszycka Cave there contained the remains of a typical (at that time) social unit of several families, 20-30 people, as well as numerous tools and other artifacts of their culture, including ornamented bone utensils. Remnants of a 15,000 to 17,000 years old Magdalenian culture dwelling (a dugout cabin site with traces of supporting posts, a hearth and imported materials) were discovered recently in Ćmielów, Ostrowiec Świętokrzyski County. Traces of younger (Final Paleolithic) campsites identified with the Swiderian, Federmesser and Ahrenburgian cultures were located at Stare Marzy near Świecie, among other places.

== Mesolithic ==
The Mesolithic lasted from 9000 BCE (rapid climate warming) to 5500 BCE (arrival of first farmers from the Danube River area). It was the last period when the food production economy was entirely opportunistic, based on assimilation of plant and animal material found in nature, that is gathering and hunting. Because of warmer temperatures, complex forest ecosystems and wetlands developed and this natural diversity necessitated new hunting and fishing strategies. As new populations entered Poland from the west, hunters and fishermen working individually or in small groups had to pursue single large and small animals using traps, javelins, bows and arrows, boats and fishing equipment, and utilizing dogs. Women engaged in gathering of such products as roots, herbs, nuts, bird eggs, mollusks, fruit or honey, which possibly was even more important than hunting. Mesolithic human settlements became quite numerous and by the end of this period the economy of harvesting nature became very highly developed. Tools and devices were made of materials such as stone (flint strip mines have been found at the northern edge of Świętokrzyskie Mountains), bone, wood, horn, or plant material for rope and baskets, and included such fine utensils as fishing hooks and sewing needles. Animal figurines were made of amber. At least during the later Mesolithic, the dead were placed in graves and outfitted with familiar objects of their surroundings. One such well preserved grave of an apparent tool-maker, together with his tools and other items, was found in Janisławice near Skierniewice and dated 5500 BCE.

== Neolithic ==
=== Introduction of agriculture - Danubian cultures of farming communities ===
Early Neolithic era began around 5500 BCE with the arrival from the middle Danube area of people, who kept livestock, cultivated crops, made pottery and smooth-surface tools. Their land tilling predecessors had been coming into the Balkans and then the Danube region from Anatolia beginning a thousand years earlier. They formed the first settled rural communities, thus forging the most fundamental civilizational advance.

The original newcomers represented the Linear Pottery culture. Their uniform culture survived in Poland in its original form until about 4600 BCE. Despite the big impact they made, the first waves came in small numbers - hundreds, or at most a few thousand people, judging by the sizes of the known settlements. They populated mainly fertile soils of southern highlands and river valleys further north, all the way to the Baltic Sea. They lived alongside the more numerous native people who were still pursuing the Mesolithic lifestyle, but during the Linear Pottery culture times there wasn't much interaction, as the two groups inhabited different environments. Their villages consisted of several, but sometimes up to a dozen or so rectangular communal long-houses, some over 30 meters long, supported by wooden posts, the oldest of which come from the Lower Silesia region. One such location from about 5000 BCE was also unearthed at Olszanica, which is now at the west end of Kraków just within the city limits.

Large Danubian complexes were in recent years excavated in the Targowisko and Szarów (Wieliczka County) area of fertile loessial hills. The settlements, which included massive post construction houses even over 50 meters long as well as industrial facilities, extended continuously over a stretch of land more than three kilometers long. Some of the identified structures functioned together, as was the case when the buildings were connected by a courtyard and protected by a common fence.

Plants were cultivated mostly in small nearby gardens, but wheat and barley were also grown on small fields obtained by burning the forest. In the absence of animal-drawn plowing devices, soil was being hoed manually. The forest burning activity brought about significant ecological and environmental changes in Lesser Poland, Silesia and Kujawy. Further out were the pastures, the entire area utilized by a single settlement having a radius of about 5 km. Cattle, sheep and goats were even more numerous in the northern flatlands, where the land was less fertile. The Danubian people communities kept in touch and exchanged goods over large areas, all the way to their regions of origin beyond the Carpathian Mountains.

After 5000 BCE new waves of immigrants arrived from the south again, which accelerated the process of differentiation of the agrarian society into several distinct cultures during the first half of 5th millennium BC and afterwards. In the Oder River basin mostly there was the culture named after the punctured variety of Linear Band pottery - Stroked Pottery culture, while in the Vistula River basin the Lengyel and Polgár cultures appeared. The two regions developed in some separation, but within them the different cultural traditions of the younger Danubian circle often overlapped. The houses were now of an elongated trapezoidal shape, up to 40 meters long, grouped in larger complexes, often protected by beam and earth walls, moats and other fortifications, as such defensive measures apparently became necessary against people from the still Mesolithic native population or other Danubian settlements. These defensive structures, built from the mid 5th millennium BCE on, were complicated and consumed significant time and resources. Their design followed that of the similar construction that was taking place in the Danube River areas, starting in the early part of this millennium. Large cemeteries and graves supplied with fancier objects such as jewelry, including the first so-called "princely" graves (the princesses had imported copper necklaces, earrings and diadems in addition to locally made decorations), testify to the emergence of a relatively more affluent society. Cattle raising and trading (large varieties resulted from cross-breeding with the aurochs) and land tillage provided basic sustenance. Salt was obtained and traded and became a much sought after commodity, at first probably to help preserve stored food. The salt springs around Wieliczka were utilized already by the Lengyel culture people, who left ceramic vessels used in salt production there. The Danubian people produced many richly decorated objects, including clay containers with animal head ornaments and figurines of women.

A settlement and cemetery of the Lengyel-Polgár cultural zone, dated around or after 4600 BCE, was discovered in Ślęza, Wrocław County. It consisted of a central long trapezoidal house accompanied by several post-built supporting structures. Among the large explored settlements of the Lengyel culture from the 4400-4000 BCE period, there is one in Brześć Kujawski, and another one in Osłonki, solidly fortified about 4200 BCE after an assault incident involving arson and murder, both located in the Kujawy region. At the Osłonki settlement nearly 30 trapezoidal houses and over 80 graves were located, some of them with many copper ornaments. The agricultural and construction activities of the communities centered on the two large settlements (hunting and fishing were also practiced) caused very likely an accumulation of environmental damage, which eventually forced them to abandon the area. 4th millennium BC constructions reinforced with ditches and palisades and ceramics molded into figural representations of the Lengyel-Polgár culture were located in Podłęże, Wieliczka County.

The Malice farming culture of southern Poland (all of 5th millennium and until 3800 BCE, named after a site in Malice near Sandomierz) was the first Neolithic culture to originate north of the Carpathian Mountains and spread south. A rare discovery of 5th millennium Malice culture buildings and decorated pottery was made in Targowisko, Wieliczka County.

=== Neolithic cultures developed by native populations ===
After 4500 BCE the Ertebølle culture of northwestern origin entered a ceramic phase with its own forms of pottery (characteristic pointed bottoms). They lived by the Baltic Sea shores and were specialized in utilizing the resources of the sea, thus still representing the Mesolithic ways of life. At their settlement in Dąbki near Koszalin Stroke-ornamented pottery was found, obtained probably through trade with the Danubian people.

The native Mesolithic populations were slow in gradually assimilating the agricultural way of life, beginning with just the use of ceramics. It took a thousand years into the Neolithic period before they adopted animal husbandry (which became especially important to them) and plant cultivation to any appreciable degree. When they eventually developed interest in the more fertile areas utilized by the late Danubian cultures, they became the threat that compelled the Danubian farmers to fortify their settlements. The native post-Mesolithic groups expanded beyond the traditional Danubian areas of agricultural development, moving also into ecologically less favorable environments, which included utilization of sandy soils.

The first truly native Neolithic culture was the Funnelbeaker culture, named after the shape of their typical clay vessels. It developed starting around 4400 BCE and lasted some two thousand years. Like other post-Mesolithic cultures, the Funnelbeaker culture was Megalithic. They built tombs of large stones, some of them huge (for example trapezoidal structures up to 150 meters long) and resembling pyramids. Few survived until now because of the demand for stone as building material, but a well-preserved one from the first half of 4th millennium BC was found in Wietrzychowice in Kuyavian–Pomeranian Voivodeship, so-called Kuyavian Pyramids or Polish Pyramids. From this place and period came the skull, on which the trepanation procedure was performed for medical or magic reasons. Timewise the beginnings of the post-Mesolithic cultures in Poland coincide with the beginnings of the Eneolithic period in the Balkans. Copper objects, mostly ornamental or luxurious items, were traded and then developed locally, first by the Danubian and then by the indigenous people. Copper metallurgy facilities were identified in Złota near Sandomierz. Clay decorative objects include realistic representations of animals and containers with images engraved on them. A pot from Bronocice, Pińczów County (3400 BCE) has a unique narrative scene and the world's oldest semblance of a four-wheeled cart drawn on its surface. Stone tools became most highly developed and acquired their then characteristic smooth surfaces. Well preserved settlements with rectangular buildings were unearthed in Gródek Nadbużny near Hrubieszów (where remnants of a vertical loom for weaving were found), in Niedźwiedź near Kraków, and in northern Poland in Barłożno, Starogard Gdański County, where the structures are similar to the ones in Niedźwiedź. In Barłożno three post supported houses were discovered, the largest of which had the main part 16 meters long and 6.5 meters wide. As dated from the ceramics found, they represent the developed, "Wiórecka" phase of the Funnelbeaker culture.

Originating from central European lowlands, the Funnelbeaker people were able to utilize large expanses of less fertile soils, obtained by extensive reduction of forested areas, with the increased role of livestock. They moved south into the regions previously developed by the Danubian cultures, all the way to Bohemia and Moravia. Being more numerous, better fit for the environment, organized and economically more productive, the Funnelbeaker culture people replaced the Danubian cultures in their late phase.

The Globular Amphora culture was the next major Neolithic culture. It originated in the Polish lowlands during the first half of 4th millennium BC, lasted to about 2400 BCE in parallel with the Funnelbeaker culture, and is named after the bulging shape of its representative pottery. They specialized in breeding domestic animals and lived in a semi-settled state, seeking optimal pastures and moving as needed. This semi-nomadic lifestyle was probably necessitated by the poor condition of the soils, by that time depleted and rendered infertile because of the preceding centuries of forest burning and extensive exploitation. Globular Amphora were the first culture in Poland known for utilizing the domesticated horse, and swine became important as the source of food. Ritual animal, especially cattle burial sites, often with two or more individuals buried together and supplied with objects as strange as drums have been discovered, but their role is not well understood. Globular Amphora people were involved in the north-south amber trade. Their megalithic burials included ceramics, stone tools and ornamental gifts.

The Baden culture in southern Poland was the latest of the Danubian ancestry cultures and continued between 3200 and 2600 BCE. They made vessels with characteristic protruding radial ornaments. A large fortified Baden culture settlement of around 3000 BCE was found in Bronocice near Pińczów.

Finally there were still in existence the forest zone cultures, representing the ceramic phase of hunting and gathering communities. Some of them lasted into the early Bronze Age.

The major industry of this period was flintstone mining. One of the largest Neolithic (middle to late periods) flint mines in Europe with over 700 vertical shafts and preserved underground passages was located in Krzemionki Opatowskie near Ostrowiec Świętokrzyski. The axes produced from the material obtained there were exported to distant parts of the continent.

=== Late Neolithic arrivals from eastern and western regions of Europe ===
The Corded Ware culture, in existence in central Europe between 3000 and 2000 BCE, originated most likely from Proto-Indo-European nomadic people of the Black Sea steppes. It was a pastoral culture at least in its early stages, for the most part lacking permanent settlements and known primarily from the burial grounds (a large one with many richly furnished graves was discovered in Złota near Sandomierz). They moved together with their herds of cattle, sheep, goats and horses along the river valleys of southern Poland, but also engaged in flint mining and manufacturing of tools and weapons for their own use and trade.

A Corded Ware culture princely burial was found in Szczytna, Subcarpathian Voivodeship. The grave, well-secured three meters below the surface, contained a man's skeleton and a funerary gift collection of highly valuable copper decorations, containers, stone tools and arrowheads. The uniquely equipped burial of a warrior-chief has close analogies with finds from Transylvania, a testimony to geographically extensive contacts of Corded Ware culture nomadic people.

The Rzucewo culture (named after the village near Puck where the discoveries took place) developed from northern populations of the Corded Ware culture as an offshoot specialized in exploitation of the sea resources and lasted in parallel with their mother culture for a comparable period of time. Their settlements consisting of characteristic sea erosion reinforced houses were located along the Bay of Gdańsk and east of there. They engaged in fishery and hunting, especially of seals, then numerous along the Baltic coast. The Rzucewo culture people produced in special shops the widely used and traded amber decorative items.

From the opposite end of Europe (the Iberian Peninsula) came the few people who formed during the 2500-1900 BCE period the Bell-Beaker culture. It was named after the shape of their typical, carefully finished and precisely ornamented pottery. Southwestern Poland was at the eastern edge of their range. Because of their mobility, the Bell-Beaker people helped spread new inventions, including developing metallurgy, over large areas of Europe.

== See also ==
- Prehistory of Poland (until 966)
- Bronze and Iron Age Poland
- Poland in Antiquity
- Poland in the Early Middle Ages

== Notes ==
a. According to genetic research, Homo sapiens had not evolved in Europe from earlier forms, but migrated to Europe around 40,000 years ago and later from Asia. See Deep Ancestry: Inside the Genographic Project by Spencer Wells, p. 105-111, 2007 Washington D.C. National Geographic, ISBN 1-4262-0118-4

b. Final Paleolithic terminology also used and the period sometimes given as lasting until 8000 BC, as in Archaeological Motorway by Ryszard Naglik, Archeologia Żywa (Living Archeology), special English issue 2005
