= Cieplinki =

- Village
- Location within Poland
- Coordinates: 52°20′55″N 18°50′3″E
- Country: Poland
- Voivodeship: Kuyavian-Pomeranian
- County: Włocławek
- Gmina: Izbica Kujawska
- Population: 60

Cieplinki [t͡ɕɛˈplinki] is a village in the administrative district of Gmina Izbica Kujawska, within Włocławek County, Kuyavian-Pomeranian Voivodeship, in north-central Poland.
