= Sokołowo, Gmina Izbica Kujawska =

Sokołowo
- Village
- Location within Poland
- Coordinates: 52°25′17″N 18°47′50″E
- Country: Poland
- Voivodeship: Kuyavian-Pomeranian
- County: Włocławek
- Gmina: Izbica Kujawska
- Time zone: UTC+1 (CET)
  - Summer (DST): UTC+2 (CEST)

Sokołowo [sukˈiɔˈdɛ̃k] is a village in the administrative district of Gmina Izbica Kujawska, within Włocławek County, Kuyavian-Pomeranian Voivodeship, in central Poland.
