= Mieczysławowo, Kuyavian-Pomeranian Voivodeship =

Mieczysławowo
- Village
- Location within Poland
- Coordinates: 52°21′23″N 18°47′21″E
- Country: Poland
- Voivodeship: Kuyavian-Pomeranian
- County: Włocławek
- Gmina: Izbica Kujawska
- Population: 45

Mieczysławowo [mjɛt͡ʂɨswaˈvɔvɔ] is a village in the administrative district of Gmina Izbica Kujawska, within Włocławek County, Kuyavian-Pomeranian Voivodeship, in north-central Poland.
