= Gmina Izbica Kujawska =

Gmina Izbica Kujawska Izbica Kujawska Commune
- Gmina
- Coat of arms
- Interactive map of Gmina Izbica Kujawska
- Coordinates (Izbica Kujawska): 52°25′10″N 18°45′37″E
- Country: Poland
- Voivodeship: Kuyavian-Pomeranian
- County: Włocławek County
- Seat: Izbica Kujawska

Area
  - Total: 132.05 km^{2} (50.98 sq mi)

Population (2006)
  - Total: 8,008
  - Density: 60.64/km^{2} (157.1/sq mi)
  - Urban: 2,783
  - Rural: 5,225
- Time zone: UTC+1 (CET)
  - Summer (DST): UTC+2 (CEST)
- Vehicle registration: CWL
- Website: https://web.archive.org/web/20071009083723/http://www.ugim-izbicakuj.pl/

Gmina Izbica Kujawska is an urban-rural gmina (administrative district) in Włocławek County, Kuyavian-Pomeranian Voivodeship, in central Poland. Its seat is the town of Izbica Kujawska, which lies approximately 33 kilometres (21 mi) south-west of Włocławek and 69 km (43 mi) south of Toruń.

The gmina covers an area of 132.05 square kilometres (51.0 sq mi), and as of 2006 its total population is 8,008 (out of which the population of Izbica Kujawska amounts to 2,783, and the population of the rural part of the gmina is 5,225).

== Villages ==
Apart from the town of Izbica Kujawska, Gmina Izbica Kujawska contains the villages and settlements of Augustynowo, Błenna, Błenna A, Błenna B, Chociszewo, Cieplinki, Ciepliny, Ciepliny-Budy, Długie, Gąsiorowo, Grochowiska, Helenowo, Józefowo, Kazanki, Kazimierowo, Komorowo, Mchówek, Mieczysławowo, Modzerowo, Naczachowo, Nowa Wieś, Obałki, Pasieka, Skarbanowo, Ślazewo, Śmielnik, Śmieły, Sokołowo, Świętosławice, Świszewy, Szczkówek, Tymień, Wietrzychowice, Wiszczelice, Wólka Komorowska and Zdzisławin.

== Neighbouring gminas ==
Gmina Izbica Kujawska is bordered by the gminas of Babiak, Boniewo, Lubraniec, Przedecz and Topólka.
