= Gąsiorowo, Kuyavian-Pomeranian Voivodeship =

Gąsiorowo
- Village
- Location within Poland
- Coordinates: 52°22′43″N 18°55′15″E
- Country: Poland
- Voivodeship: Kuyavian-Pomeranian
- County: Włocławek
- Gmina: Izbica Kujawska

Gąsiorowo [ɡɔ̃ɕɔˈrɔvɔ] is a village in the Gmina Izbica Kujawska administrative district in Włocławek County, Kuyavian-Pomeranian Voivodeship, north central Poland.
