= Helenowo, Włocławek County =

Helenowo
- Village
- Location within Poland
- Coordinates: 52°23′13″N 18°51′38″E
- Country: Poland
- Voivodeship: Kuyavian-Pomeranian
- County: Włocławek
- Gmina: Izbica Kujawska

Helenowo [xɛlɛˈnɔvɔ] is a village in the administrative district of Gmina Izbica Kujawska, within Włocławek County, Kuyavian-Pomeranian Voivodeship, in north-central Poland.
