= Sarnowo, Gmina Lubraniec =

Sarnowo
- Village
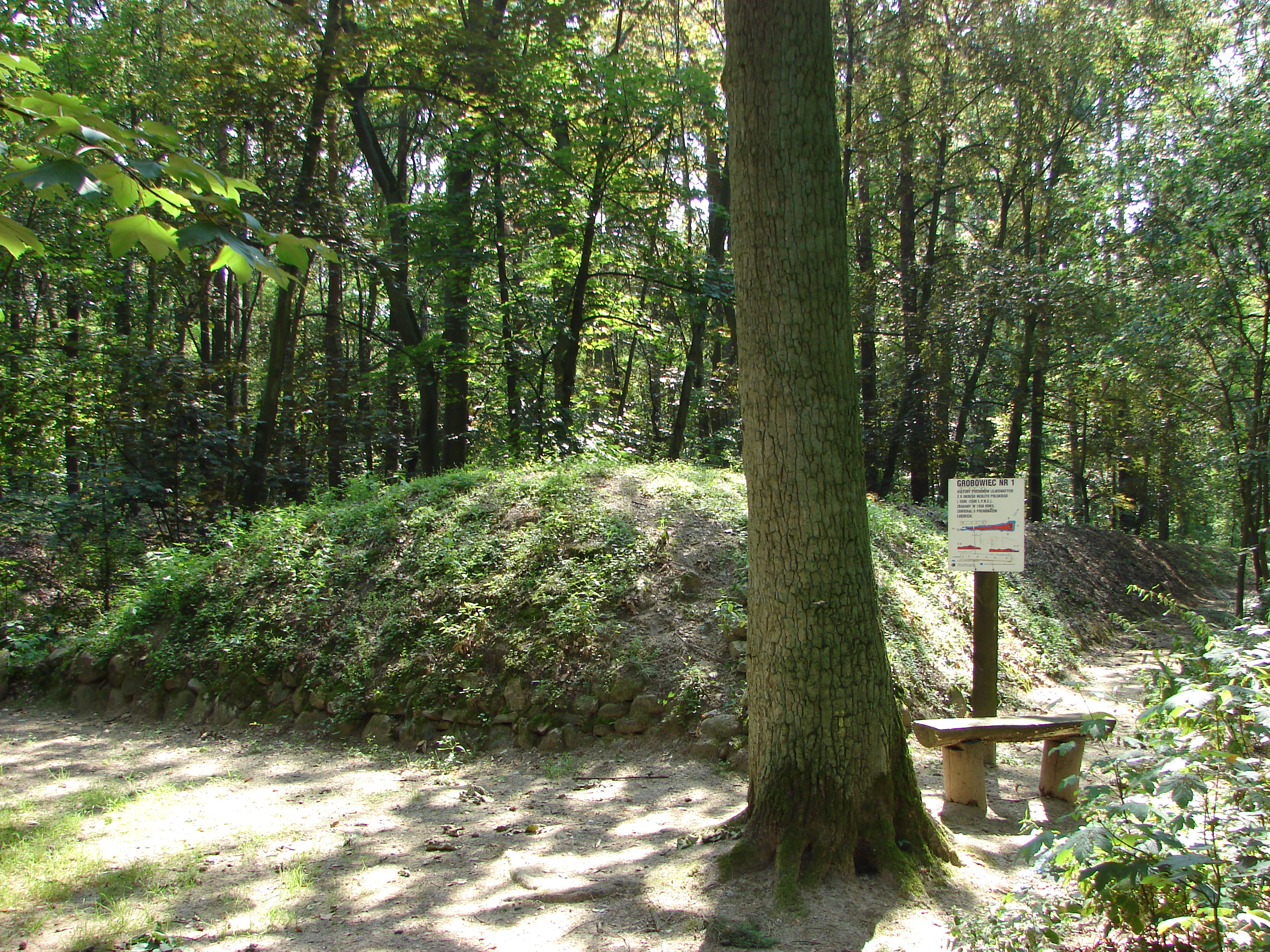
- Tomb number 1

- Location within Poland
- Coordinates: 52°27′58″N 18°45′03″E
- Country: Poland
- Voivodeship: Kuyavian-Pomeranian
- County: Włocławek
- Gmina: Lubraniec
- Time zone: UTC+1 (CET)
  - Summer (DST): UTC+2 (CEST)
- Vehicle registration: CWL

Sarnowo [sarˈnɔvɔ] is a village in the administrative district of Gmina Lubraniec, within Włocławek County, Kuyavian-Pomeranian Voivodeship, in central Poland.

In the forest near the village is a group of 9 megalithic tombs (Kuyavian Pyramids) which were built by people from Funnelbeaker Culture in 4000 years BC.
