= Izbica Kujawska =

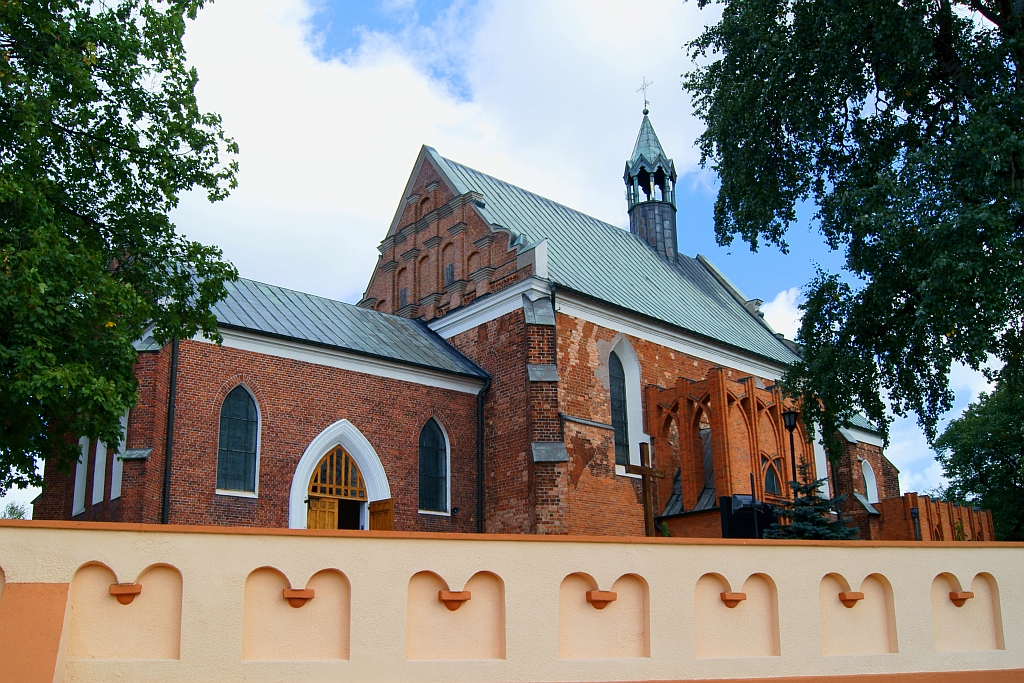
- Catholic church in Izbica Kujawska, oldest part from the 15th century

- Coat of arms

- Location within Poland
- Coordinates: 52°25′10″N 18°45′37″E
- Country: Poland
- Voivodeship: Kuyavian-Pomeranian
- County: Włocławek
- Gmina: Izbica Kujawska
- Established: 11th century
- Town rights: 1394-1870, 1973

Government
  - Mayor: Marek Dorabiała

Area
  - Total: 2.24 km^{2} (0.86 sq mi)

Population (2006)
  - Total: 2,783
  - Density: 1,240/km^{2} (3,220/sq mi)
- Time zone: UTC+1 (CET)
  - Summer (DST): UTC+2 (CEST)
- Postal code: 87-865
- Area code: +48 54
- Vehicle registration: CWL
- Website: http://www.izbica-kujawska.com/

Izbica Kujawska pronounced [izˈbʲit͡sa kuˈjafska] is a town in central Poland with 2,808 inhabitants (2004). It is situated in the Włocławek County in the Kuyavian-Pomeranian Voivodeship, in the historic region of Kuyavia.

== History ==
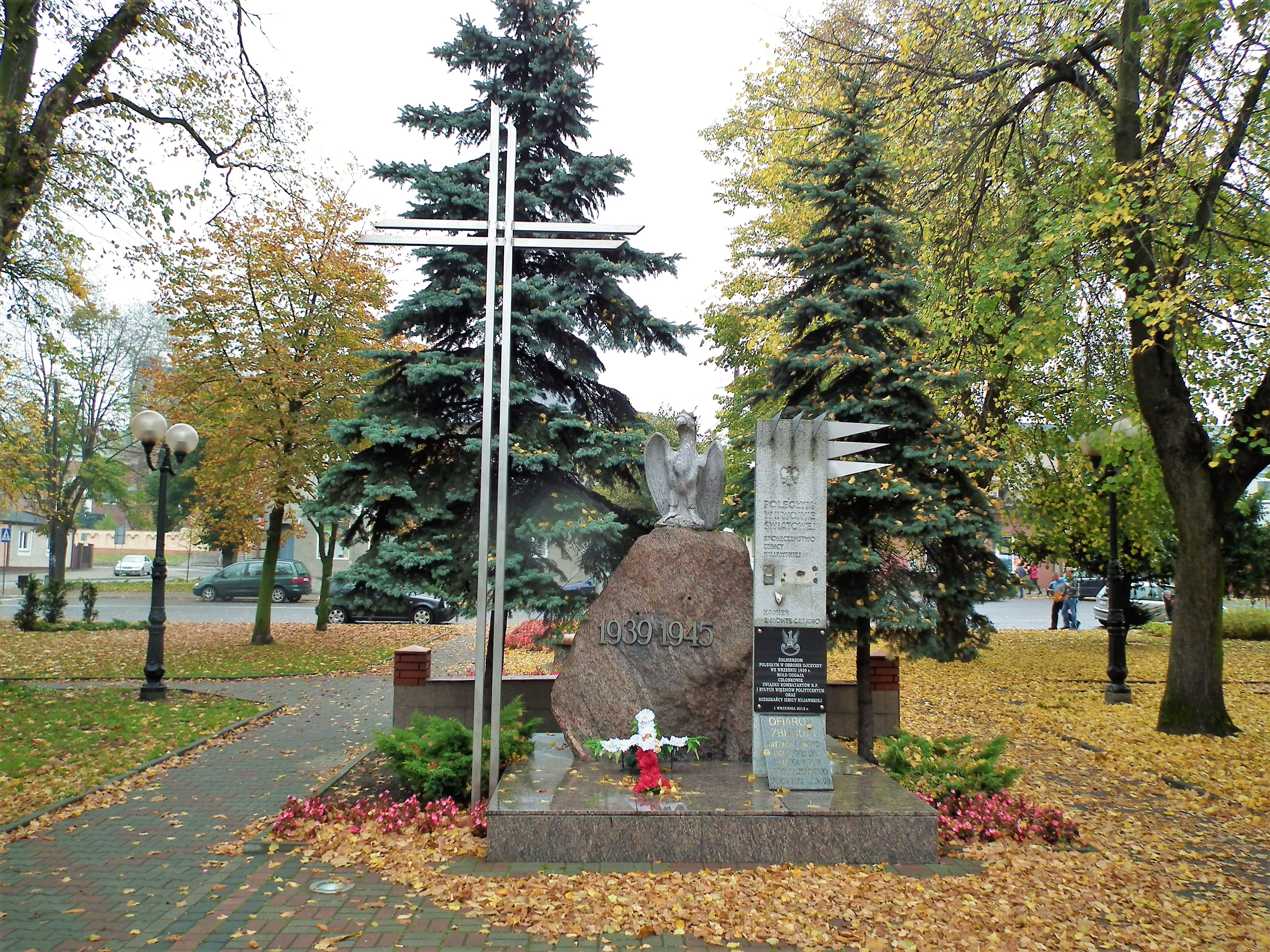
World War II memorial

Izbica was granted town rights in 1394. It was a private town, administratively located in the Przedecz County in the Brześć Kujawski Voivodeship in the Greater Poland Province of the Kingdom of Poland.

Following the joint German-Soviet invasion of Poland, which started World War II in September 1939, the town was occupied by Germany until 1945.

From 1975 to 1998, it was administratively located in the Włocławek Voivodeship.

== Archaeology ==
In the Izbica forest on the way to village Wietrzychowice there's a group of megalithic tombs called Polish Pyramids. They are elongated mounds up to 120 meters in length and a height of 2–3 meters with originally built entrance on one side and more than one grave inside. Built probably around 4000 BC.

The Megalith tombs in Wietrzychowice
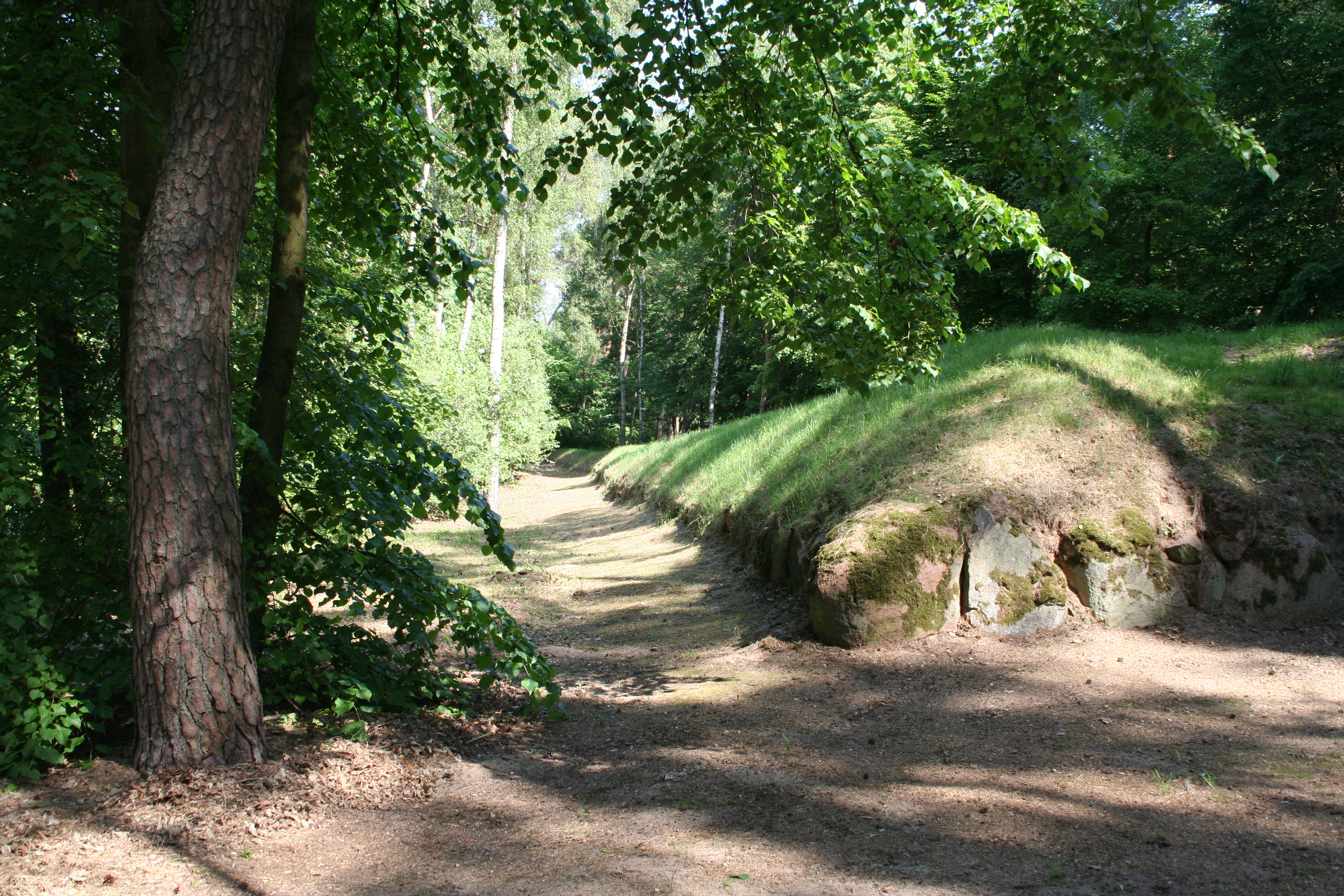
The five-and-a-half-thousand year old Megalith graves containing relics

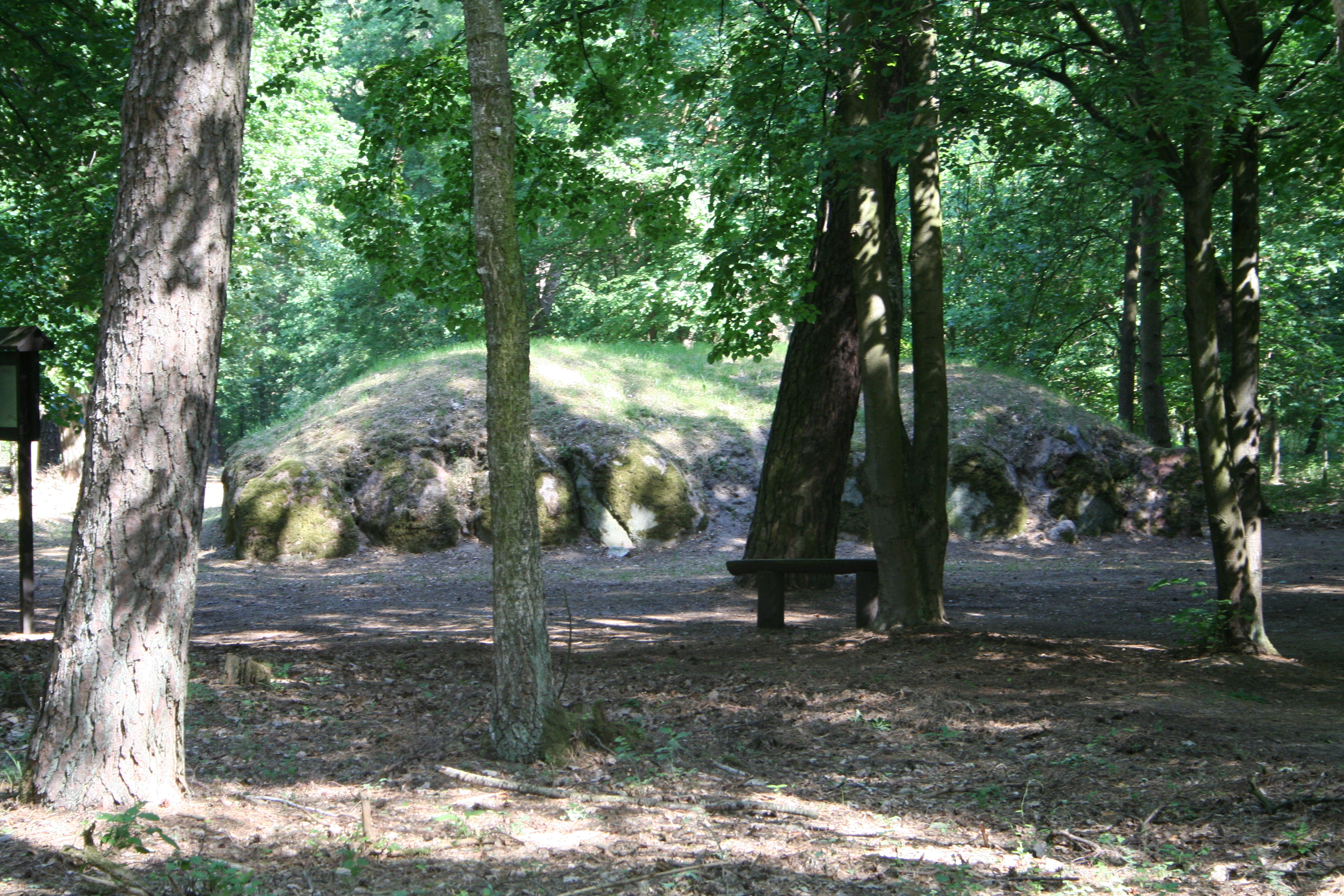
The graves, subject of archeological research
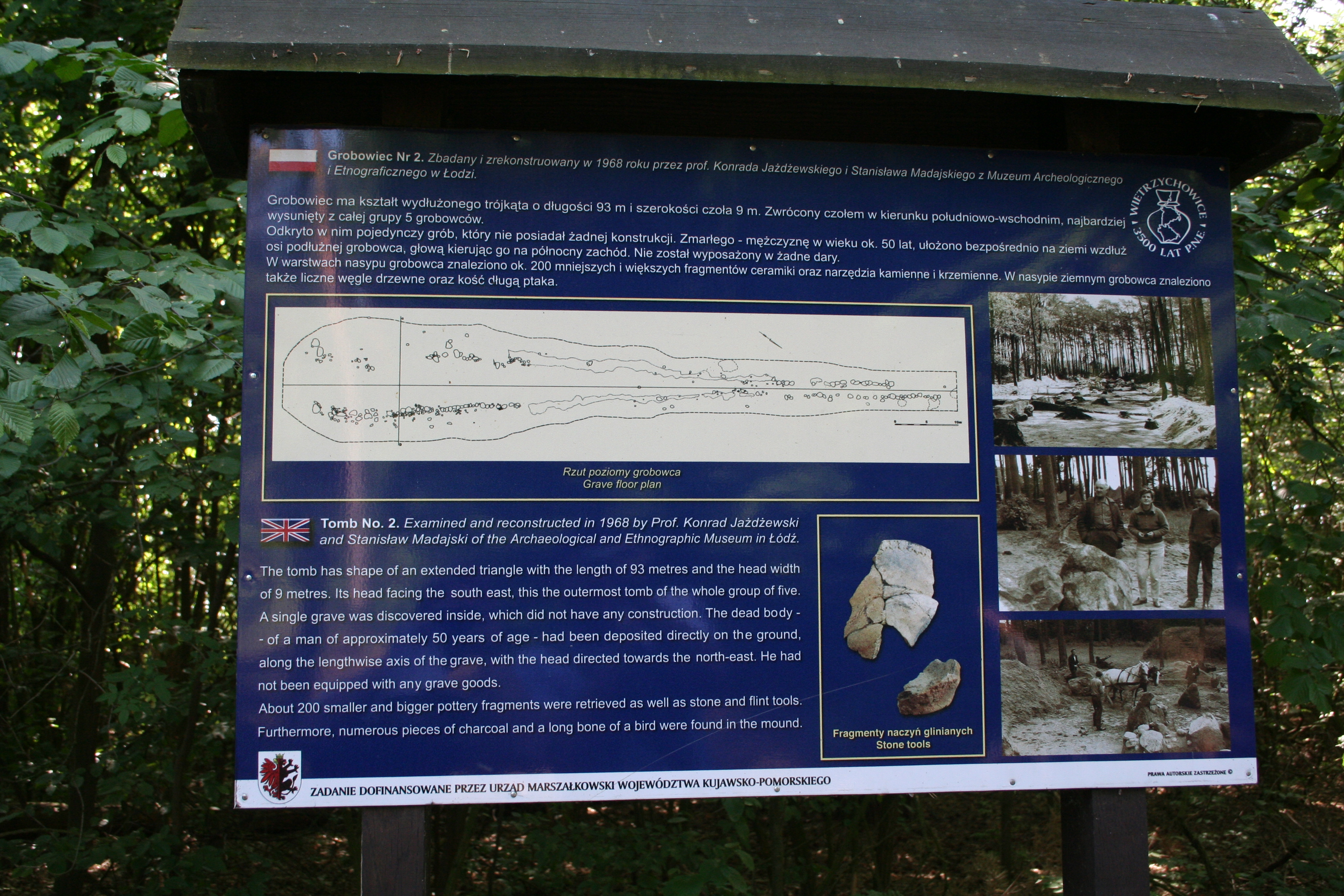
One of several info-boards at the Megalith archeological reservation

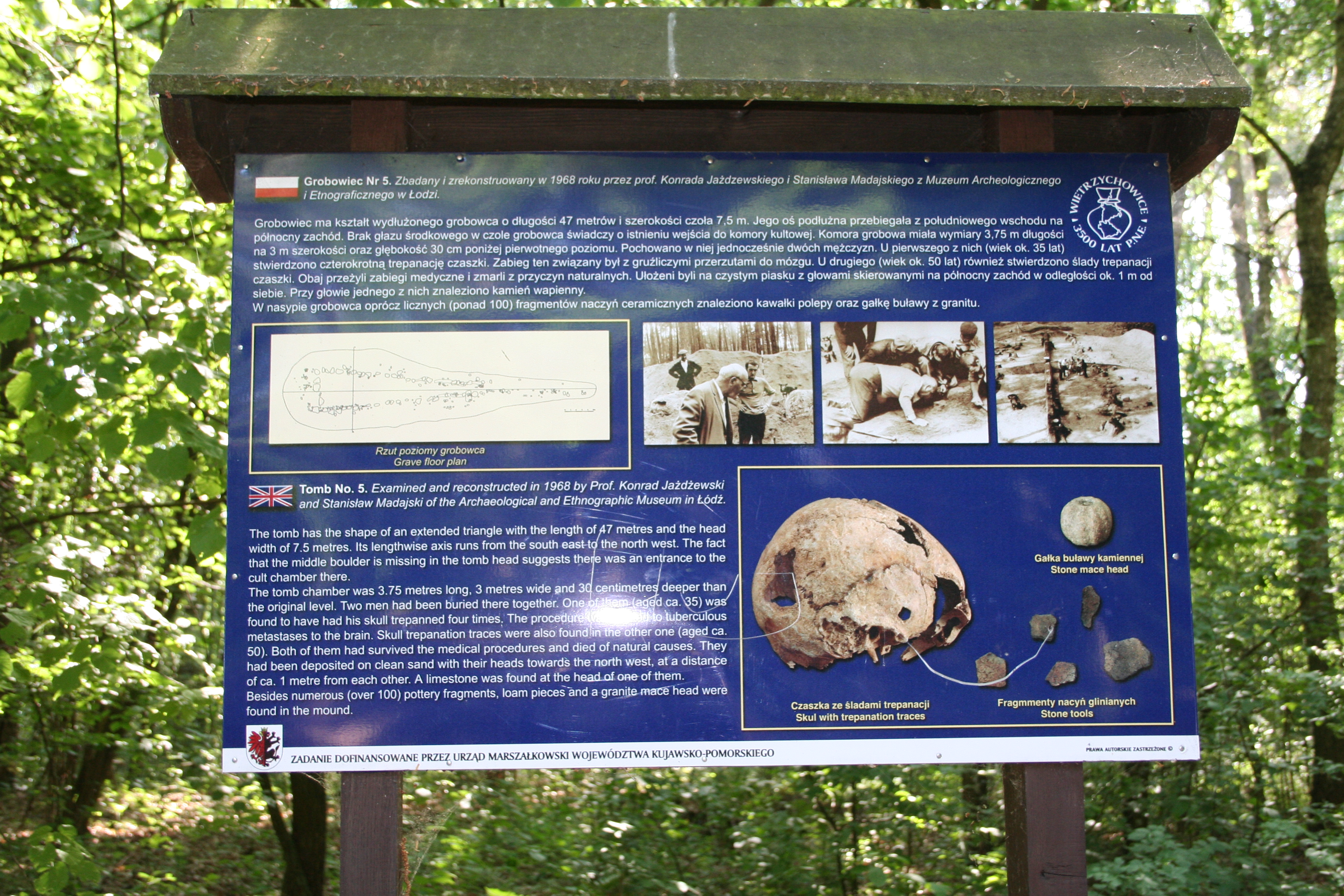
Photographs of findings and research

== Transport ==
Izbica Kujawska lies on the intersection of vovoideship roads 270 and 269.

The nearest railway station is in Włocławek.

== Notable people ==
- Yisroel Moshe Olewski
- Szlama Ber Winer (alias “Yakov Grojanowski’)
