= Chociszewo, Kuyavian-Pomeranian Voivodeship =

Chociszewo
- Village
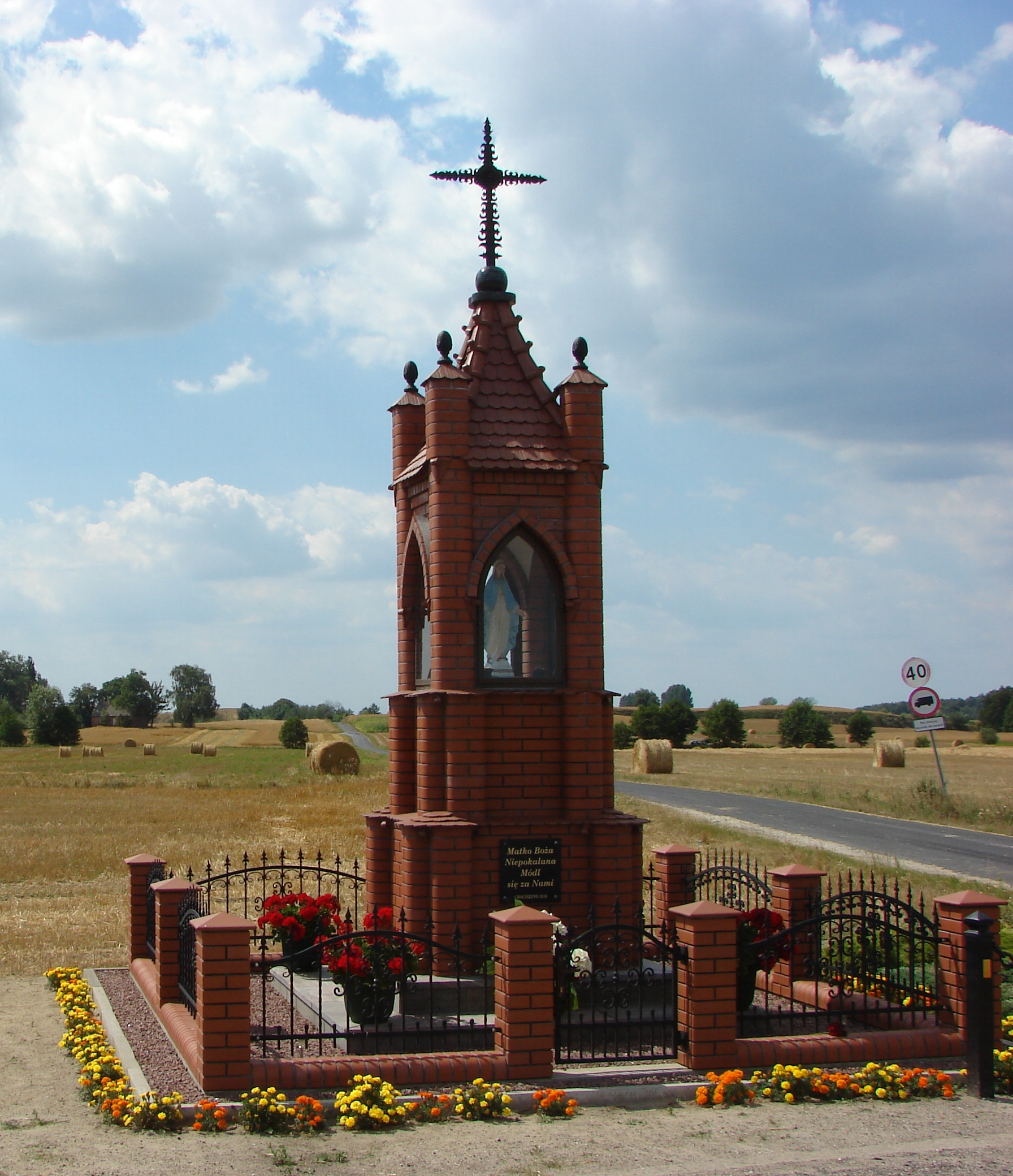
- Wayside shrine

- Location within Poland
- Coordinates: 52°23′N 18°48′E
- Country: Poland
- Voivodeship: Kuyavian-Pomeranian
- County: Włocławek
- Gmina: Izbica Kujawska

Chociszewo [xɔt͡ɕiˈʂɛvɔ] is a village in the administrative district of Gmina Izbica Kujawska, within Włocławek County, Kuyavian-Pomeranian Voivodeship, in north-central Poland.
