= Naczachowo =

- Village
- Location within Poland
- Coordinates: 52°24′N 18°51′E
- Country: Poland
- Voivodeship: Kuyavian-Pomeranian
- County: Włocławek
- Gmina: Izbica Kujawska

Naczachowo [nat͡ʂaˈxɔvɔ] is a village in the administrative district of Gmina Izbica Kujawska, within Włocławek County, Kuyavian-Pomeranian Voivodeship, in north-central Poland.
