= Ciepliny =

- Village
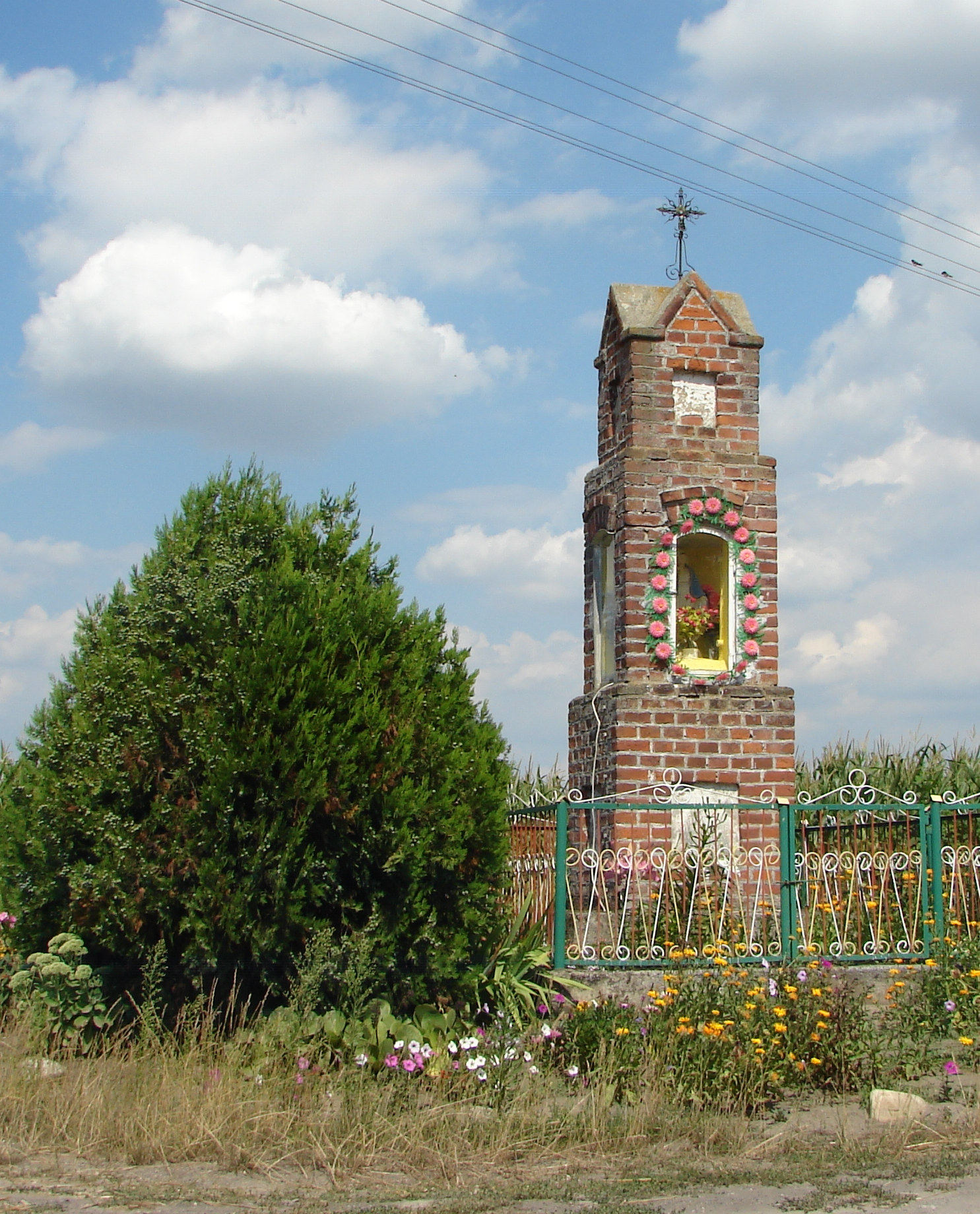
- Wayside shrine

- Location within Poland
- Coordinates: 52°22′N 18°51′E
- Country: Poland
- Voivodeship: Kuyavian-Pomeranian
- County: Włocławek
- Gmina: Izbica Kujawska

Ciepliny [t͡ɕɛˈplinɨ] is a village in the administrative district of Gmina Izbica Kujawska, within Włocławek County, Kuyavian-Pomeranian Voivodeship, in north-central Poland.
