= Komorowo, Włocławek County =

Komorowo
- Village
- Location within Poland
- Coordinates: 52°23′36″N 18°47′28″E
- Country: Poland
- Voivodeship: Kuyavian-Pomeranian
- County: Włocławek
- Gmina: Izbica Kujawska

Komorowo [kɔmɔˈrɔvɔ] is a village in the administrative district of Gmina Izbica Kujawska, within Włocławek County, Kuyavian-Pomeranian Voivodeship, in north-central Poland.
