= Józefowo, Gmina Izbica Kujawska =

Józefowo
- Village
- Location within Poland
- Coordinates: 52°25′19″N 18°47′42″E
- Country: Poland
- Voivodeship: Kuyavian-Pomeranian
- County: Włocławek
- Gmina: Izbica Kujawska

Józefowo (Polish pronunciation: [juzɛˈfɔvɔ]; German: 1939–45 Josefsberg) is a village in the administrative district of Gmina Izbica Kujawska, within Włocławek County, Kuyavian-Pomeranian Voivodeship, in north-central Poland.
