= Błenna =

- Village
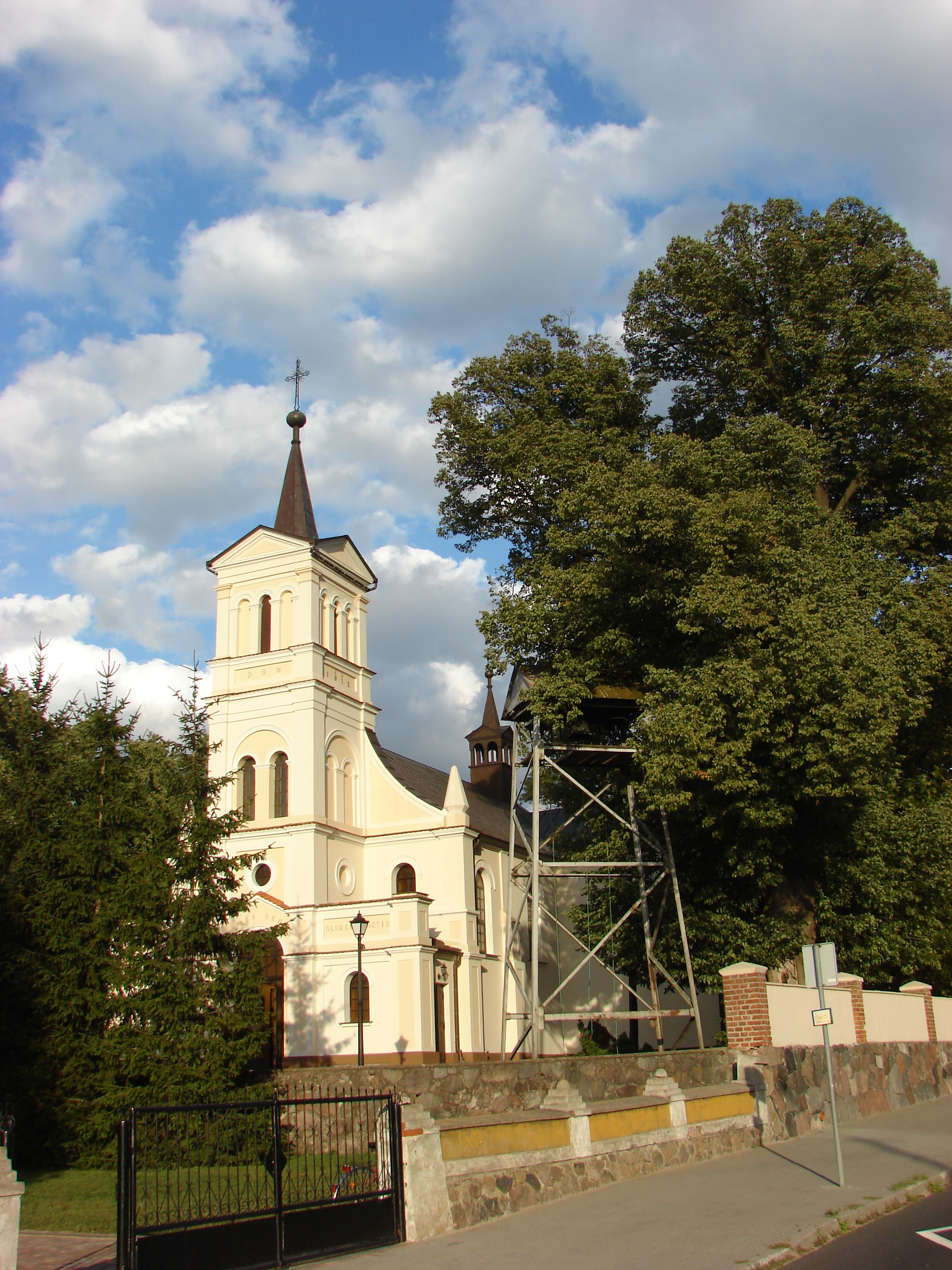
- Parish church of Saint Margaret, built 1861.

- Location within Poland
- Coordinates: 52°23′N 18°53′E
- Country: Poland
- Voivodeship: Kuyavian-Pomeranian
- County: Włocławek
- Gmina: Izbica Kujawska

Błenna [ˈbwɛnna] is a village in the administrative district of Gmina Izbica Kujawska, within Włocławek County, Kuyavian-Pomeranian Voivodeship, in north-central Poland.
