= Modzerowo, Gmina Izbica Kujawska =

Modzerowo
- Village
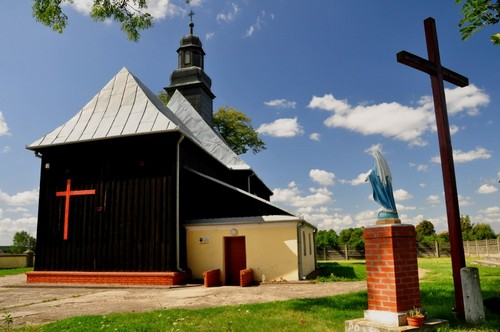

- Location within Poland
- Coordinates: 52°20′54″N 18°46′12″E
- Country: Poland
- Voivodeship: Kuyavian-Pomeranian
- County: Włocławek
- Gmina: Izbica Kujawska
- Population: 180

Modzerowo [mɔd͡zɛˈrɔvɔ] is a village in the administrative district of Gmina Izbica Kujawska, within Włocławek County, Kuyavian-Pomeranian Voivodeship, in north-central Poland.

In the village there is a historic wooden church of St. Stanislaus Bishop and Martyr, from 1591. There is also a Roman Catholic cemetery.
