= Ślazewo =

- Village
- Location within Poland
- Coordinates: 52°25′0″N 18°43′1″E
- Country: Poland
- Voivodeship: Kuyavian-Pomeranian
- County: Włocławek
- Gmina: Izbica Kujawska
- Population: 100

Ślazewo [ɕlaˈzɛvɔ] is a village in the administrative district of Gmina Izbica Kujawska, within Włocławek County, Kuyavian-Pomeranian Voivodeship, in north-central Poland.
