= Ciepliny-Budy =

- Village
- Location within Poland
- Coordinates: 52°20′00″N 18°50′00″E
- Country: Poland
- Voivodeship: Kuyavian-Pomeranian
- County: Włocławek
- Gmina: Izbica Kujawska

Ciepliny-Budy [t͡ɕɛˈplinɨ ˈbudɨ] is a village in the administrative district of Gmina Izbica Kujawska, within Włocławek County, Kuyavian-Pomeranian Voivodeship, in north-central Poland.
