= Kazimierowo, Kuyavian-Pomeranian Voivodeship =

Kazimierowo
- Village
- Location within Poland
- Coordinates: 52°26′50″N 18°42′41″E
- Country: Poland
- Voivodeship: Kuyavian-Pomeranian
- County: Włocławek
- Gmina: Izbica Kujawska

Kazimierowo [kaʑimjɛˈrɔvɔ] is a village in the administrative district of Gmina Izbica Kujawska, within Włocławek County, Kuyavian-Pomeranian Voivodeship, in north-central Poland.
