= Błenna A =

- Village
- Location within Poland
- Coordinates: 52°22′44″N 18°54′16″E
- Country: Poland
- Voivodeship: Kuyavian-Pomeranian
- County: Włocławek
- Gmina: Izbica Kujawska
- Population: 170

Błenna A is a village in the administrative district of Gmina Izbica Kujawska, within Włocławek County, Kuyavian-Pomeranian Voivodeship, in north-central Poland.
