= Nowa Wieś, Gmina Izbica Kujawska =

Nowa Wieś
- Village
- Location within Poland
- Coordinates: 52°22′03″N 18°49′05″E
- Country: Poland
- Voivodeship: Kuyavian-Pomeranian
- County: Włocławek
- Gmina: Izbica Kujawska

Nowa Wieś [ˈnɔva ˈvjɛɕ] is a village in the administrative district of Gmina Izbica Kujawska, within Włocławek County, Kuyavian-Pomeranian Voivodeship, in north-central Poland.
