= Obałki =

- Village
- Location within Poland
- Coordinates: 52°25′16″N 18°50′22″E
- Country: Poland
- Voivodeship: Kuyavian-Pomeranian
- County: Włocławek
- Gmina: Izbica Kujawska

Obałki [ɔˈbau̯ki] is a village in the administrative district of Gmina Izbica Kujawska, within Włocławek County, Kuyavian-Pomeranian Voivodeship, in north-central Poland.

== See also ==
- Kuyavian Pyramids
