= Długie, Włocławek County =

Długie
- Village
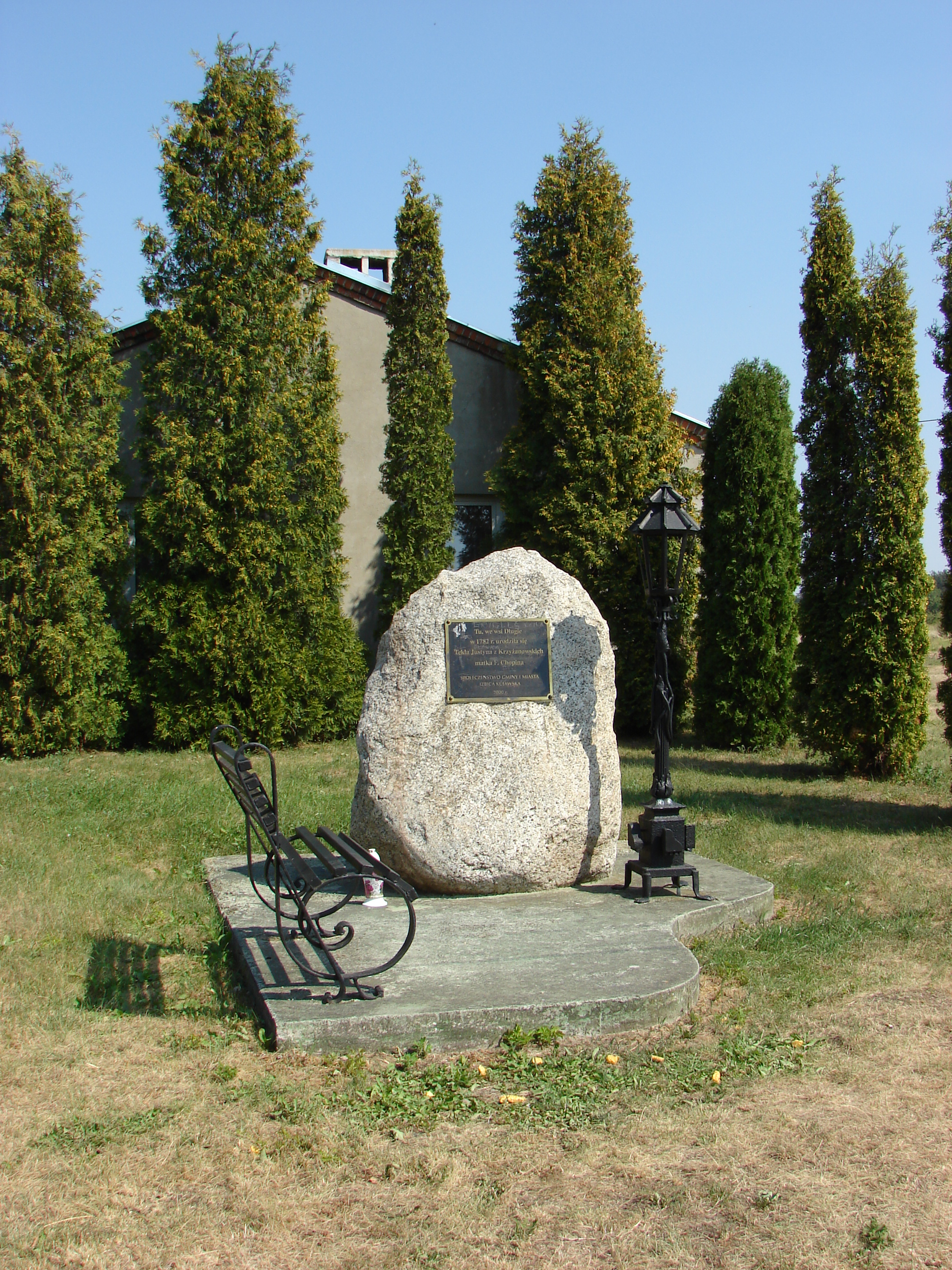
- Memorial stone at the birth site of Tekla Justyna Krzyżanowska, mother of Fryderyk Chopin

- Location within Poland
- Coordinates: 52°24′05″N 18°45′05″E
- Country: Poland
- Voivodeship: Kuyavian-Pomeranian
- County: Włocławek
- Gmina: Izbica Kujawska

Długie [ˈdwuɡʲɛ] is a village in the administrative district of Gmina Izbica Kujawska, within Włocławek County, Kuyavian-Pomeranian Voivodeship, in north-central Poland. The village is mostly known as the birthplace of Justyna Krzyżanowska, mother of Polish pianist, Frédéric Chopin.
