= Wietrzychowice, Kuyavian-Pomeranian Voivodeship =

Wietrzychowice
- Village
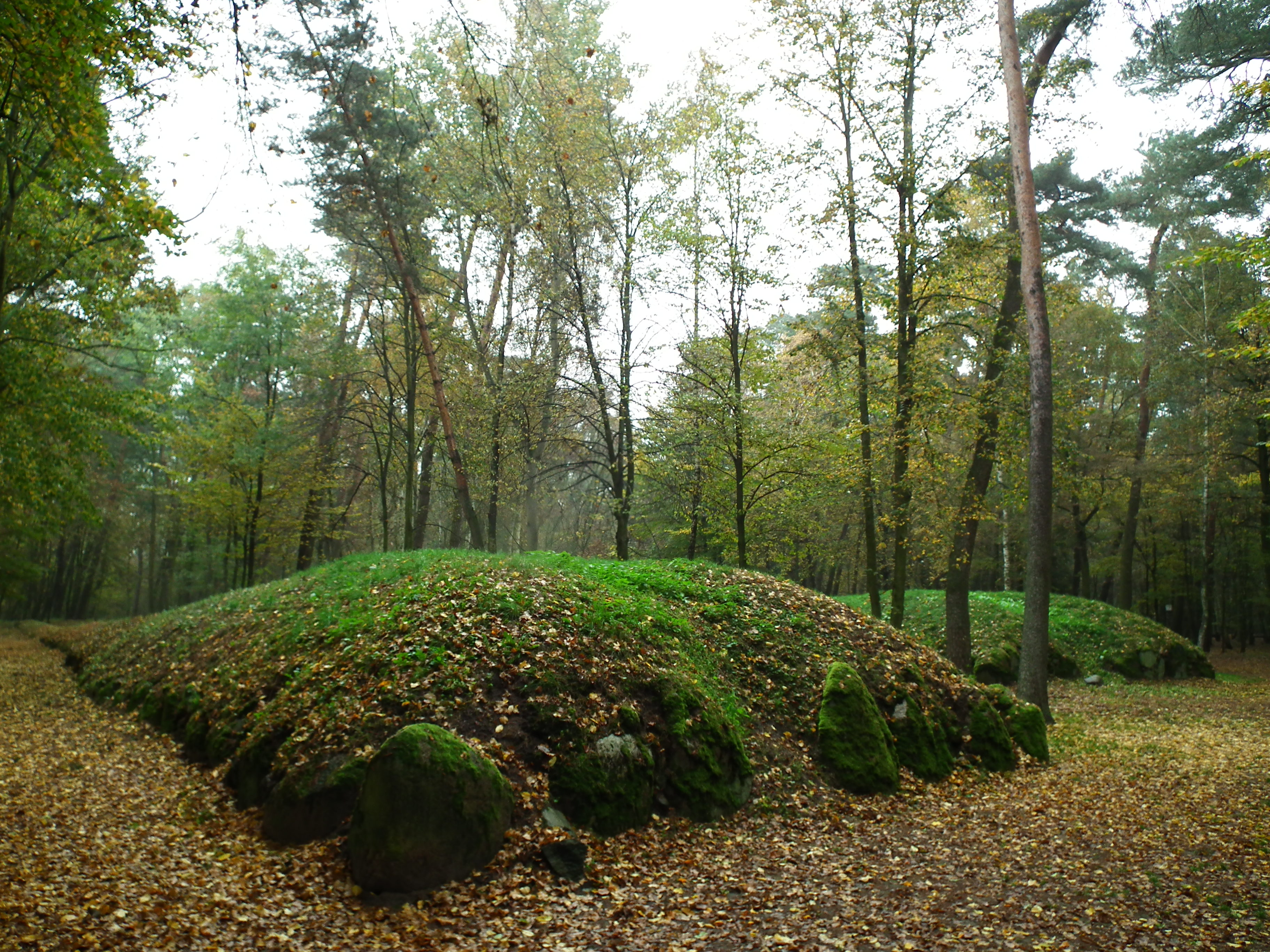
- Earthen long barrows

- Location within Poland
- Coordinates: 52°24′41″N 18°51′34″E
- Country: Poland
- Voivodeship: Kuyavian-Pomeranian
- County: Włocławek
- Gmina: Izbica Kujawska

Wietrzychowice [vjɛtʂɨxɔˈvit͡sɛ] is a village in the administrative district of Gmina Izbica Kujawska, within Włocławek County, Kuyavian-Pomeranian Voivodeship, in north-central Poland.

== Archaeology ==
A group of megalithic tombs called Polish Pyramids or Kuyavian Pyramids have been found in the adjacent forest. They are elongated mounds with a length of up to 150 metres (490 ft) and a height of 2–3 metres (7–10 ft), probably belonging to Funnelbeaker culture during 4000 years BCE.
