= Aleksey Mikhalyov =

Aleksey Mikhalyov may refer to:

- Aleksey Mikhalyov (footballer) (born 1983), Russian football player
- Aleksey Mikhalyov (translator) (1944–1994), Russian translator
