= Stanislava Klimashevskaya =

Russian photographer (1851–1939)

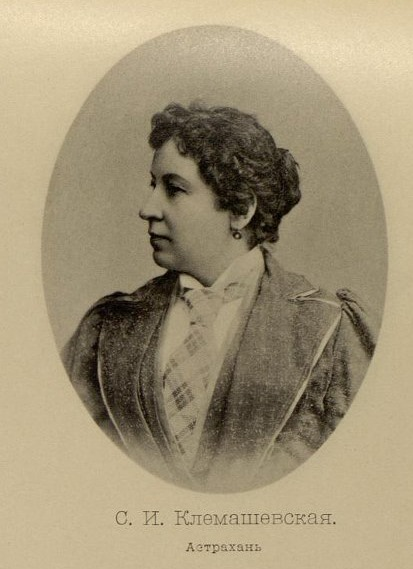
- Born: Stanislava Ivanovna Kruminovic; 1851
- Died: 11 October 1939 (aged 88); Warsaw, Poland
- Resting place: Powązki Cemetery, Warsaw, Poland
- Known for: Photography
- Spouse: Lavrenty Klimashevsky

Stanislava Klimashevskaya (1851 – 11 October 1939) was a Russian photographer and owner of a photo studio in the city of Astrakhan, in the late 19th and early 20th centuries.

== Biography ==
Stanislava Kruminovic was born in the catholic family of polish nobiles Yana and Aloysii Kruminovic. She married photographer Lavrenty Klimashevsky on 10 November 1871. Lavrenty was 42 years old and Stanislava was 20.

=== Klimashevsky Studio ===
Lavrenty Vikentievich appealed to the Astrakhan governor with a request to allow him to open photo studio in 1878. After a mandatory check on December 23, 1878, the certificate No. 5729 was issued for the right to open in the 2nd section of the city of Astrakhan along the embankment of the Varvatsievsky Canal in a photographic institution's own home. This building was located at the Police Bridge between studio of S Vishnevsky and the house of the Sergeev brothers (the former editorial office of the Volga newspaper) and, unfortunately. The building was demolished in the 1970s to clear the area for publishing complex. Klimashevsky bought a photo studio business from Mikhail Kozhebatkin. On the reverse side of the first photographs he took, it is printed: "Central photograph "LK (LK – Lavrenty Klimashevsky.) former Kozhebatkina at the Police Bridge in Astrakhan".

Lavrenty ran the studio until the spring of 1883, when, falling ill at the age of fifty four, he was forced to retire. Klimashevsky asks the Astrakhan governor with a request to transfer the ownership of the studio to his wife Stanislava with both the rights to the photographs and the "workshop itself" with all the devices, machines, materials, furnishings and removable gallery. By order of the governor, Stanislava Klimashevsky was checked by local police. The chief of police reported on April 29, 1883, that "...Klimashevskaya has not been noticed in nothing reprehensible and mostly revolves in the society of persons belonging to Polish nationality, with whom in great respect; was not under investigation and the court and was not and not a member of illegal organisations...". She was issued a certificate No. 1823 for the right to take ownership of a photographic institution and its content on May 16, 1883. She was 32 years at the time. Her husband, having improved his health, retired, and Stanislava Klimashevskaya succeeded in an occupation unusual for a woman at that time.

=== Photography career ===
Stanislava Klimashevskaya not only kept a studio, but was (a rare phenomenon for Russia at that time) as an active photographer. She became was one of the first professional women photographers in Russian Empire.

In 1895, she, as a photographer, toured Bukey Horde, the result of which was a book "School Album of the Bukey Horde". In the preface to the album A. Voskresensky, inspector of Russian-Kyrgyz schools in Bukey Horde, writes: “Mrs. photographer S.I. Klimashevskaya, to which the honor of creating this the album belongs, in the technical attitude took a lot of work and personally made a trip with us across the steppes from the Khan's headquarters through Kazanka, Talovka and Harohoi, so all her photographs were taken directly from nature and serve as an accurate reflection of living reality ”. The gold-edged copy of the album is preserved in the Museum of the Petrovsky Society.

In 1896, she participated in Moscow in the "First Congress of Russian Photography Workers". Klimashevskaya was a full member of the Petrovsky Society of Researchers of the Astrakhan Region. For fifteen years she was a member of the Roman Catholic Charitable Society, and in 1907 she became its chairman.

Stanislava Klimashevskaya paid great attention to the design of the photographs. The early prints read modestly: "The photographic institution of Klimashevskaya in Astrakhan at the Police Bridge, own house", below was a medallion with the profiles of the founders of photography – Niepce, Daguerre and Talbot. Studio letterhead changed seven times, the mats were ordered in lithographs in Warsaw, Vienna and Moscow.

=== Later life ===
On November 16, 1904, at the age of seventy-five, Stanislava husband and studio founder Lavrenty Klimashevsky died. The funeral service took place in the studio room in the presence of relatives, friends and former employees of the atelier. Middle-aged Klimashevskaya was left alone at the head of the business, started by her husband, independently coping with all kinds of difficulties. In 1909 Klimashevskaya published a photo album “South Caspian Fisheries of the Heirs of Lionozov". She published several other books: "Views of the Baskunchak Salt Industry" in 1910; “Astrakhan Mariinsky Women's Gymnasium in 1913 and others.

The Klimashevskys had no children. In her late years Stanislava Klimashevskaya was helped by her niece Florentina Arkushevskaya, who also became a photographer. Stanislava lived with her two nieces in her own house on the Varvatsievsky embankment channel on the second floor. There was also a small photo studio on the ground floor. In the early 1920s. Klimashevskaya, together with her nieces, immigrated to Poland. She died on October 11, 1939 at the age of eighty-eight. Klimashevskaya is buried at the ancient Powązki Cemetery in Warsaw with her sister Kamila Arkushevskaya.

== Awards ==
Klimashevskaya was awarded two gold medals: at the International Industrial exhibition in Madrid in 1884 and at the International Agricultural Exhibition in Naples.

== Collections ==
The funds of the Astrakhan State Museum contain most of the photographs of Klimashevskaya studio, with more than three hundred and fifty pieces and several albums, in which there are many portraits, especially of youth, student, children's, group, family, and wedding photographs. Representatives of different strata of society were photographed in the studio, among which there are many famous names: Chernyshevsky, father John of Kronstadt, governor Sokolovsky, merchants brothers Gubin, Nariman Narimanov and others. Complex photographs were also taken in the atelier, involving a large number of people. Klimashevskaya was the only photographer assigned the rank of “Court Photographer of His Majesty the Shah of Persia” in Astrakhan. It was a great honor and responsibility to bear such a high rank.
