= Voice-over translation =

Multimedia translation technique involving recording over the original audio track

Voice-over translation is an audiovisual translation technique in which, unlike in dubbing, actor voices are recorded over the original audio track which can be heard in the background.

This method of translation is most often used in documentaries and news reports to translate words of foreign-language interviewees in countries where subtitling is not the norm.

== Movies ==
=== In Russia ===
Called Gavrilov translation (Russian: перевод Гаврилова perevod Gavrilova [pʲɪrʲɪˈvod ɡɐˈvrʲiləvə]) or single-voice translation (Russian: одноголосый перевод), the technique takes its name from Andrey Gavrilov, one of the most prominent artists in the area. The term is used to refer to single-voice dubs in general, but not necessarily only those performed by Gavrilov himself. Such dubbing used to be ubiquitous in Russian-speaking countries on films shown on cable television and sold on video, especially illegal copies, and are sometimes included as additional audio tracks on DVDs sold in the region, along with dubbing performed by multiple actors.

During the early years of the Brezhnev era, when availability of foreign films was severely restricted, Goskino, the USSR State Committee for Cinematography, held closed-door screenings of many Western films, open mainly to workers in the film industry, politicians, and other members of the elite. Those screenings were interpreted simultaneously by interpreters who specialised in films where an effective conveyance of humour, idioms, and other subtleties of speech were required. Some of the most prolific "Gavrilov translators" began their careers at such screenings, including Andrey Gavrilov himself, as well as Aleksey Mikhalyov and Leonid Volodarskiy. Their services were also used at film festivals, where Western films were accessible to a larger public, and allowed the interpreters to gain further recognition.

With the introduction of VCRs in the 1970s, and the subsequent boom in illegal unlicensed videocassette sales, which were the only means of seeing Western films available to the general public, the same interpreters began to lend their voices to these tapes. Many of their voices had a distinct nasal quality, most pronounced in Volodarskiy, which led to the rise of an urban legend that the interpreters wore a noseclip so that the authorities would not be able to identify them by their voice and arrest them. Interviews with many of the interpreters revealed that this was not true, and that authorities generally turned a blind eye to them, focusing their efforts on the distributors of the tapes instead. This was also due to the lack of a specific law forbidding the work of these interpreters and they could only be prosecuted under the relatively minor offence of illicit work.

The three aforementioned interpreters, Gavrilov, Mikhalyov, and Volodarskiy, were the leading names in film dubbing in the last decades of the 20th century, with dubs done by each of them numbering in the thousands. Many of these dubs were made using simultaneous interpretation, due to time constraints caused by competition among the distributors to be the first to release a new production, as well as the sheer volume of new films. Whenever possible, however, the interpreters preferred to watch the films a few times first, making notes on the more difficult parts of the dialogue, and only then record a dub, which also allowed them to refuse dubbing movies they didn't like. While each of the interpreters dubbed a wide range of films, with many films being available in multiple versions done by different interpreters, the big names usually had specific film genres that they were known to excel at. Gavrilov, for instance, was usually heard in action films, including Total Recall and Die Hard; Mikhalyov specialised in comedy and drama, most notably A Streetcar Named Desire and The Silence of the Lambs; while Volodarskiy, who is most readily associated not with a particular genre, but with the nasal intonation of his voice, is best remembered for his dubbing of Star Wars. It is unclear why the term "Gavrilov translation" came to bear Gavrilov's name, despite Mikhalyov being the most celebrated of the interpreters, though the popular nature of films dubbed by Gavrilov may be the most likely explanation. Other notable names of the period include Vasiliy Gorchakov, Mikhail Ivanov, Grigoriy Libergal, and Yuriy Zhivov.

After perestroika and the collapse of the Soviet Union, when restrictions on Western films were lifted, movie theatres, the state television channels, and eventually DVD releases primarily employed multiple-voice dubbings done by professional actors. However, cable television and the thriving unauthorized video industry continued fuelling demand for Gavrilov translations. This period marked a significant drop in the quality of such dubbings, as the intense competition between the numerous infringement groups and the lack of available funds resulted in releases with non-professional in-house dubbing. This was further exacerbated by the death of Mikhalev in 1994 and fewer recordings being produced by many of the other skilled veterans of the industry, who pursued alternative career paths. Numerous well-regarded newcomers took their place, including Alexey Medvedev, Petr Glants, Peter Kartsev, Pavel Sanayev, Sergey Vizgunov, and most famously Dmitry "Goblin" Puchkov. The latter is notorious for his direct translation of profanity, as well as alternative "funny translations" of Hollywood blockbusters, such as Star Wars: Storm in the Glass after Star Wars: Episode I – The Phantom Menace.

In later years, however, the use of Russian mat (profanity) in the dubbings has been a great source of controversy. While many unlicensed recordings do not shy away from translating expletives literally, Gavrilov, Mikhalyov, and Volodarskiy have all stated that they feel that Russian mat is more emotionally charged and less publicly acceptable than English obscenities, and would only use it in their dubs when they felt it was absolutely crucial to the film's plot.

Dmitry Puchkov has been very outspoken about syncronous interpretation, stating that it should be abandoned in favour of a more precise translation, with thorough efforts to research and find Russian equivalents in cases of lexical gaps, and maintains numerous lists of gaffes made by interpreters, including highly experienced ones such as Mikhalyov. However, others have commented that the creativity of good interpreters can make the film more enjoyable, though deviating from the filmmaker's original intentions.

=== In Poland ===
Voice-over translation is the traditional translation method in Polish television and DVDs (which most of the time provide the original audio track), except for children's material, especially animation, which is often fully dubbed. The word lektor ('reader') is used to refer to the translation.

The most notable readers are Stanisław Olejniczak, Janusz Szydłowski, Piotr Borowiec and Maciej Gudowski. Tomasz Knapik, who died in 2021, was also named notable.

== Sample ==
See the right-hand side of this page.

A Spanish voice-over translation (28:25)
Wikipedia co-founder Jimmy Wales speaking in English with a Spanish voice-over translation by Wikimedia México

== See also ==
- Benshi
- Dub localization
