= Association of the Polish Youth "Zet" =

Pre-1914 Polish organisation

The Związek Młodzieży Polskiej "Zet" ("Union or Association of the Polish Youth "Zet"", abbreviated ZMP or more commonly Zet) was a clandestine organization of Polish students at universities of the three partitioning powers (Russia, Germany, Austria) and other European universities with larger groups of Polish students. Its aim was to bring together talented young men and further educate them as community leaders, pro-Polish agitators and possibly for a role in the civil service of a future Polish state. Universities where Zet was active included St. Petersburg, Moscow, Kiev (Russian Empire), Warsaw (then in the Russian partition), Berlin, Breslau, Munich (Germany), Vienna (Austria), Kraków, Lemberg (Lviv, then in the Austrian partition), Paris (France), Zürich, and Geneva (Switzerland).

Zet was formed in Kraków, then in Austria, by Zygmunt Balicki (1858-1916), a Lublin-born national activist who had escaped from the Russian partition, in 1887. In the following year, it became a formal part of the larger conspirative organization Liga Polska ("Polish League") formed by Zygmunt Miłkowski (pseudonym Teodor Tomaż Jeż) from his exile in Switzerland in 1887.

Its activities included conspirative meetings in which the members studied and discussed issues from Polish history that were not part of the regular curricula at the universities of the partitioning powers. It also organized Polish-language instruction for interested students of Polish origin with a deficient command of the (standard) language. Zet published the magazines Teka ("Portfolio"), Dla Polski ("For Poland"), Wici ("The Web"), which Polish students secretly circulated among themselves.

In Germany, Zet members were required to undergo voluntary military service. This allowed them to avoid being surveilled by the regular police, improved their physical condition and knowledge of military topics. Most importantly, it allowed them to keep their personal weapon and equipment in their accommodation outside the barracks. The equipment was then used in conspirative military training sessions.

Zet selected its members with great care in order to avoid infiltration by the authorities. Usually, only such university students were accepted that had previously been involved with Polish groups at secondary school. The organization was strictly hierarchical and the hierarchy was kept secret even among members, as far as possible. There existed a three-level hierarchy, in which the lower levels did not know about the members on the higher level(s), or even their existence:

- koledzy ("colleagues"):
- towarzysze ("comrades")
- bracia ("brothers")

Each cell on any level was led by a "senior" (starszy kolega, "senior colleague" etc.) who kept in touch with a representative of the superior level. The supreme leadership, called centralizacja ("centralization"), was initially located in Zürich, later in Warsaw.

In 1894, a pro-Polish demonstration in Warsaw provoked a massive police action and led to the arrest of many Polish students including key Zet members. After this, the entire organization remained disbanded until 1898, when it was re-established under the auspices of the Liga Narodowa, an organization established by former members of Liga Polska including Balicki, and led by Roman Dmowski. In 1909, Zet left the Liga Narodowa. A part of its members started a new group, Zarzewie, another, in 1911, the "New Zet" (Nowy Zet). In World War I, many Zet members fought in Polish Legions. In 1914, SL Janikowski was a member of the three man central committee in Warsaw.

In Breslau, Germany (now Wrocław, Poland), Wojciech Korfanty was an active Zet member during his time at the university there (1889-1901). The article Precz z Centrum ("Away with the Centre Party"), which appealed to the Polish minority in Germany to shift their loyalty from the Catholic German Centre Party to its own political representatives, and which Korfanty published in 1901, was originally drafted in the Breslau Zet group, which comprised roughly a third of all Polish students enrolled at this university.

== See also ==
- Secret society
