= Leopold Janikowski =

Polish explorer and ethnographer

Leopold Ludwik Janikowski
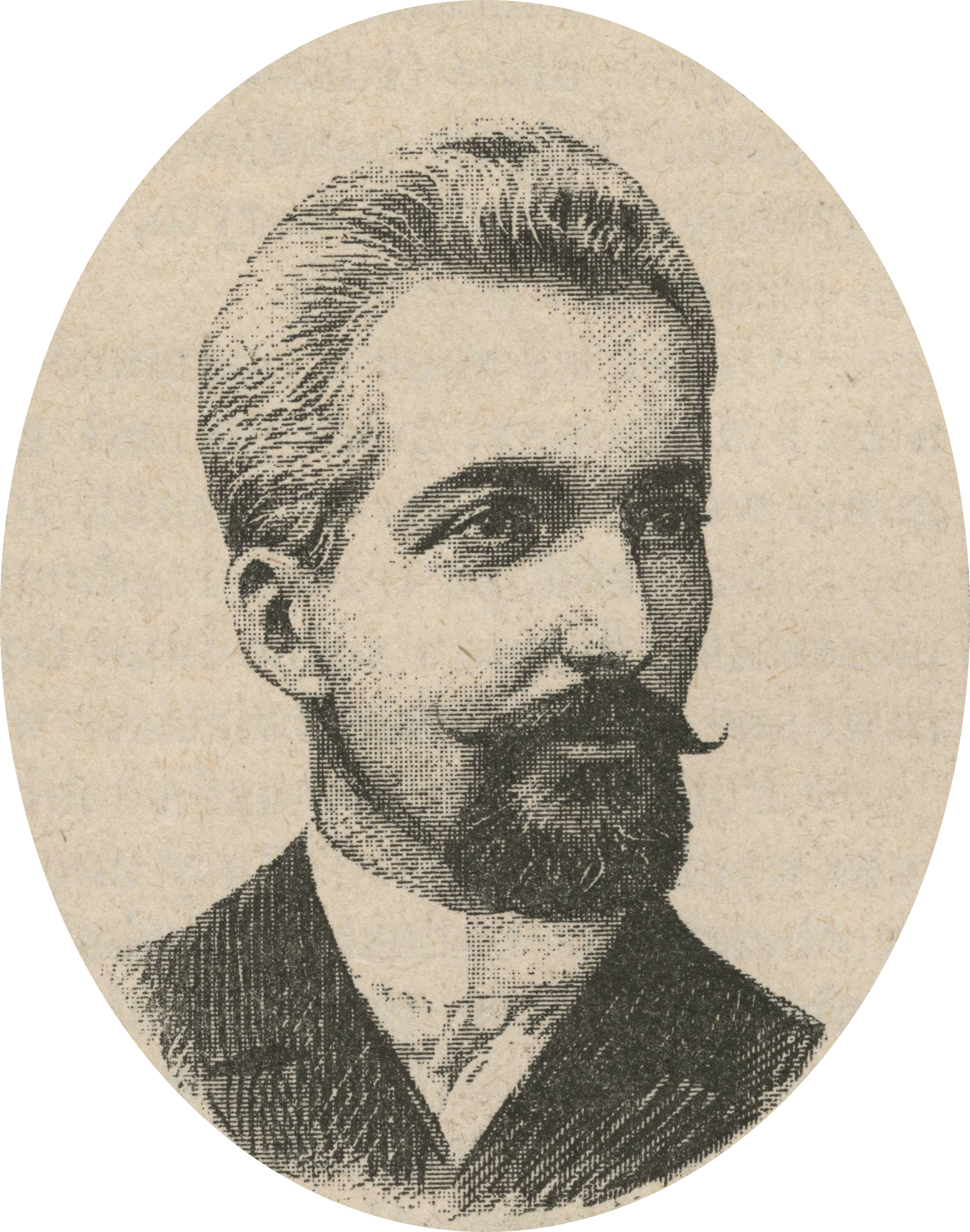
- Mazovian Digital Library, 1893
- Born: 14 November 1855; Dąbrówka, Warsaw, Poland
- Died: 8 December 1942 (aged 87); Zielonka, Warsaw, Poland
- Resting place: Powązki Cemetery, Warsaw, Poland
- Occupations: Meteorologist and Museum Director
- Known for: Explorer, Ethnographer
- Spouse: Zofia Krajcewicz
- Children: Stanisław Janikowski
- Parent(s): Jan and Franciszka (née Wolkewicz)

Leopold Janikowski (14 November 1855 - 8 December 1942) was a Polish explorer and ethnographer.

== Biography ==
Leopold Ludwik Janikowski was born on 14 November 1855 in Dąbrówka, now part of Warsaw (Białołęka) in Poland, son of Jan (born about 1817) and Franciszka (née Wolkewicz born about 1827). He died on 8 December 1942 in Zielonka, near Warsaw and is buried in Powązki Cemetery, Warsaw.

He attended high school in Kalisz. After moving to Warsaw, he worked for a long time at the Warsaw Astronomical Observatory in the department of meteorology. The Oxford companion to world exploration refers to Leopold Janikowski as a “well educated scientist”.

=== Voyage to Cameroon (1882–1886) ===
In 1881, he responded to a notice posted in the magazine Wanderer (Polish: Wedrowiec) Stefan Szolc-Rogoziński a 20-year-old naval officer of the Russian Navy, looking for companions to accompany him on a planned trip. The Polish expedition was organised to establish a geographical station in Ambas Bay, whose purpose was “to explore the Cameroon Mountains and to penetrate the interior in search of Lake Liba or Riba”.

This first documented Polish research expedition to Africa took place between 1882 and 1885, and was conducted by Stefan Szolc-Rogozinski, Leopold Janikowski and Klemens Tomczek. They visited Madeira, the Canary Islands, Liberia, and the island of Fernando Po.

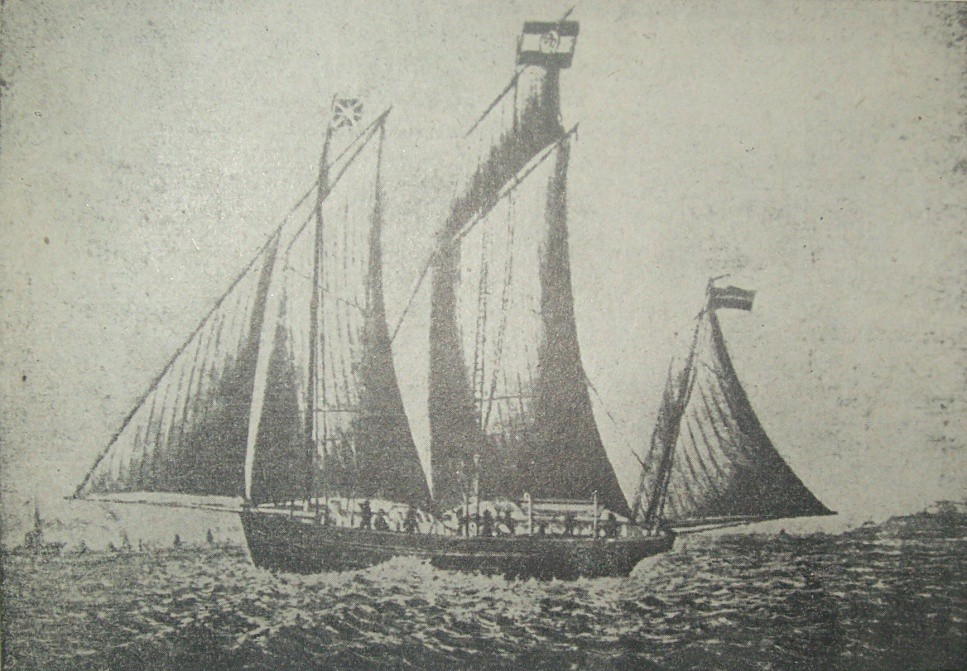
Lucja Malgorzata 1882

They embarked at Le Havre on 13 December 1882 in the sailing vessel Łucja-Małgorzata (originally French: La Lucie Marguerite), a lugger of 100 tons with a French crew flying the French flag and the Polish colours of the Warsaw Syrena (coat of arms of the city of Warsaw). They sheltered from a storm for a few days in the English port of Falmouth, Cornwall from 16 to 20 December 1882.

After visiting Madeira, Liberia and Assini they entered on 16 April 1883 the port of Santa Isabel on the Spanish island Fernando Po in the Gulf of Guinea.

Their journey to Cameroon took them four months, but soon after arriving on Fernando Po on 16 April 1883 the three companions acquired the island of Mondoleh near Cameroon for their scientific station. Possibly this was among land 'bought' from the Wovca people for £55 (see Ardener, S.G. 1968: 69).

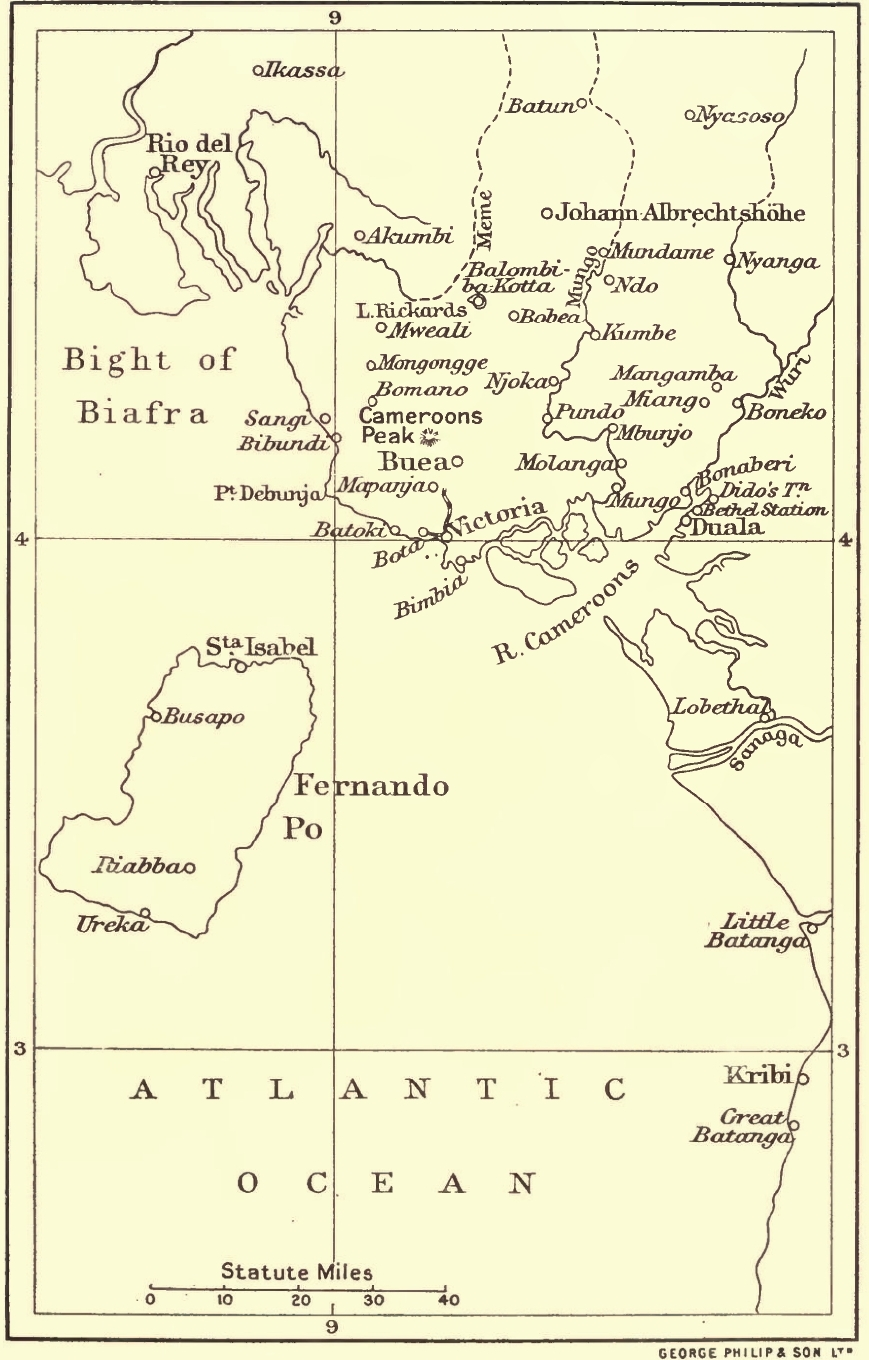
Cameroons (in 1908)

Leopold Janikowski was concerned at this time mainly with the construction of the camp for the expedition on the Isle de Mondoleh. He met local Bubi people on Fernando Po, studied and later wrote about their habits, law and history and lived in the vicinity of the tribe. For example, the Polish expeditionary Janikowski (1887) is described by Moreno in 2013 as one who provided the most precise information on the political chiefdoms and on Bubi military organization at that moment. The 1920 Peace handbooks issued by the historical section of the Foreign office XX, Spanish and Italian possessions, H.M. Majesty's Stationery Office, 1920 referred to Janikowski's article on Fernando Po.

In the Scramble for Africa, against the German interest in Kamerun (Cameroon), the British were assisted by the two Polish nationals, Stefan Szolc Rogozinski and Leopold Janikowski, who signed more than thirty-five treaties with local leaders.

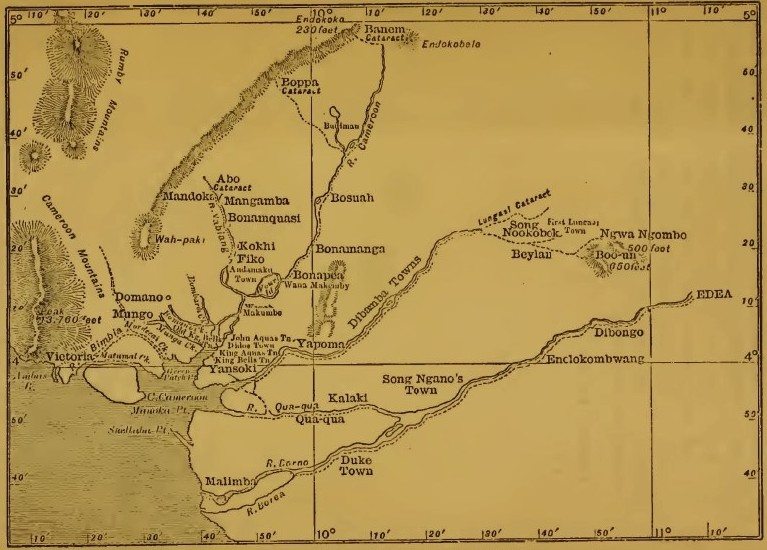
Map of Cameroons (1884)

Rogoziński and Janikowski made a short three-week trip to Gabon, collecting anthropological and ethnographic material, returning on 14 July 1884 to find German naval vessels had arrived in Cameroon waters and that, to their dismay, a German protectorate had been declared over the Cameroon river area and Bimbia. This resulted on 12 February in the German corvette Bismarck wounding and arresting Janikowski on the open sea, travelling by canoe from Batoki to Victoria, in the belief that they had got hold of Rogoziński. At about this time the Swedes Knutson and Waldau were officially authorized by Captain Karcher to arrest 'S.S. Rogozinski and hand him over to the German Authorities'. According to Rear-Admiral Knorr, the senior German officer in the area: "As M. Janikowski and his boat's crew were fired upon and their lives imperilled by a mistake, they are evidently entitled to demand a just and reasonable compensation."

Janikowski, together with Rogoziński and the German reporter Zöller, climbed to the peak of the Mount Cameroon in December 1884. They were the first Poles and only the third European expedition to the top (after Burton in 1860 and Comber in 1878).

The expedition returned to Europe in the summer of 1885.

First the travellers went to London and Paris. There began their activity in lecture halls and the popular press. Leopold Janikowski was a member of the French Geographical Society and published in their magazine. Then the expedition returned to Poland, and the harvest collected in Africa became the source of the idea for the formation of the Ethnographic Museum in Warsaw.

=== Polish colony ===
At that time, the Third Partition of Poland (1795-1918) conducted by the three invaders - the Russian Empire, the Kingdom of Prussia and Habsburg Austria in the 18th century - had resulted in the elimination of the sovereign state of Poland. Hence Rogoziński served in the Russian Navy. Rogoziński's diary, according to Baginsky, confirms “his real intention … to create a second Free Fatherland for emigrants from his oppressed country”. Janikowski confirms this in his book in 1936:

"When in 1880, I met Rogoziński and he unfolded before me his plans of research and one of the main objectives, of necessity hidden, namely the search for a suitable site for Polish colonization, as a future refuge for those who are not only physically but spiritually too tightly held under one of the three of our invaders - this plan grabbed me, and I gave him my whole soul. Fate, however, on the contrary, did not allow us to carry out this plan." (Note: Original Polish: Kiedy w 1880 r. poznałem Rogozińskiego i kiedy roztoczył on przede mną swoje plany badań naukowych oraz jeden z głównych celów, z konieczności ukrytych, a mianowicie wyszukanie odpowiedniego terenu dla kolonizacji polskiej, jako przyszłej ostoi dla tych, którym nie tylko materialnie, ale i duchowo było za ciasno pod rządami trzech naszych zaborców, — plan ten porwał mnie, i oddałem mu się całą duszą. Losy jednak, przeciwnie, nie pozwoliły nam tego planu przeprowadzić.)

=== Voyage to West Africa (1887–1890) ===
In early 1887 Leopold Janikowski travelled for the second time to Africa, this time to settle in the vicinity of the Crystal Heights in the middle of the Mpangue tribe.

In December 1889 he returned to Warsaw (due to annexation of the Cameroons by troops of the German Navy). On the second expedition, he brought back 1300 different exhibits.

=== Ethnographic Museum ===
Janikowski's collection of 1300 items from the Cameroons were on display in his Ethnographic Exhibition. In 1902 it was donated to the Museum of Industry and Agriculture in Warsaw, on Kraków Street (66 Krakowskie Przedmieście). Ethnologia Polonia described these as “the most valuable” items bought from Africa to the museum.

From 1900 to 1932 Janikowski was deputy director, later Director and finally administrative director of the Museum.

In September 1939, as a result of the bombing and fire, the building of the Museum of Industry and Agriculture at 66 Krakowskie Przedmieście was completely destroyed. The few remaining objects disappeared in the subsequent years of the war. On the whole, there is virtually nothing left of the over-50-year-old Warsaw Ethnographic Museum.

=== Zielonka ===
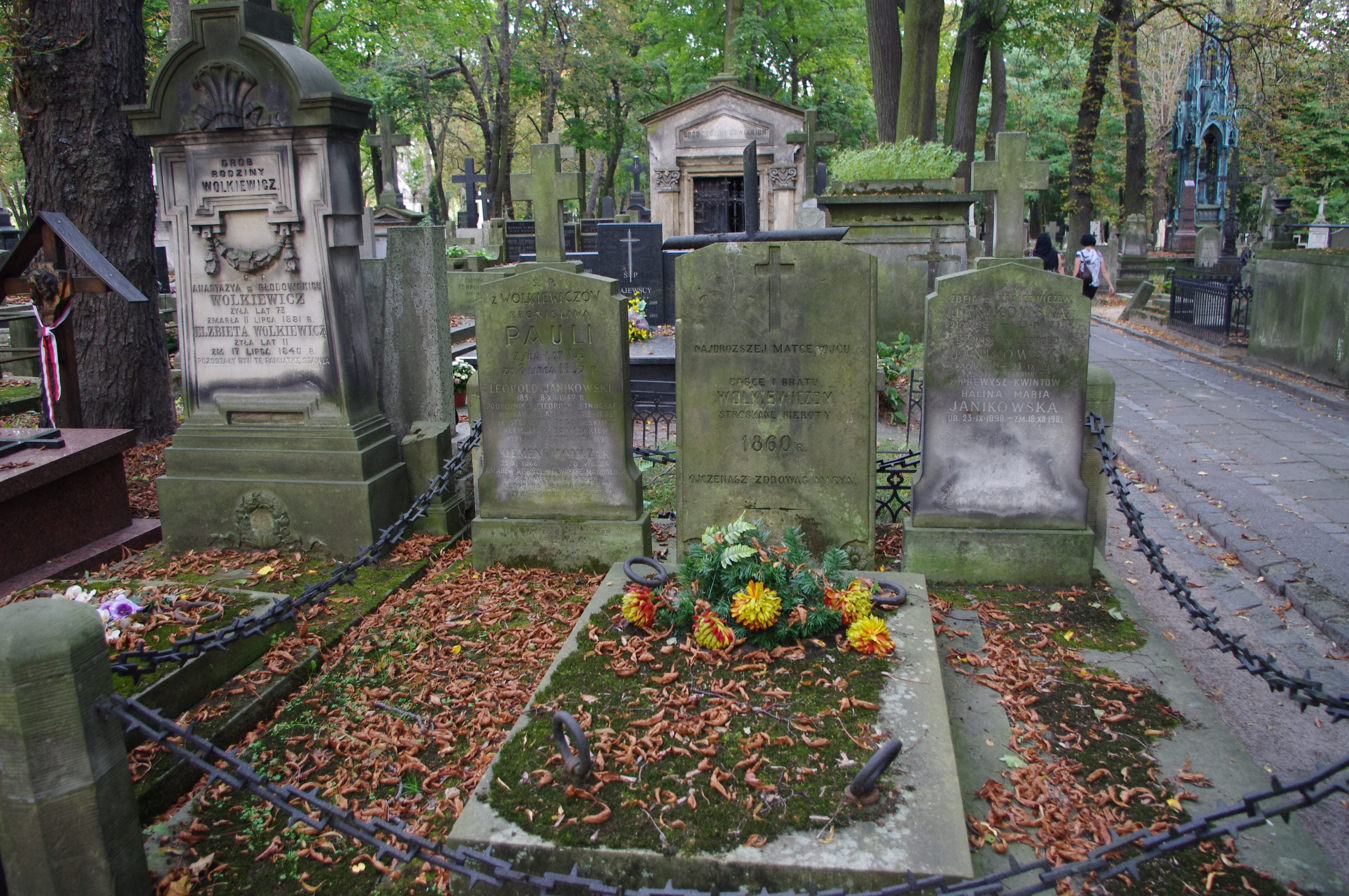
Leopold Janikowski (grave)

In the war years, Janikowski and his wife lived in Zielonka where they hid Jews in a cellar under the kitchen. He died in Zielonka on 8 December 1942 and is buried in Powązki Cemetery, Warsaw.

=== Family ===
Leopold Janikowski had one child, Stanisław Leopold Janikowski, who became a diplomat.
