= Leonid Volodarsky =

Russian translator (1950–2023)

Leonid Volodarsky Леонид Вениаминович Володарский
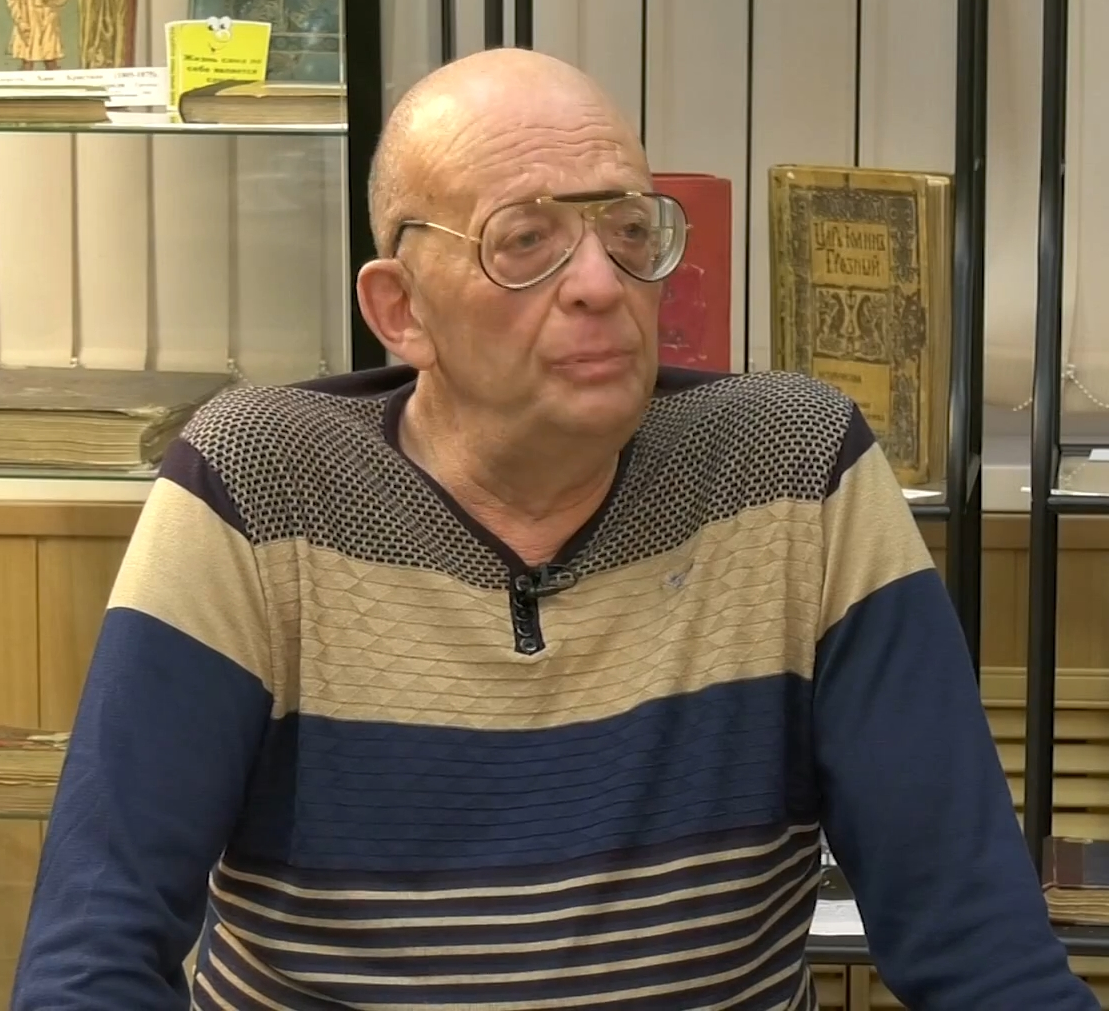
- Volodarsky in 2018
- Born: 20 May 1950; Moscow, Russian SFSR, USSR
- Died: 7 August 2023 (aged 73)
- Known for: Film translator radio show anchor writer

Leonid Veniaminovitch Volodarsky (Russian: Леони́д Вениами́нович Волода́рский; 20 May 1950 – 7 August 2023) was a Russian translator, writer, and weekly radio show anchor. He is mostly known in Russia as one of the home video voice-over translators of 1980s and 1990s films such as The Empire Strikes Back, Terminator dilogy, Last Action Hero, A Nightmare on Elm Street and others. Volodarsky was also the first translator of Stephen King books into Russian.

== Biography ==
I'm not interested in my voice at all. Back in time I was a film translator and so, now I'm recognized primary by voice, constantly asked about a clothespin on my nose. I don't like it. I'm not an opera singer and my voice is not in a slightest bit related to my individuality. They say it's a kind of history?.. Well, OK. But I live at present.

— Leonid Volodarsky

Volodarsky died on 7 August 2023, at the age of 73 due to heart failure.

== See also ==
- Gavrilov translation
