= Powązki Cemetery =

Cemetery in Warsaw, Poland

- Cmentarz Powązkowski
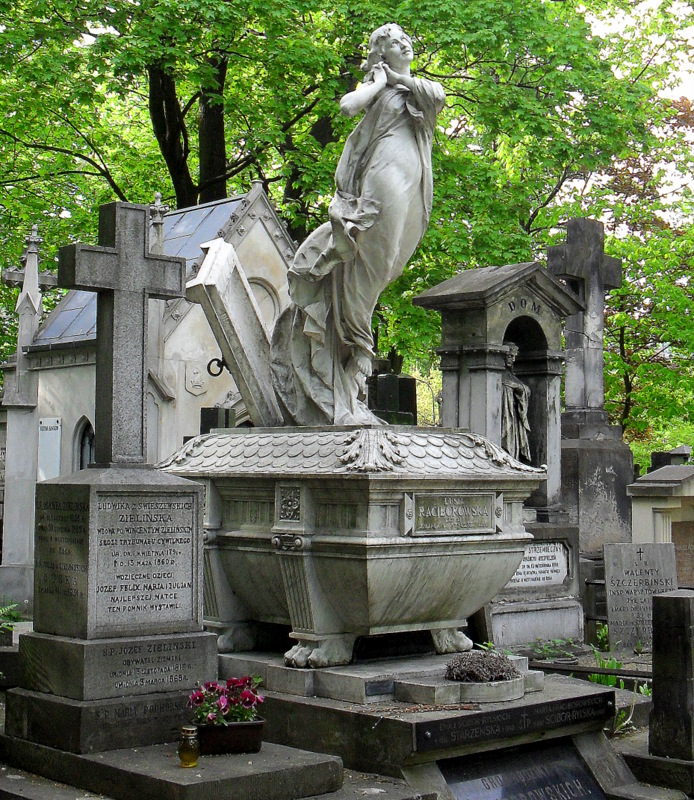
- Example of lavish tombstones at the cemetery
- Interactive map of Powązki Cemetery

Details
- Established: 4 November 1790
- Location: Warsaw
- Country: Poland
- Coordinates: 52°15′07″N 20°58′22″E
- Type: Public
- Size: 43 hectares (110 acres)
- No. of graves: Over one million
- Website: Unofficial website

Powązki Cemetery (Polish pronunciation: [pɔˈvɔ̃skʲi]; Polish: Cmentarz Powązkowski), also known as Stare Powązki (English: Old Powązki), is a historic necropolis located in Wola district, in the western part of Warsaw, Poland. It is the most famous cemetery in the city and one of the oldest, having been established in 1790. It is the burial place of many illustrious individuals from Polish history. Some are interred along the "Avenue of the Distinguished" – Aleja Zasłużonych, created in 1925. It is estimated that over one million people are buried at Powązki.

The cemetery is often confused with the newer Powązki Military Cemetery, which is located to the north-west of Powązki Cemetery.

== History ==
Powązki Cemetery was established on 4 November 1790 on land donated by nobleman Melchior Szymanowski, and consecrated on 20 May 1792. Initially it covered an area of only about 2.5 ha. In the same year Saint Charles Borromeo Church, designed by Dominik Merlini, was built on the northern edge of the cemetery. The catacombs were erected soon thereafter.

Several other cemeteries were founded in the area: the Jewish cemetery, and those of the Calvinist, Lutheran, Caucasian and Tatar communities. The Orthodox cemetery is also located in the vicinity.

As in many old European cemeteries, some of the tombstones in Powązki were created by renowned sculptors, both Polish and foreign. Some of the monuments are examples of the then prevailing styles in art and architecture.

On All Saints Day (1 November) and All Souls' Day (Polish: Zaduszki; 2 November) in Warsaw, vigils are held not only in the Roman Catholic cemeteries, but in the Protestant, Muslim, Jewish, and Orthodox cemeteries as well to honor the deceased and express remembrance. At Powązki Cemetery, many graves are lit up by votive candles.

== Notable burials ==
A few of the notables buried here are:

- Tekla Bądarzewska-Baranowska (1834–1861), composer
- Izabela Barcińska née Chopin, (1811–1881), younger sister of Fryderyk Chopin
- Anna Bilińska (1857–1893), painter
- Wojciech Bogusławski (1757–1829), writer, actor, director
- Stefan Bryła (1886–1943), notable for first welding bridge-Maurzyce Bridge
- Jan Gotlib Bloch (1836–1902), banker, railroad entrepreneur, philanthropist, economist, economist and social activist
- Halina Chmielewska (1899–1982), doctor and insurgent during the Warsaw Uprising
- Emilia Chopin (1812–1827), youngest sister of Fryderyk Chopin
- Ludwika Jędrzejewicz née Chopin (1807–1855), oldest sister of Fryderyk Chopin
- Mikołaj Chopin (1771–1844), father of Fryderyk Chopin
- Tekla Justyna Chopin (1782–1861), mother of Fryderyk Chopin
- Halina Chrostowska (1929–1990), printmaker, activist, and educator
- Gerard Antoni Ciołek (1909–1966), architect and historian of gardens
- Ignacy Dobrzyński (1807–1867), composer
- Jerzy Duszyński (1917–1978), actor
- Józef Elsner (1769–1854), composer and conductor. Piano teacher of Fryderyk Chopin.
- Władysław Filipkowski (1892–1950), military commander
- Pola Gojawiczyńska (1896–1963), writer
- Józef Gosławski, (1908–1963), sculptor and medallic artist
- Marceli Godlewski (1865–1945), Righteous Among the Nations
- Leopold Janikowski (1855–1942), meteorologist, explorer and ethnographer
- Stanisław Janikowski (1891–1965), Polish diplomat
- Stefan Jaracz (1883–1945), actor
- Jan Kiepura (1902–1966), singer and actor
- Krzysztof Kieślowski (1941–1996), film director
- Jan Kiliński (1760–1819), freedom fighter
- Stefan Kisielewski (1911–1991), art critic and writer
- Stanislava Klimashevskaya (1851–1939), photographer and studio owner
- Tomasz Knapik (1943–2021), film, radio and television reader
- Krzysztof Komeda (1931–1969), jazz composer
- Alfred Kowalski (1849–1915), painter
- Henryk Kuna (1885–1945), sculptor
- Witold Lutosławski (1913–1994), composer
- Józefat Ignacy Łukasiewicz (1789–1850), painter-artist
- Maciej Masłowski (1901–1976), art historian
- Stanisław Masłowski (1853–1926), painter-artist
- Witold Małcużyński (1914–1977), classical pianist
- Stefan Mazurkiewicz (1888–1945), co-founder of the Warsaw school of mathematics
- Jerzy Mierzejewski (1917–2012), artist and pedagogue
- Stanisław Moniuszko (1819–1872), composer
- Janusz Nasfeter (1920–1998) – film director and screenwriter; moved in 2018 from the Służew Old Cemetery
- Ola Obarska (1910–1992), singer and actress
- Stanisław Olszewski (1852–1898), engineer and inventor
- Antoni Osuchowski (1849–1928), philanthropist and national activist
- Piotr Pawlukiewicz (1960–2020), Roman Catholic priest, doctor of pastoral theology
- Lech Pijanowski (1928–1974), film-maker and game designer
- Jerzy Pniewski (1913–1989), physicist
- Krystyna Piotrowska (1938–2022), Polish geologist, cartographer, professor
- Bolesław Prus (1847–1912), journalist and novelist
- Grzegorz Przemyk (1964–1983), poet murdered by Milicja Obywatelska
- Kazimierz Pużak (1883–1950), died in the Communist prison, secretly buried in Powązki
- Emil Rauer (1870–1943), industrialist, creator and commander of a railway protection formation, social activist, and independence fighter
- Halina Regulska (1899–1994), racing driver, socialite, author, member of Polish resistance movement in World War II
- Władysław Reymont (1867–1925), Nobel Prize-winning novelist
- Edward Rydz-Śmigły (1886–1941), politician, statesman, Marshal of Poland and Commander-in-Chief of Poland's armed forces
- Ireneusz Roszkowski (1910–1996), gynaecologist
- Irena Sendlerowa (1910–2008), head of Children's Section of the Żegota
- Wacław Sierpiński (1882–1969), mathematician
- Piotr Sobociński (1958–2001), cinematographer
- Witold Sobociński (1929–2018), cinematographer
- Jadwiga Smosarska (1898–1971), actress
- Andrzej Sołtan (1897–1959), physicist
- Zbigniew Ścibor-Rylski (1917–2018), military commander, participant of the Warsaw Uprising
- Michał Karaszewicz-Tokarzewski (1893–1964), general
- Władysław Tryliński (1878–1956), transportation engineer and inventor
- Jerzy Waldorff (1910–1999), art critic and one of the benefactors of the Cemetery
- Melchior Wańkowicz (1892–1974), writer
- Henryk Wieniawski (1835–1870), composer
- Kazimierz Wierzyński (1894–1969), poet and writer
- Stanisław Wigura (1901–1932), aircraft designer and aviator
- Stanisław Wojciechowski (1869–1953), president of Poland
- Aleksander Zelwerowicz (1877–1955), actor and director, patron of the Warsaw Drama Academy
- Franciszek Żwirko (1895–1932), aviator
- Wojciech Żywny (1756–1842), first piano teacher of Fryderyk Chopin, composer.
- Helena Morsztynkiewiczowa (1894–1983), architect and urban planner

== Gallery ==
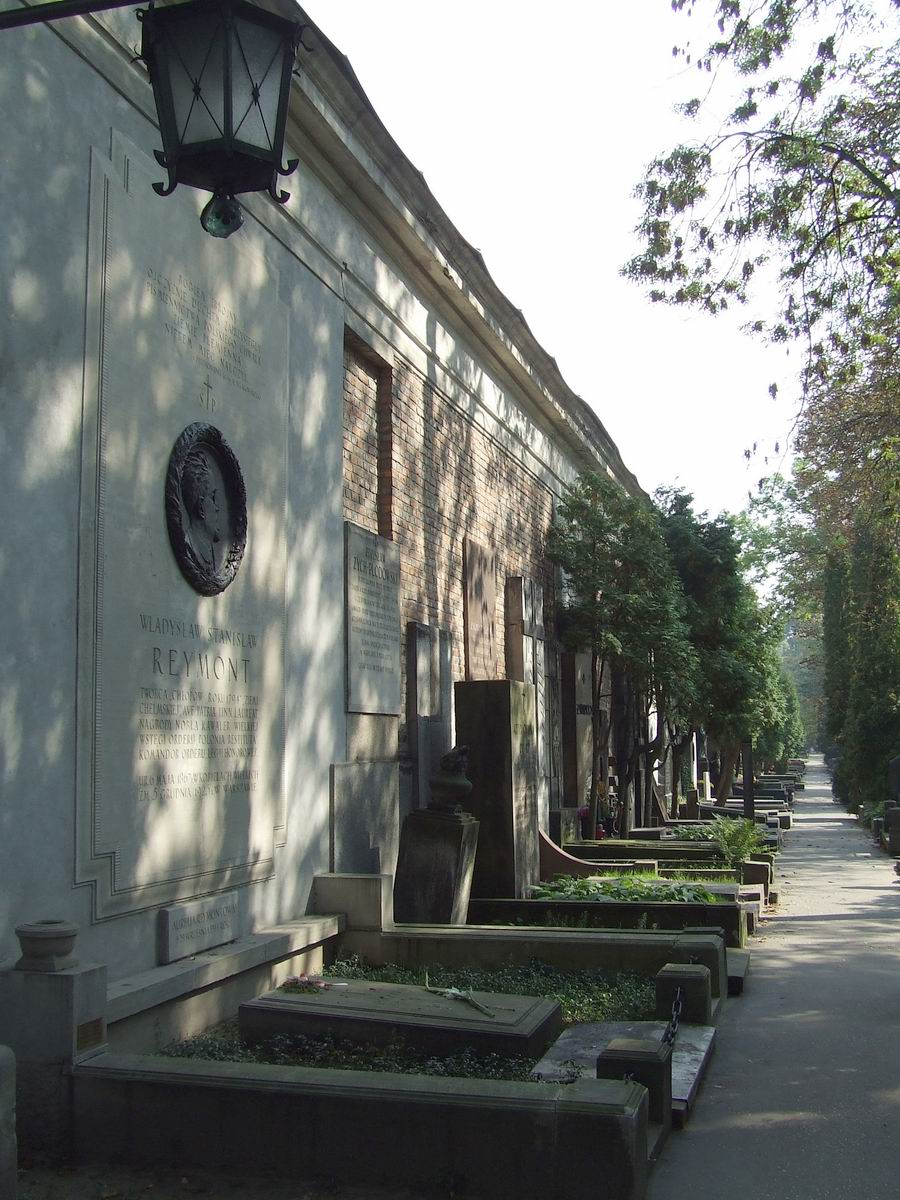
Avenue of Notables

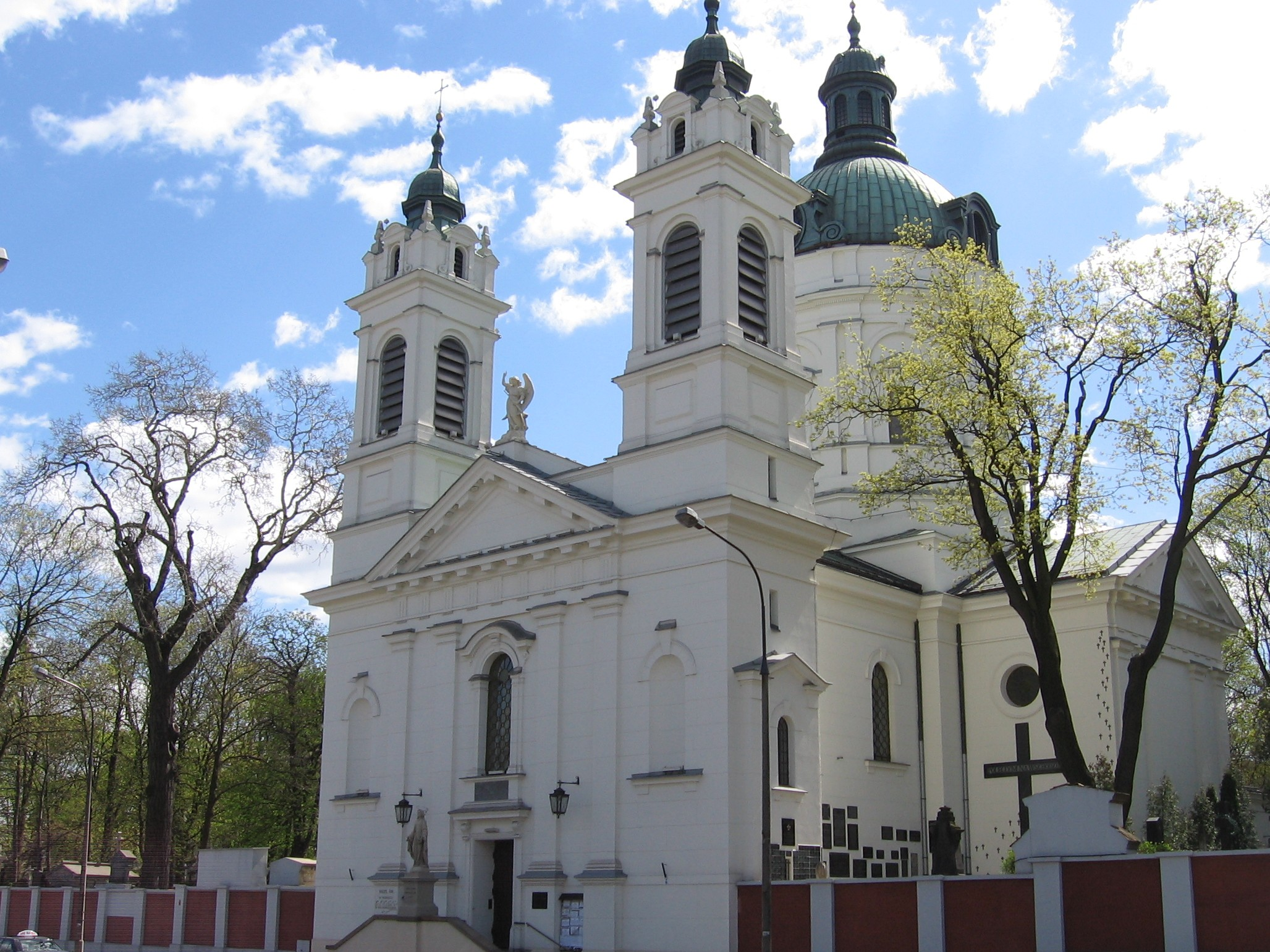
Saint Karol Boromeusz Church

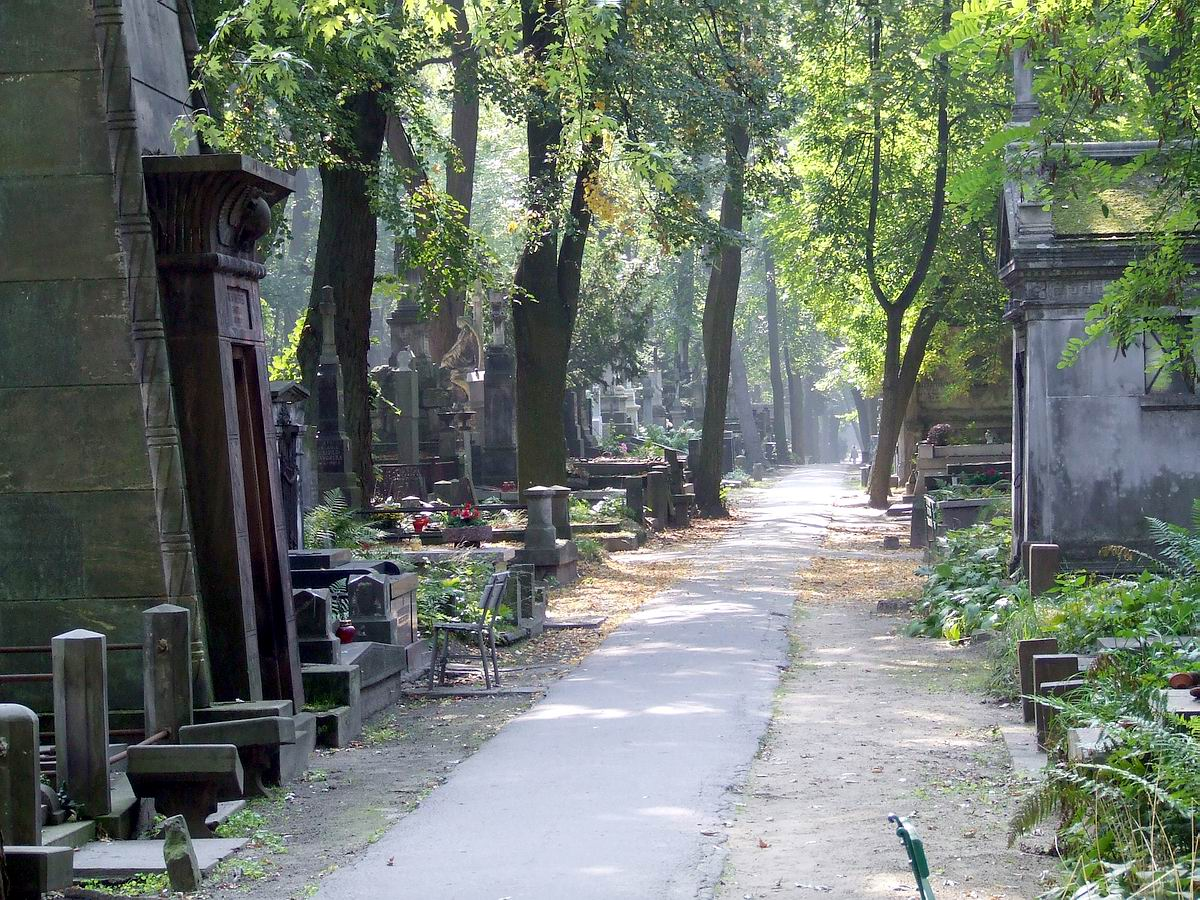
Old Powązki

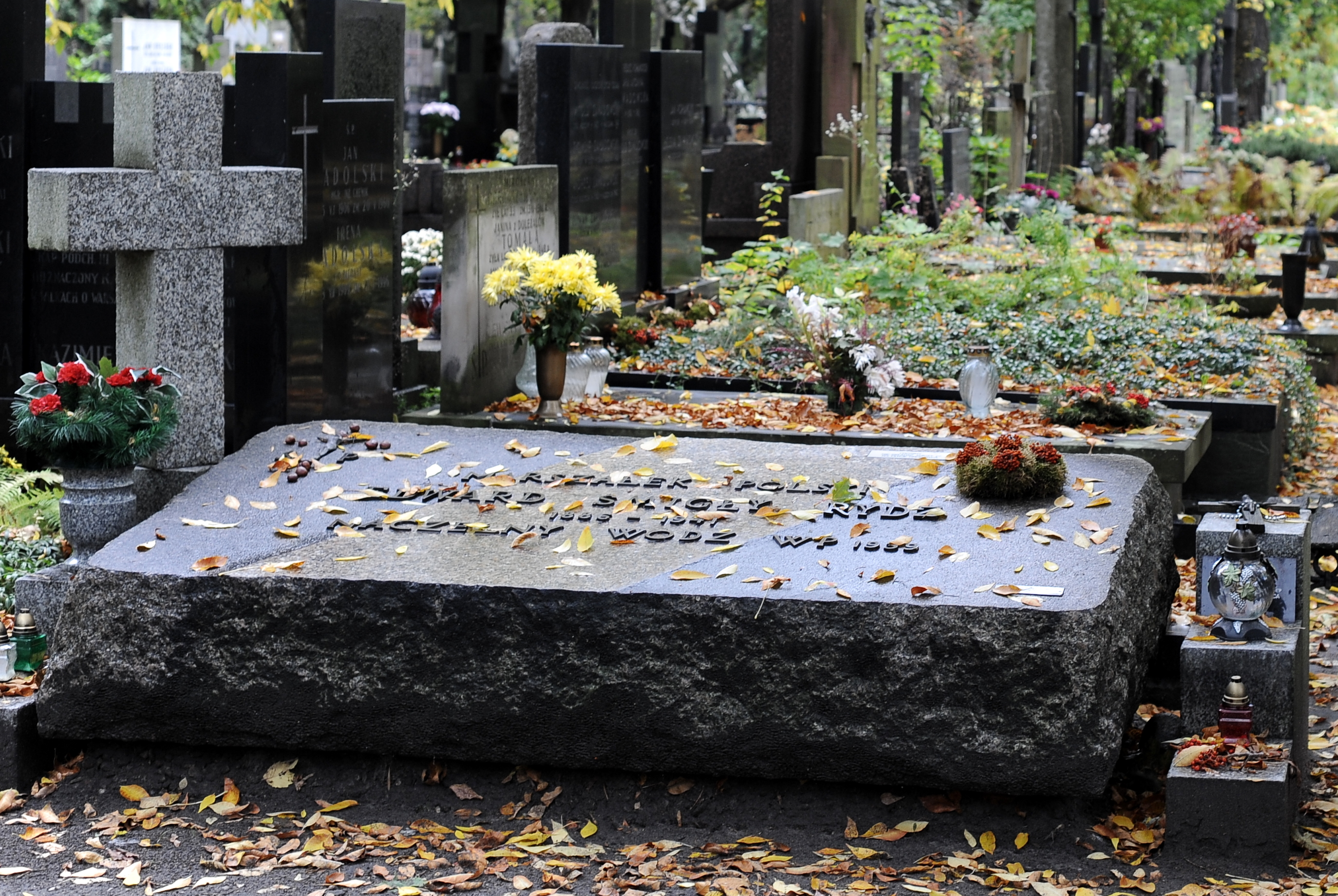
Edward Rydz-Śmigły grave

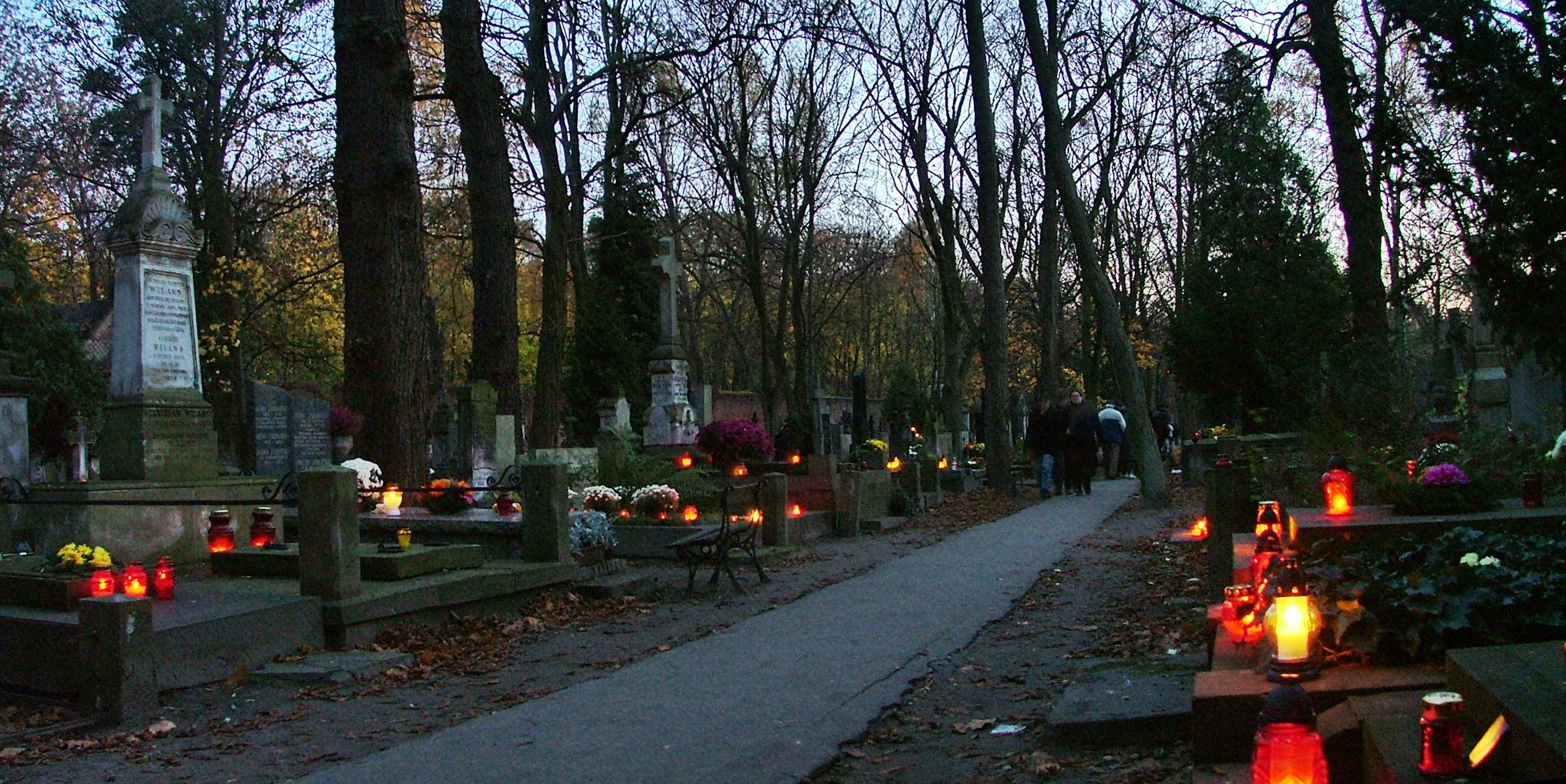
Old Powązki

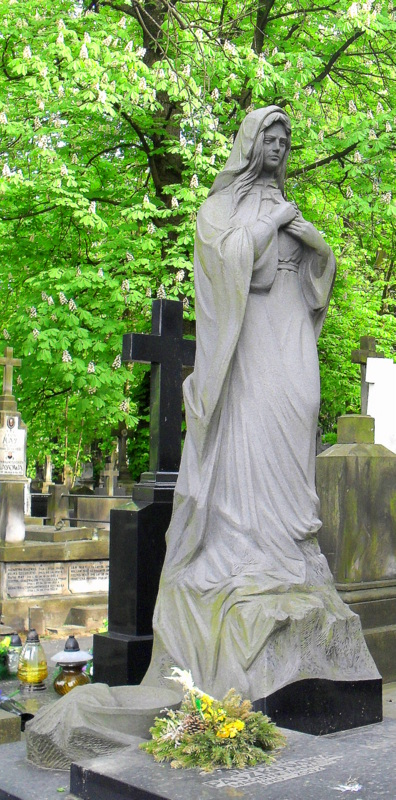
Old Powązki

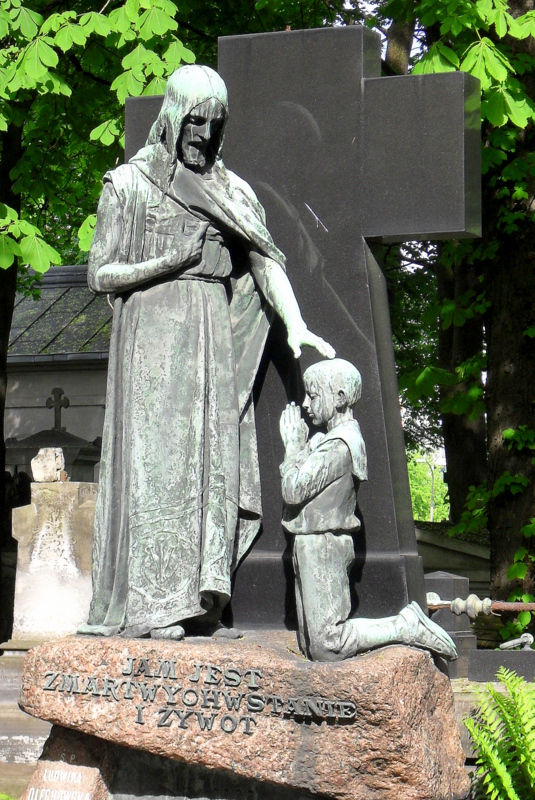
Old Powązki

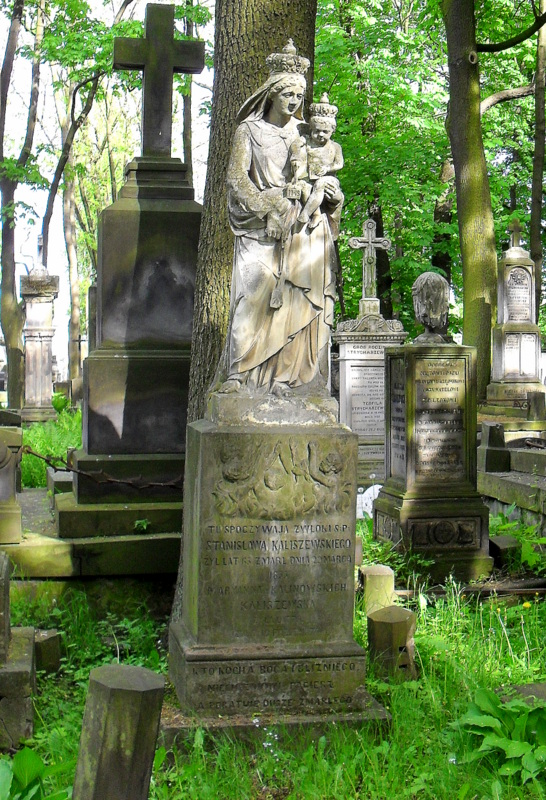
Old Powązki

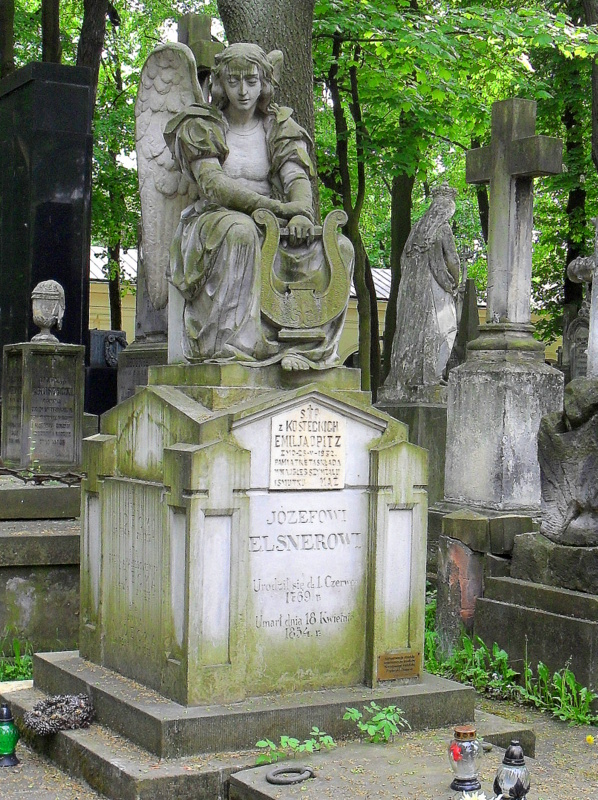
Old Powązki

== See also ==
- Rakowicki Cemetery
- Lychakiv Cemetery
