= Zarzewie =

Polish restorationist organization

Organisation of Independent Youth Zarzewie was a clandestine Polish youth organization, formed in May 1909 in Lemberg, Austrian Galicia. Based on Association of the Polish Youth "Zet", its objective was the restoration of independent Poland. As part of Polish Military Union (Polski Zwiazek Wojskowy), Zarzewie trained recruits for the future Polish Army.

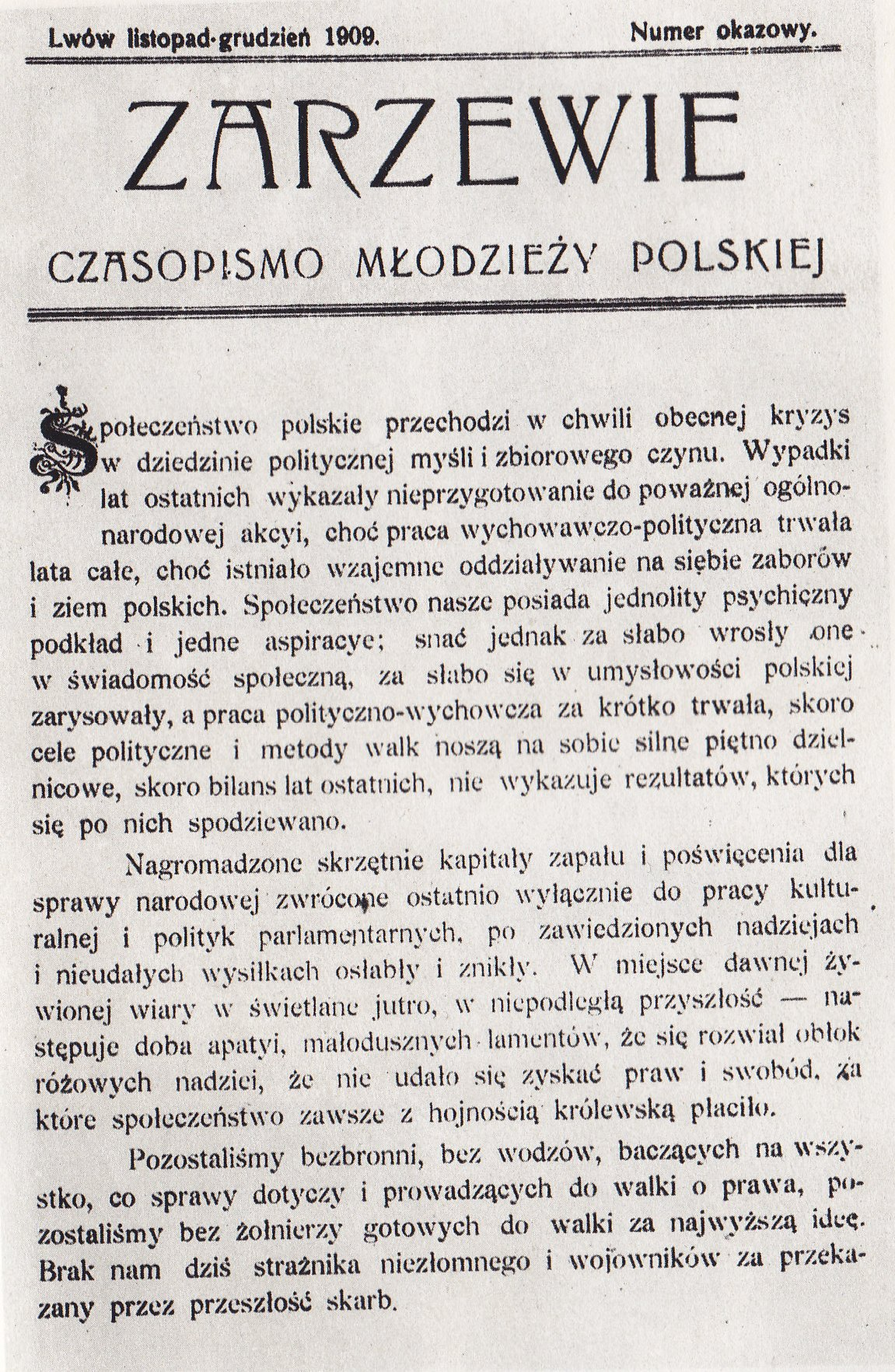
Cover of the first issue of the Zarzewie Magazine

From March until May 1911, Zarzewie, with support of scouting instructor and physician Kazimierz Wyrzykowski, carried out first training course, with emphasis both on physical education and political training (with lectures by Eugeniusz Romer). Meanwhile, Zarzewie formed first cells in Russian-controlled Congress Poland and the Kingdom of Prussia. During World War I, most members of the organization joined Polish Legions in World War I.

Zarzewie was dissolved in February 1920.

== See also ==
- Secret society

== Sources ==
- Garlicka, Aleksandra (red.), Zarzewie 1909-1920 – Wspomnienia i materiały, Instytut Wydawniczy PAX, Warszawa, 1973

== See also ==
- Riflemen's Association
