= Stanisław Janikowski =

Polish Diplomat (1891–1965)

Stanisław Leopold Janikowski
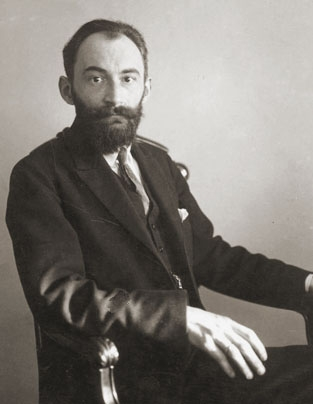
- Born: February 17, 1891; Piotrków Trybunalski, southern Poland
- Died: September 23, 1965 (aged 74); Zielonka, Warsaw, Poland
- Resting place: Powązki Cemetery, Warsaw
- Other name: Wampir
- Occupation: Diplomat
- Known for: Diplomacy and Etruscology
- Spouse: Halina Prewysz-Kwinto (1898-1981) m.1925
- Children: 3: Hanna, Stanisław & Wojciech
- Parent(s): Leopold Janikowski (1855-1942) & Zofia Krajcewicz (1867-1963)

Stanisław Leopold Janikowski (February 17, 1891 – September 23, 1965) was a Polish diplomat and an Etruscologist.

== Biography ==
Stanisław Leopold Janikowski was born in Piotrków, southern Poland, son of Leopold and Zofia (née Krajcewicz). He spent most of his married life in Rome, Italy, until returning to Poland in 1965. On September 23, 1965, he died aged 77 in his parents' home in Zielonka, near Warsaw and is buried in Warsaw.

=== Early life ===
From his school years Stanisław was involved in the underground fighting against the Tsar. His code name in these secret activities was Wampir (English: Vampire). He joined the Revolution with the school strike of 1905 against Russification. He belonged to the Polskie Drużyny Strzeleckie (English: Polish Rifle Squads, a Polish pro-independence paramilitary organization tolerated by the Austrian government in Kraków) and the Polish Sokół movement. Poor Health and the outbreak of World War I meant that he was unable to complete his studies at the Jagiellonian University. Since he could not be accepted by the regular army, during the World War, he was active in the secret Wolnej Szkole Wojskowej (English: Free Cadet School) in Warsaw. From 1914 he was a member of the clandestine Central Committee of ‘ZET’ the Association of the Polish Youth (Polish: Związek Młodzieży Polskiej) and from 1915 in the secret Polska Organizacja Wojskowa (POW - English: Polish Military Organization). From 1918, with former members of ZET who also could no longer be considered to be “youth”, he was a committee member of Związku Patriotycznym (English: Patriotic League) and then with the Związek Naprawy Rzeczpospolitej (English: Union for Improvement of the Republic).

=== Diplomatic career ===
S.L. Janikowski joined the Polish diplomatic service on November 15, 1918. In 1920 he was a member of the Polish delegation to Minsk. In 1921 he took part, as a member of the Polish delegation, in the Peace of Riga negotiations. He then stayed on in Lithuania, leading delicate negotiations to create a majority in the Sejm in Vilnius, supporting policies of the speaker Józef Piłsudski.

After returning to Warsaw he worked for a short time in the Eastern Department of the Ministry of Foreign Affairs of the Republic of Poland. In 1927 he took office as Counsellor in the Embassy of the Second Polish Republic to the Holy See.

After the death of Ambassador Władysław Skrzyński in 1937, Janikowski performed his duties, as charge d'affaires, at the Holy See, until the 1939 arrival of the new Ambassador Kazimierz Papée.

=== World War II ===
On the outbreak of World War II and the internment of the Polish authorities, Janikowski was designated to prime position by the nominated President of the Second Polish Republic General Bolesław Wieniawa-Długoszowski.

From 1944 until July 7, 1945, he acted as director of the Embassy of the Second Polish Republic to the Quirinale with the title of Minister Plenipotentiary. He continued to co-operate with Kazimierz Papée, though he was not formally mentioned in the Annuario Pontificio.

=== Post War ===
From January to May 1954 he stayed in London, where he held the post of Minister of Foreign Affairs in the Polish Government in Exile of Jerzy Hryniewski. On his return to Rome, Janikowski took up radio broadcasting. In 1965 he returned to Poland with his wife and settled in Zielonka, (in the road named after his father, the explorer Leopold Janikowski), near Warsaw, where he died a few months later on September 23, 1965. He was buried on September 27, 1965 - Melchior Wańkowicz gave a funeral oration - in the family grave in Powązki Cemetery in Warsaw.

=== Family ===
Stanisław Janikowski was the only child of Leopold (1855 – December 8, 1942) and Zofia Krajcewicz (November 21, 1867 – April 26, 1963). Leopold Janikowski was a Meteorologist by training, becoming an Ethnographer and travelling to the Camerouns in West Africa on two voyages in the 1880s.

Stanisław met his future wife Halina Prewysz-Kwinto during his stay in Wilno, and they later married in 1925. She was born on September 23, 1898, at Lipniszki, in Lithuania. They had three children. Their daughter was Hanna Maria, born July 21, 1926, in Warsaw, who married Edward Szczepanik in Rome on June 29, 1946. She had 4 children and lived in London, Hong Kong, Rome and latterly Lewes, East Sussex, England. She died on December 23, 1995.

Their first son Stanisław Maria was born in Rome on November 28, 1927. After the war he settled in England, where he still lives, in Felixstowe, and married Bridget Harkin, from Ireland, having a daughter.

The last son, Wojciech Ignacjy Maria, was born July 31, 1935, in Wilno, Lithuania. He has spent all his life in Rome, Italy, with two sons.

Halina died in Zielonka, Warsaw, on December 18, 1981, 16 years after her husband Stanisław Leopold Janikowski.
