= Tomasz Knapik =

Polish film, radio and television reader (1943–2021)

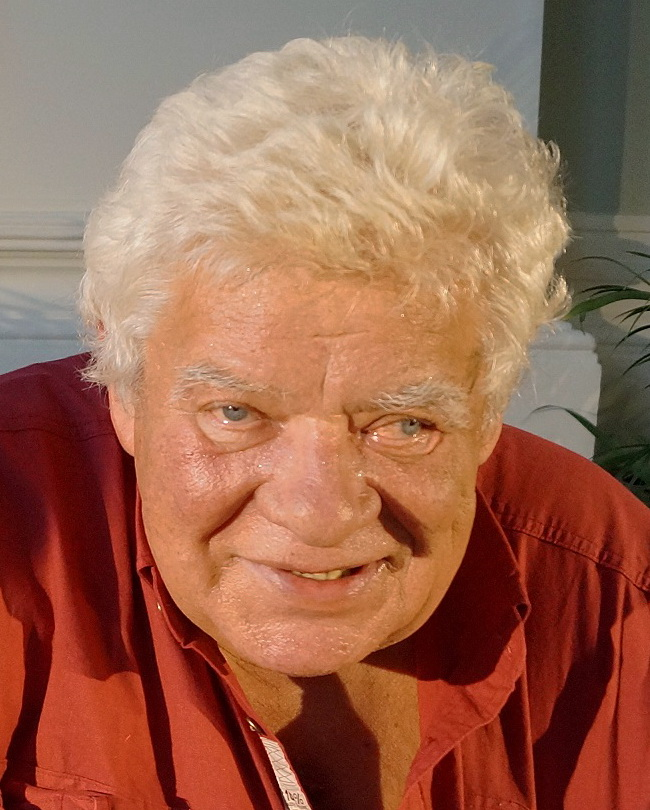
- Knapik in 2018
- Born: 16 September 1943; Warsaw, German-occupied Poland
- Died: 6 September 2021 (aged 77); Bielawa, Poland
- Resting place: Powązki Cemetery
- Education: Warsaw University of Technology
- Occupations: Film, radio and television reader

Tomasz Knapik (16 September 1943 – 6 September 2021) was a Polish film, radio and television voice-over translation artist (known as lektor in Polish). He held a doctorate in electrical engineering and also served as a lecturer at the Faculty of Transport of the Warsaw University of Technology. He was widely regarded as a legend in the field of voice-over translation in Poland.

== Career ==
He embarked on his media career at the radio station Rozgłośnia Harcerska. Subsequently, he was involved with Polish Radio (predominantly with Trójka) and Telewizja Polska (TVP). During his tenure at TVP, he provided live voice-overs for foreign films and materials for Telewizyjny Kurier Warszawski. At the onset of the 1990s, amidst the burgeoning videotape industry in Poland, he lent his voice to numerous films distributed by both official and pirated companies. Among his repertoire were many action cinema classics, as well as numerous B-class and C-class movies. He was a regular collaborator with several Polish distributors, including Imperial, Vision, Best Film, NVC VIM, ITI Home Video, Artvision, and many others.

In 1995, he secured a permanent position with Polsat television, where he became the primary voice-over artist, reading nearly all films, series, and promotional trailers for the station. In 1996, he resumed work with Polonia 1, providing voice-overs for programs such as Pełnym gazem, Escape, Nie tylko na weekend, and Fachowiec radzi.

By 2005, he was one of the principal voice-over artists for films and series on Tele 5. In the same year, he voiced the controversial Heyah mobile advertisements. He also contributed to various political advertisements, including those for the contentious National Revival of Poland. Between 2005 and 2007, he narrated the Kronika filmowa program on TVN24. In 2006, he co-hosted the TV program Re on TVP1. He also served as a narrator for the program Uwaga! Pirat on TVN Turbo and Stop drogówka on TV4.

In 2008, he recorded voice messages for the passenger information system of Warsaw's Public Transport Authority, providing route announcements.

In 2013, he made appearances in two comedy skits on the program Dzięki Bogu już weekend on TVP2. In September 2014, he guest-starred in the 46th episode of its Retro series.

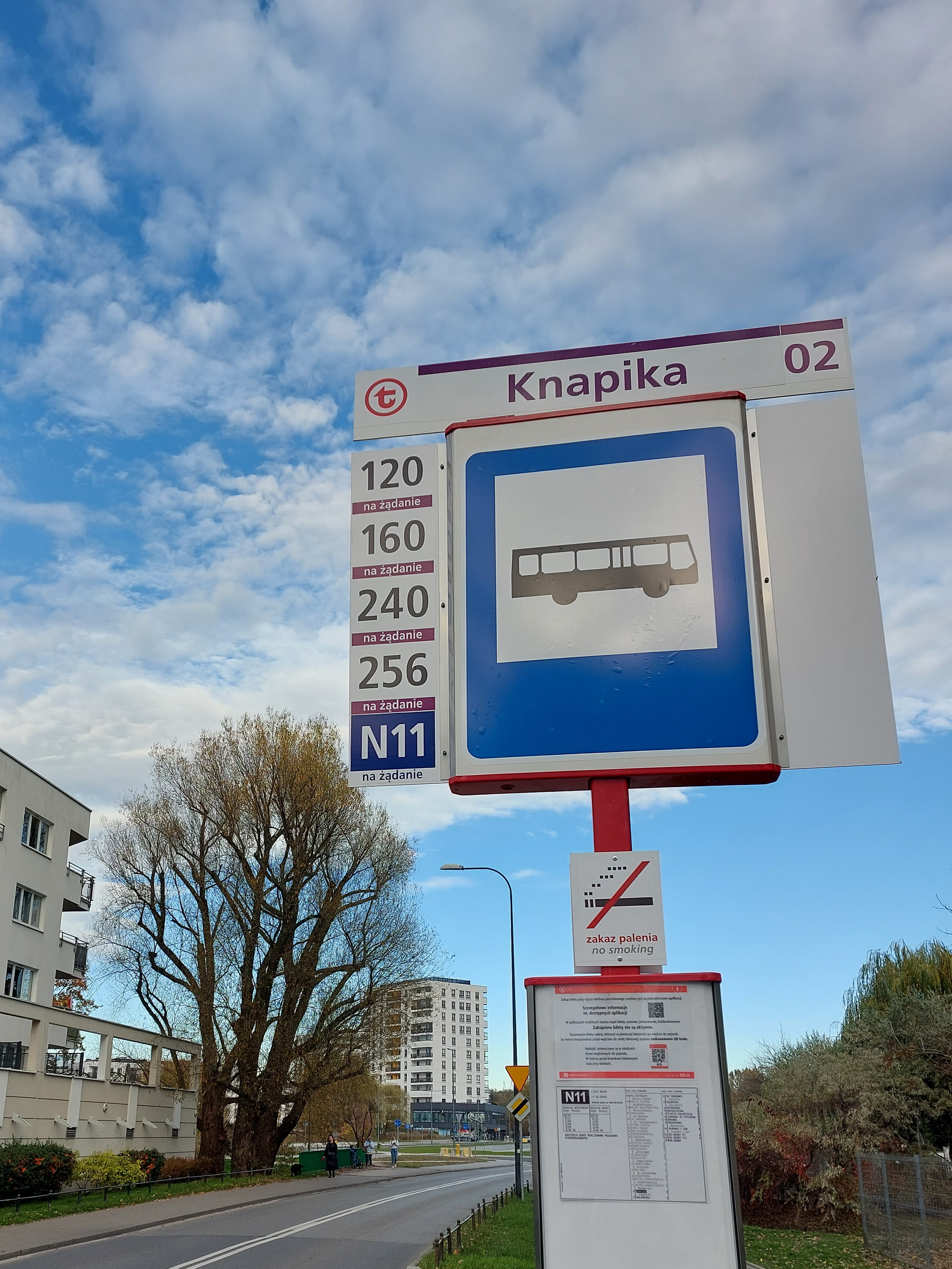
"Knapika" bus stop in Warsaw (2022)

== Personal life ==
His son, Maciej Knapik, is a television journalist.

== Death ==
He died on 6 September 2021 at the age of 77. On 13 September 2021, his ashes were interred in the family grave at Powązki Cemetery. In October 2022, a bus stop in Warsaw Bródno was named in his honor.
