= Aleksey Mikhalyov (translator) =

Russian television dubber (1944–1994)

Aleksey Mikhaylovich Mikhalyov (Russian: Алексе́й Миха́йлович Михалёв; 26 December 1944 – 9 December 1994) was a Russian translator and home video voice-over translator from English. Among numerous films and animated cartoons translated by him into Russian are Star Wars, The Jungle Book, The Witches of Eastwick, Apocalypse Now, Pretty Woman and The Silence of the Lambs. Subsequently the Alexey Mikhalyov Prize for best Russian film translation was established.

Mikhalyov had also translated William Faulkner, John Steinbeck's East of Eden, Muriel Spark's The Prime of Miss Jean Brodie, J. M. Coetzee and other authors.

== Life ==
Aleksey Mikhalyov was born in the family of a journalist and the ballet dancer Zoya Mikhalyova. Having graduated from the Institute of Asian and African Countries at the Moscow State University, Mikhalyov worked as a translator in Afghanistan. Fluent in Persian, he then arrived to Iran, where he established a friendly relations with Shah Mohammad Reza Pahlavi.

Subsequently, Mikhalyov became a personal translator of Leonid Brezhnev. At one meeting Brezhnev introduced Mikhalyov to a certain official with "this is our young communist Aleksey Mihalyov". Mikhalyov easily countered: "I'm not a communist". Nonetheless Brezhnev said: "Admit [him] urgently". Mikhalyov ultimately entered the USSR Union of Writers and the Union of Cinematographers. The experts called his voicing-over "a film with Mikhalyov performance". Mikhalyov was acquainted with eminent Azeri singer Muslim Magomayev, who had gathered a vast collection of films, translated by Mikhalyov.

Mikhalyov died from leukemia at the age of forty-nine.
