= Talovka =

Talovka Таловка
- Village
- Location within Altai Krai Location within Russia
- Coordinates: 51°26′N 81°54′E
- Country: Russia
- Region: Altai Krai
- District: Zmeinogorsky District
- Time zone: UTC+7:00

Talovka (Russian: Таловка) is a rural locality (a selo) and the administrative center of Talovsky Selsoviet of Zmeinogorsky District, Altai Krai, Russia. The population was 169 as of 2016. There are 7 streets.

== Geography ==
Talovka is located on the bank of the Talovka River, 49 km northwest of Zmeinogorsk (the district's administrative centre) by road. Nikolsk is the nearest rural locality.

== Ethnicity ==
The village is inhabited by Russians and others.
