= Przegląd Mechaniczny =

Przegląd Mechaniczny (Mechanical Review) is a monthly magazine published in the Polish language since 1933, intended for the engineering community and covering the machine and equipment building industry. The scope of subjects covered by the monthly includes design, testing and operation of machines and equipment, including CAD/CAM issues, material engineering, new manufacturing techniques, organization of production, diagnostic methods, reliability issues.

Since 24 January 2001, it has been published by the Institute of Mechanised Construction and Rock Mining (Instytut Mechanizacji Budownictwa i Górnictwa Skalnego). Earlier (both before and after the Second World War, the magazine was issued by the Association of Polish Mechanics and Engineers (SIMP). In the 1930s, Colonel Stanisław Witkowski was the chairman of the board of "Przegląd Mechaniczny".
