= Mieczysław Wolfke =

Polish physicist (1883–1947)

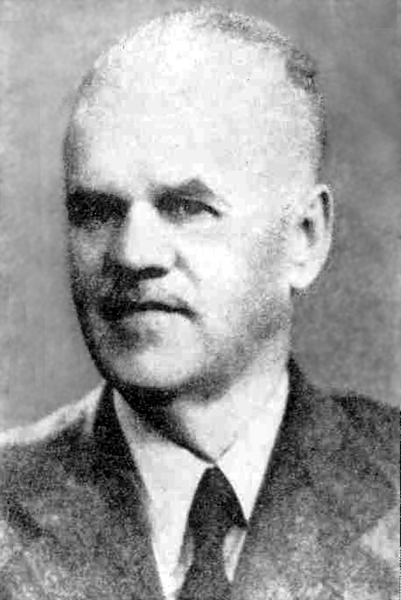
- Born: 29 May 1883; Łask, Congress Poland, Russian Empire
- Died: 4 May 1947 (aged 63); Zurich, Switzerland
- Education: University of Wrocław
- Occupations: Physicist, inventor
- Known for: Pioneer of holography and television
- Scientific career
- Workplaces: University of Zurich; Warsaw University of Technology
- Thesis: Resolving Power of Optical Systems (1910)
- Doctoral advisor: Otto Lummer

Mieczysław Władysław Wolfke (Polish: [mjɛˈt͡ʂɨswaf ˈvɔlfkɛ]; 29 May 1883 – 4 May 1947) was a Polish physicist, professor at the Warsaw University of Technology, the forerunner of holography and television. He discovered the method of solidification of helium as well as two types of liquid helium. He was a Masonic Grand Master of the National Grand Lodge of Poland from 1931 to 1934. He served as president of the Polish Physical Society between 1930 and 1934.

== Life and career ==
Mieczysław Wolfke was born on 29 May 1883 in Łask near Łódź, then part of Congress Poland, to Karol Juliusz Wolfke, a road engineer and Lucyna (née Kośmińska).

In 1892, Wolfke and his parents moved to Częstochowa where his father became a district roadside engineer. Inspired by the works of Jules Verne and Camille Flammarion, at the age of 12, he wrote a dissertation about interplanetary travelling (especially to the Moon). It contained the theory of spaceships driven by the jet force. He also presented scientific hypotheses supported by mathematical models.

During his time in Częstochowa, Wolfke completed five years of the gymnasium for boys. Then he continued his education in Realschule in Sosnowiec which he graduated in 1902. At the age of 17, Wolfke developed a device which he called "telektroskop" (telectrosope). This invention was used to send images at a distance via electromagnetic waves. It was a prototype of television and he patented it in Russia and Germany. This patent received appreciation at the exhibition of the Polytechnic Society in Lviv in 1902 and earned him recognition in the world.

In 1902, Wolfke moved to Leodium, Belgium to start studying at the university. Because of the low standard of laboratories and inadequate equipment, he went to Sorbonne in Paris. In Paris, he became acquainted with ideas of Freemasonry. In 1907, he failed the bachelor's exam and moved to Wroclaw (at that time in Germany). He entered the University of Breslau and in 1910 he earned his doctorate on the basis of his dissertation entitled Zdolność rozdzielcza układów optycznych (Resolving Power of Optical Systems). Professor Otto Lummer was his supervisor. After the annulment of his first marriage, in March 1912 he married Agnes Erica Ritzmann.

After the patent of the cadmium-mercury lamp, which he and Karl Ritzmann (in the next years his brother-in-law) received in 1909, Wolfke was employed at the Carl Zeiss Company in Jena. However, working in the industry did not match his ambitions, in 1912 he went to Karlsruhe, where he worked as an assistant of professor Otto Lehmann at the Faculty of Physics at the local Polytechnic for four months. Soon after that, he moved to Zurich, where on 26 May 1913 he received a habilitation at the ETH Zurich (his reviewers were Albert Einstein and Pierre Weiss), and in the next year – at the kantonal University of Zurich (his reviewers were Max von Laue and Alfred Kleiner). During his time at ETH, he became acquainted with Gabriel Narutowicz, one of the faculty deans of the university and a future President of Poland. Until the end of his period in Zurich, he lectured at both of these universities. He also worked for Carl Zeiss and Brown Boveri, but he consistently rejected any propositions of permanent and well-paid jobs in the industry. In 1915, his son Karol was born, and in 1918 his daughter Lucyna was born.

After the restoration of Poland's independence in 1918, Wolfke obtained a Polish passport. In 1920 he received a proposal to take the position of professor at the University of Warsaw and accepted the nomination, but due to the financial problems and the lack of a laboratory, he did not undertake this job. In 1921, he obtained a successive habilitation at the University of Zurich. His reviewers were Edgar Meyer and Erwin Schrödinger.

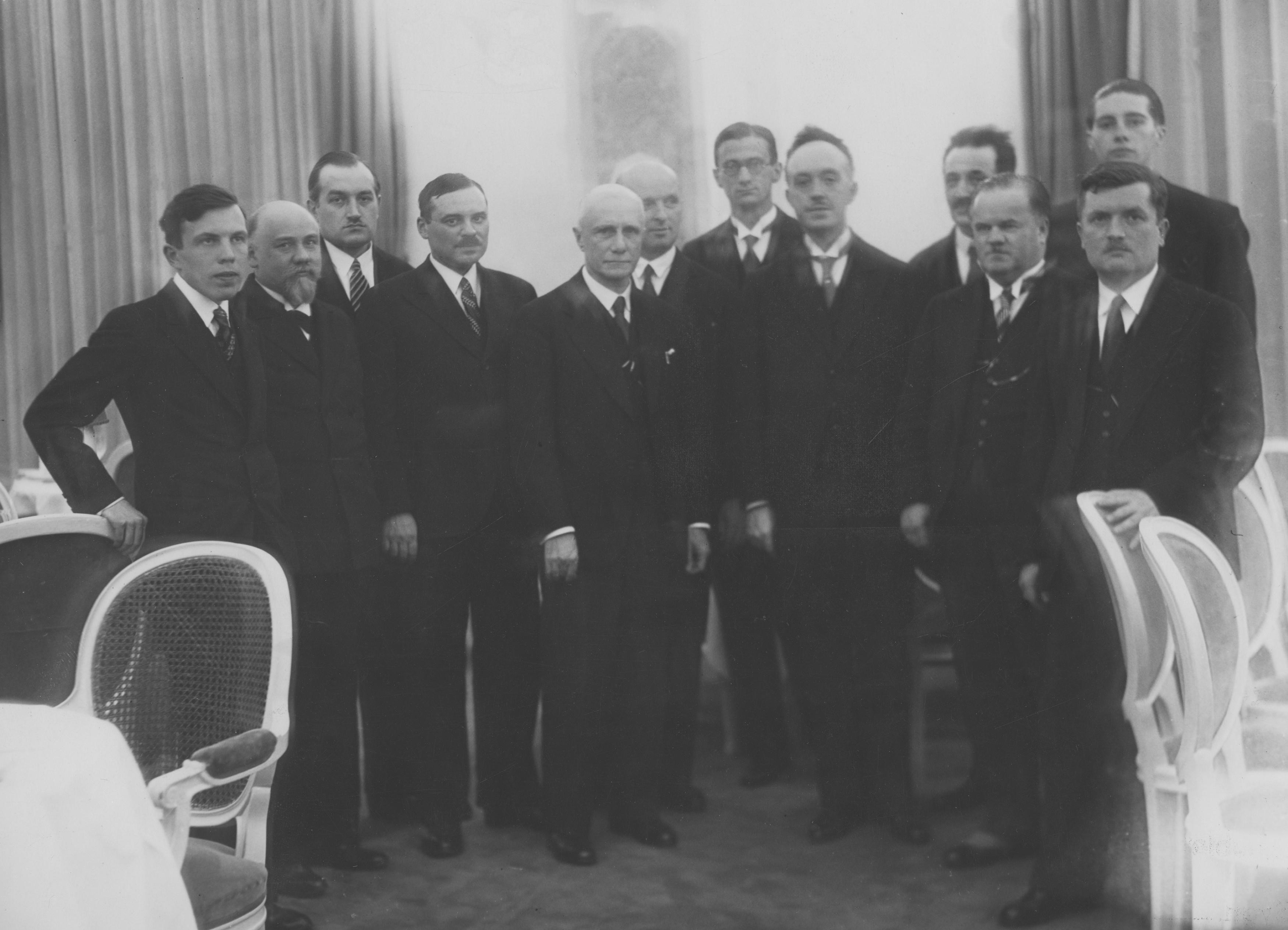
Wolfke (third from left) during Louis de Broglie's visit in Warsaw, 1935

In 1922, Wolfke was appointed to a position of professor at the Warsaw University of Technology and returned to Poland. At the Warsaw University of Technology, he led the Department of Physics on the Faculty of Electrotechnics. In 1924, he published his work entitled Zasady teorji ciepła (Rules of the Theory of Heat), the first modern Polish textbook on thermodynamics for university students.

In 1926, his second son, Stefan Wolfke, was born.

In the early 1930s, Wolfke started to organize the Low Temperatures Institute. Thanks to his initiatives and international contacts, the Warsaw University of Technology became one of the leading centers of research into low temperature physics in Central Europe. In 1938, he took part in the organization of the flight of Polish stratospheric balloon called "Star of Poland". The first flight was unsuccessful and the second one was precluded by the outbreak of World War II.

After the beginning of the World War II, Wolfke was arrested (10th November 1939), sent to Pawiak where he spent a week in cell number 49. After his release and with the agreement of the occupier, he managed the Research Department of Technical Physics and then lectured at the Higher State Technical School created in polytechnic buildings. He also organized support for the conspiracy and participated in underground teaching.

In May 1944, Mieczysław's daughter Lucyna Rassalska died.

Warsaw Uprising separated Wolfke from his family. He moved to Kraków, while his wife, son-in-law and grandson stayed in Warsaw until the end of the uprising. After the end of it, they were resettled to Kraków. Wolfke's sons stayed in camps in Germany until the end of the war . In 1944, he married Krystyna Chądzyńska in Kraków.

After the end of military actions, Wolfke took part in the reconstruction of Polish science. He lectured at the University of Mining and Metallurgy in Kraków and at the Gdansk University of Technology. He was also involved in the formation of the Silesian University of Technology in Gliwice. In December 1945, he returned to Warsaw where he started to organize the Faculty of Physics at Warsaw University of Technology. At the time of reconstruction of the Faculty of Physics (building was destroyed during the Warsaw Uprising) Wolfke was delegated to foreign scientific centers to acquire the knowledge about an actual situation of world's scientific research, first to Stockholm and then to Zurich.

On 4 May 1947, Wolfke died suddenly of hear attack in Zurich and was buried at Sihlfeld cemetery.

== Scientific activities ==
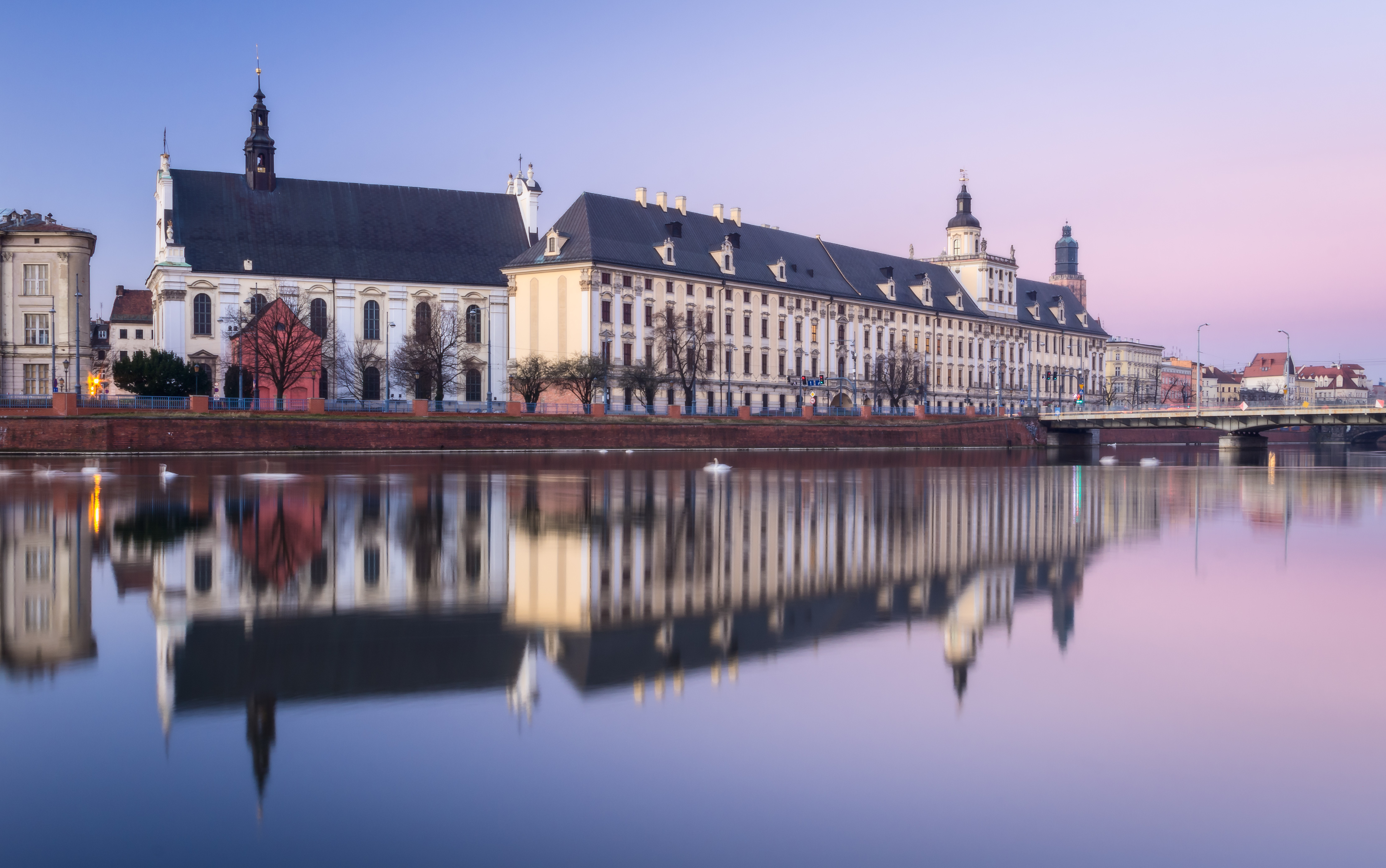
The main building of the University of Wrocław where Wolfke studied physics.

Wolfke became interested in science at an early age. In 1895, he wrote "Planetostat" – a dissertation about interplanetary communication, and in 1901 – "Abstraktyka" – a philosophical dissertation about "science of science". However, these treatises were only in the form of manuscripts. In 1898, he devised and patented a telectroscope. It was based on modified, rotating Nipkow disk, photosensitive selenium electrode and Geissler tube with brightness modulation. Wolfke was inspired by Jan Szczepanik's telectroscope, invented a few years earlier, but his project was an improved version, which was wireless and using electromagnetic waves. Two years later he devised a mathematical theory of surface displacements on a plane.

His first science publication: "Electron, considered as a center of pressure in ether" was written in 1907 in Paris. In the same year he had a presentation in the Astronomical Society in Paris about the idea of a telescope with a concave mirror – it was giving larger magnification than before. In recognition the Society invited him to participate in it.

After arrival to Wrocław, Wolfke invented in 1908 a cathode tube with a glass window, and in 1909 with Karl Ritzmann he patented a cadmium-mercury lamp. He later sold his rights to it to the Carl-Zeiss Jena company, where he worked for a year after obtaining his doctorate. At University of Wrocław in the Otto Lummer’s team Wolfke worked at the generalization of the Abbe’s theory of optical imaging for non-linear gratings. In 1910, he obtained the degree of Doctor of Philosophy for his dissertation about the resolving power of optical systems on example of microscope. Despite many great scientific achievements in his later years, Wolfke judged its content the most valuable.

During his years in Zurich, Wolfke was a member of a narrow group of physicists who created the paths of the world physics. In 1916, he started to study subject of Anode rays and – in 1917 – melting of tungsten (together with Gmür e CO company) and also on mercury Rectifiers. One year later his interests changed to carbon lamps, tungsten smelting and nitrogen combustion. At this time he also published a dissertation "Über die Möglichkeit der optischen Abbildung von Molekulargittern" – (About a possibility of optical imaging of molecular gratings) – the world's first concept of holography and the second of the achievements cherished the most by himself. This thesis refers to Wolfke's stay in Karlsruhe in 1912, where he was an assistant to Professor Otto Lehmann – a physicist known as the father of Liquid crystals. In his laboratory Wolfke noticed that it was possible to first record the image on a photographic plate by illuminating the X-ray crystal and then read it with the use of additional optical unit and visible light. Dennis Gabor, during his Nobel lecture said: “I did not know at that time, and neither did Bragg, that Wolfke had proposed this method in 1920, but without realizing it experimentally”.

In 1922, after returning to Poland, Wolfke took up the problem of low temperatures. In 1924, Józef Wierusz-Kowalski – physicist, professor at the Warsaw University of Technology and from 1921 – Polish ambassador in the Hague – offered him a trip to Leiden and cooperation with the Institute of Low Temperatures in Leiden, where professor H. K. Kamerlingh-Onnes and (later) Willem Keesom studied the dielectric constant of liquid helium at various temperatures. The theoretical experiments led him to the discovery of two liquid phases of helium and solidification of helium what Wolfke considered as the third of his greatest achievements. In the early 1930s, he started to organize the separated Institute of Low Temperatures at Warsaw University of Technology, even running the first installation.

In 1927, Wolfke worked on the liquid helium dielectric constant and in the next year on the association in liquid dielectrics. He also started cooperation with the Polish Army in Temporary Advisory and Scientific Committee and created many inventions for the soldiers.

In 1930, he presented the theory of multiple associations. He also conducted the research on the point of change in the liquid phase and worked on the experimental finding of light molecules. Einstein mentioned his work at the Berlin Academy of Science.

In 1936, he checked the electric conductivity of liquid helium and started to organize the institute of low temperature at the Warsaw University of Technology. He also worked on the magnetocalorimetric of liquid helium.

In 1937, he found the direct evidence of fulfilment of the law of "action and reaction" for the electrical circuit of any shape. In 1938, he made his final measurements of magnetostriction of liquid oxygen and began researching autoprotonal discharges from palladium hydrogenated anodes.

All Wolfke's plans were crossed by the World War II. From his Institute the German soldiers stole the lab equipment. During the occupation, Wolfke led the Research Institute of Technical Physics at the Warsaw University of Technology (which was controlled by the occupier) and had lectures at the Higher State Technical School. He also organized support for the conspiracy and participated in the underground teaching.

Before the war, in May 1939, Wolfke wrote an article Eksplozja atomów (Explosion of Atoms) in the magazine "Polish Armed Forces", which was a warning against Nuclear weapons, and in 1945 he wrote a book entitled Atomic Bomb, considered among the first popular science works in Poland devoted to nuclear physics.

During his life he had many opened lectures which were very popular and gathered many listeners.

== Organizations ==
Wolfke belonged to many different organizations and associations, including: Prussian Academy of Sciences, Academy of Technical Sciences, Commission of the International Institute of Refrigeration, Warsaw Scientific Society, Polish Physical Society, Polish Academy of Learning in Kraków, Deutsche Physikalische Gesellschaft, Warsaw Polytechnic Society, Polish Society of Scientific Expeditions, International Cryogenic Commission, French Physical Society, Swiss Physical Society, Polish National Committee of the International Physical Society, Physical Education and Applied Sciences Committee, YMCA and the Grand National Assembly.

== Awards and honors ==
In 1933, Wolfke was decorated the Commander's Cross of the Order of Polonia Restituta for his contributions to the development of science.

A memorial bench dedicated to Wolfke was erected in the courtyard of the Warsaw University of Technology, where in 2022 a conference about the life and work of Wolfke, atternded by his son Karol, was held. In an effort to restore the memory and deserved recognition of the scientist, the year 2022 was announced as the "Year of Mieczysław Wolfke" by the Polish scientific community including the Warsaw University of Technology, the Polish Physical Society, the Physics Committee of the Polish Academy of Sciences, and the Polish Photonics Society.
