= Temporary Advisory and Scientific Committee =

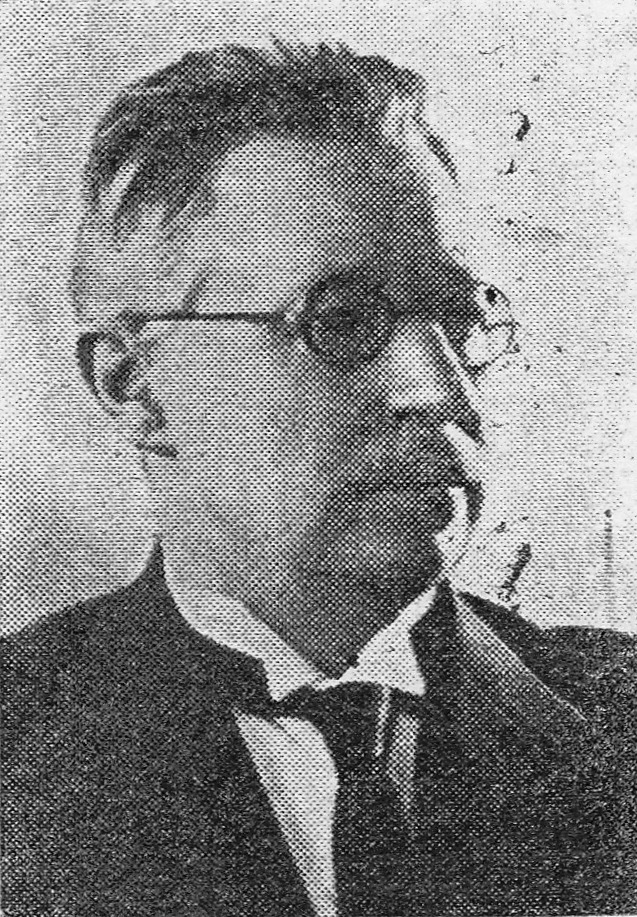
Wojciech Świętosławki - Polish physical chemist, chairman of the TKDN, later cabinet minister

Temporary Advisory and Scientific Committee (Polish: Tymczasowy Komitet Doradczo-Naukowy, TKDN) was established in 1933 under the patronage of the Ministry of Military Affairs in Poland. It was one of the first attempts in pre-Second World War Poland to institutionalise the army’s cooperation with the scientific community in order to increase the country's military and economic potential. The following eminent scientists participated in the work of the TKDN: Janusz Groszkowski, Maksymilian Huber, Stanisław Pawłowski, Mieczysław Pożaryski, Antoni Roman, Bohdan Stefanowski, Wojciech Świętosławski, Czesław Witoszyński, Mieczysław Wolfke and in 1936 Kazimierz Smoleński. The liaison officers of the Ministry of Military Affairs included: Col. Zagrodzki, MD, Col. Stanisław Witkowski, Dipl.Eng, (Head of the War Industry Bureau), and Lt. Col. Leopold Gebel, (Deputy Head of the Army Administration Office, secretary to the TKDN).

An increasingly turbulent situation in Europe necessitated the development of new weapons and equipment for the army. The scope of TKDN's work was very broad, ranging from upgrading existing weapons to experimental technologies (e.g. the electric rifle)

The TKDN existed until the late 1930s.
