= Ebulliometer =

Instrument for measuring a liquid's boiling point

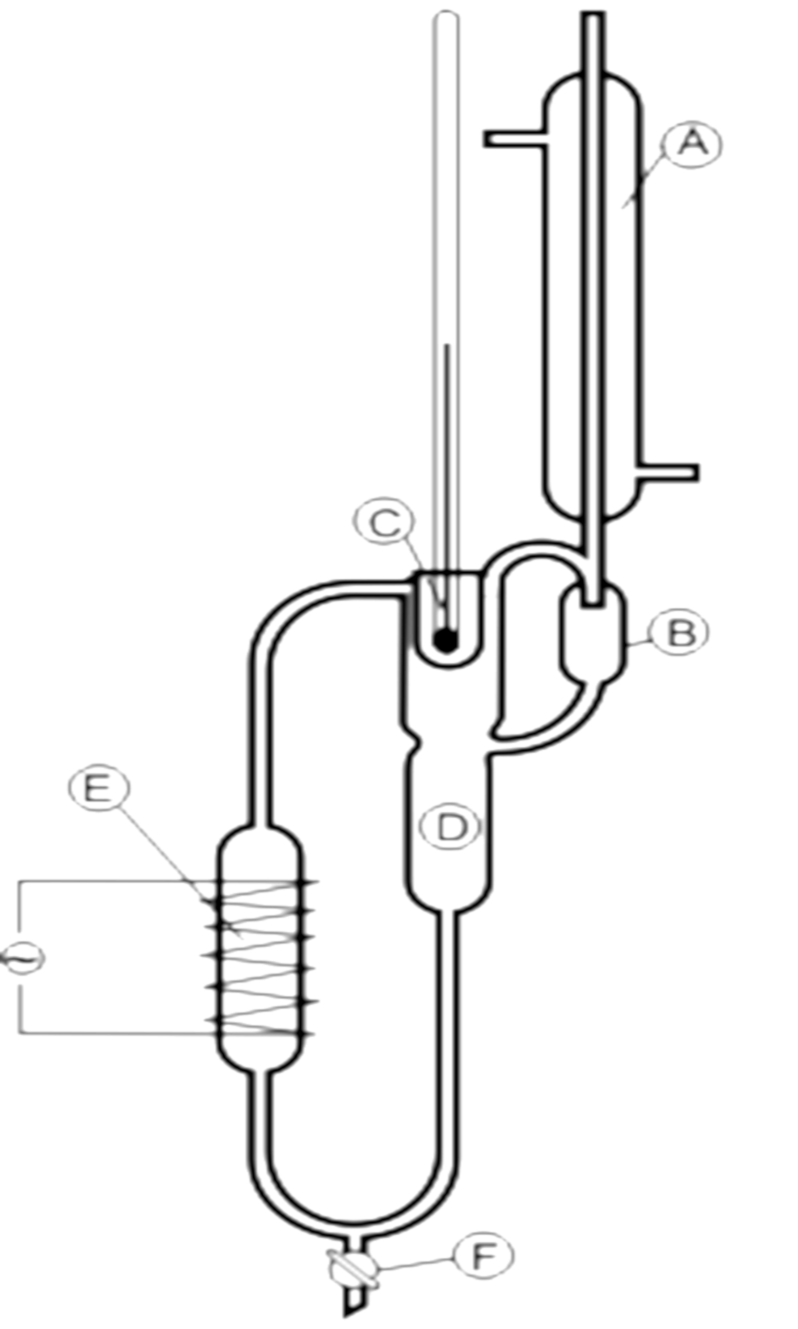
Ebulliometer of Świętosławski

In physics, an ebulliometer (from Latin ēbullīre 'to boil') is an instrument designed to accurately measure the boiling point of liquids by measuring the temperature of the vapor–liquid equilibrium either isobarically (at constant pressure) or isothermally (at constant temperature).

The primary components in a Świętosławski ebulliometer, which operates isobarically, are the boiler, the Cottrell pumps, the thermowell, and the condenser. Such an ebulliometer can be used for extremely accurate measurements of boiling temperature, molecular weights, mutual solubilities, and solvent purities by using a resistance thermometer (RTD) to measure the near-equilibrium conditions of the thermowell.

The ebulliometer is frequently used for measuring the alcohol content of dry wines. See also Sweetness of wine and Oechsle scale.
