= Wojciech Świętosławski =

Polish chemist (1881–1968)

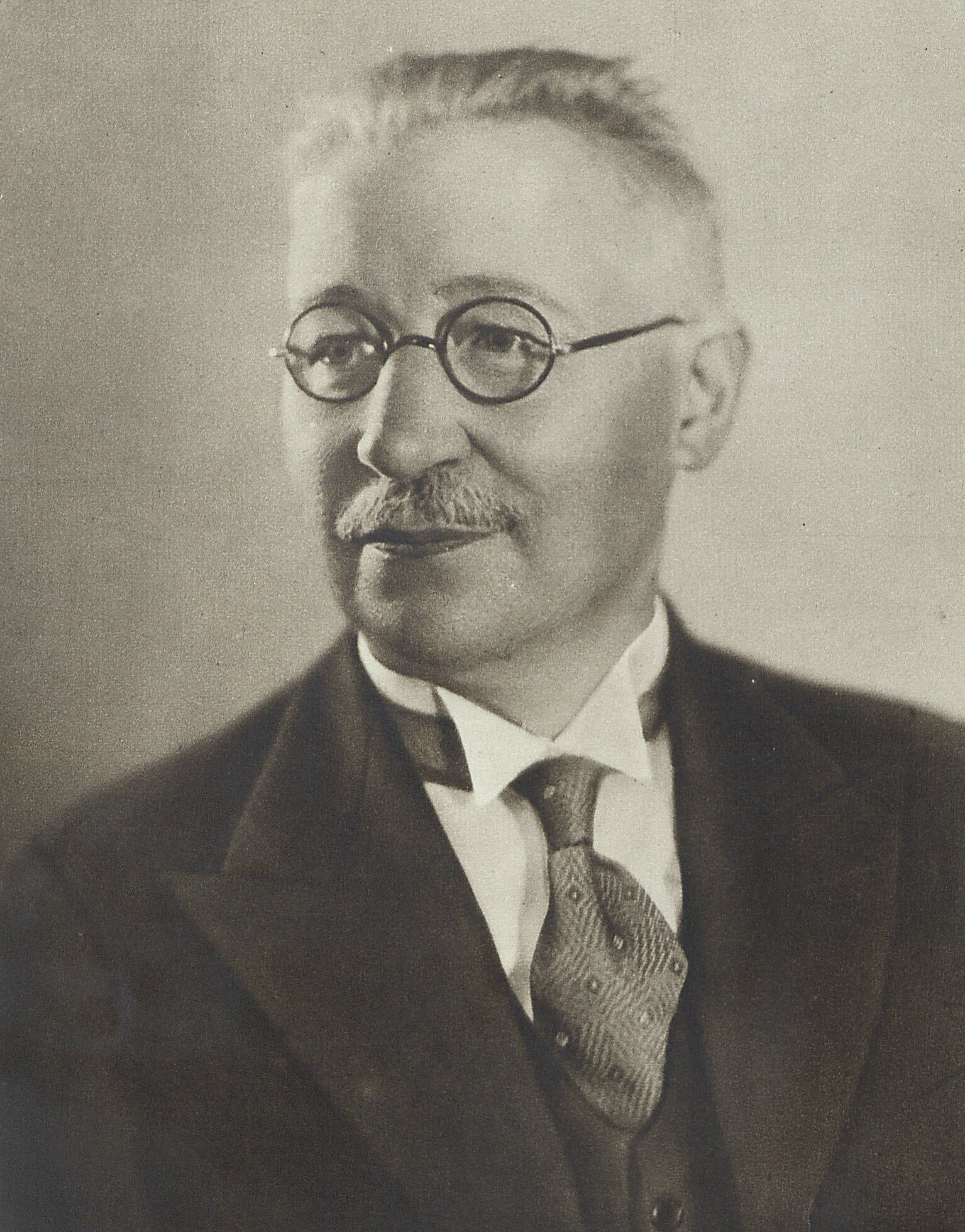
- Wojciech Świętosławski, ca. 1910
- Born: 21 June 1881; Kiryjówka, Russian Empire (modern-day Kyryyivka, Ukraine)
- Died: 29 April 1968 (aged 86); Warsaw, Polish People's Republic
- Occupation: Physicist
- Known for: founder of modern thermochemistry

Wojciech Alojzy Świętosławski (Polish pronunciation: [ˈvɔjt͡ɕɛx ɕfjɛntɔˈswafskʲi]; 1881–1968) was a Polish physical chemist, who is considered the "father of modern thermochemistry". He developed a static method of cryometric measurement and a new method of testing coal. Świętosławski was vice-chairman of the International Union of Pure and Applied Chemistry (IUPAC) and created the foundations for a new branch of physical chemistry: polyazeotropy. In 1933 he became a member of the Temporary Advisory and Scientific Committee.

== Early years ==
Świętosławski was born on 21 June 1881 in the village of Kiryjówka, Volhynia Governorate, Russian Empire. He spent his early years in Kiev, where he graduated from high school (1899). In 1906, he graduated with an engineering degree at Chemistry Department of Kiev Technical University. His first research paper, "Thermochemical Analysis of Organic Compounds" was published in 1908, in "Polish Yearly Magazine ("Rocznik Polski"). In appreciation of his work, Świętosławski was awarded the Mendeleyev Award by Russian Scientific Association. In the 1910s, Świętosławski went to Moscow, where he took a job at Chemical Laboratory of Moscow University. In 1917 he completed his thesis, writing about oxymes.

In the mid-, and late 1910, Świętosławski remained in Moscow, working, among others, on Aromatic hydrocarbon, Nitric acid, Nitro compound, Amine, and burning in bomb calorimeters.

== Interwar Poland ==
In 1918 Świętosławski returned to Poland, leaving his laboratory in Moscow and urging other highly qualified Polish scientists to follow him. In 1919, he was named Professor of Physical Chemistry at Warsaw University of Technology, and returned to scientific research, working on enthalpy of vaporization. In 1920, at the Conference of International Chemical Union in Rome, he made a motion to accept benzoic acid as an international standard of marking the bomb calorimeters. In 1922, his motion was accepted, and Świętosławski was named head of the Thermochemical Data Commission, which coordinated research on marking the heat of combustion.

In the early 1920s, Świętosławski developed a new direction in the calorimetrical research, which he called microcalorimetry. He constructed microcalorimeters, which worked in isometric and adiabatic conditions as well as microcalomieters based on partial heat exchange with the surroundings. Due to his research, it became possible, among others, to mark the value of radiation of uranium aperture. Later on, he worked on measuring of Vapor pressure and boiling temperature. Furthermore, he constructed the ebulliometer.

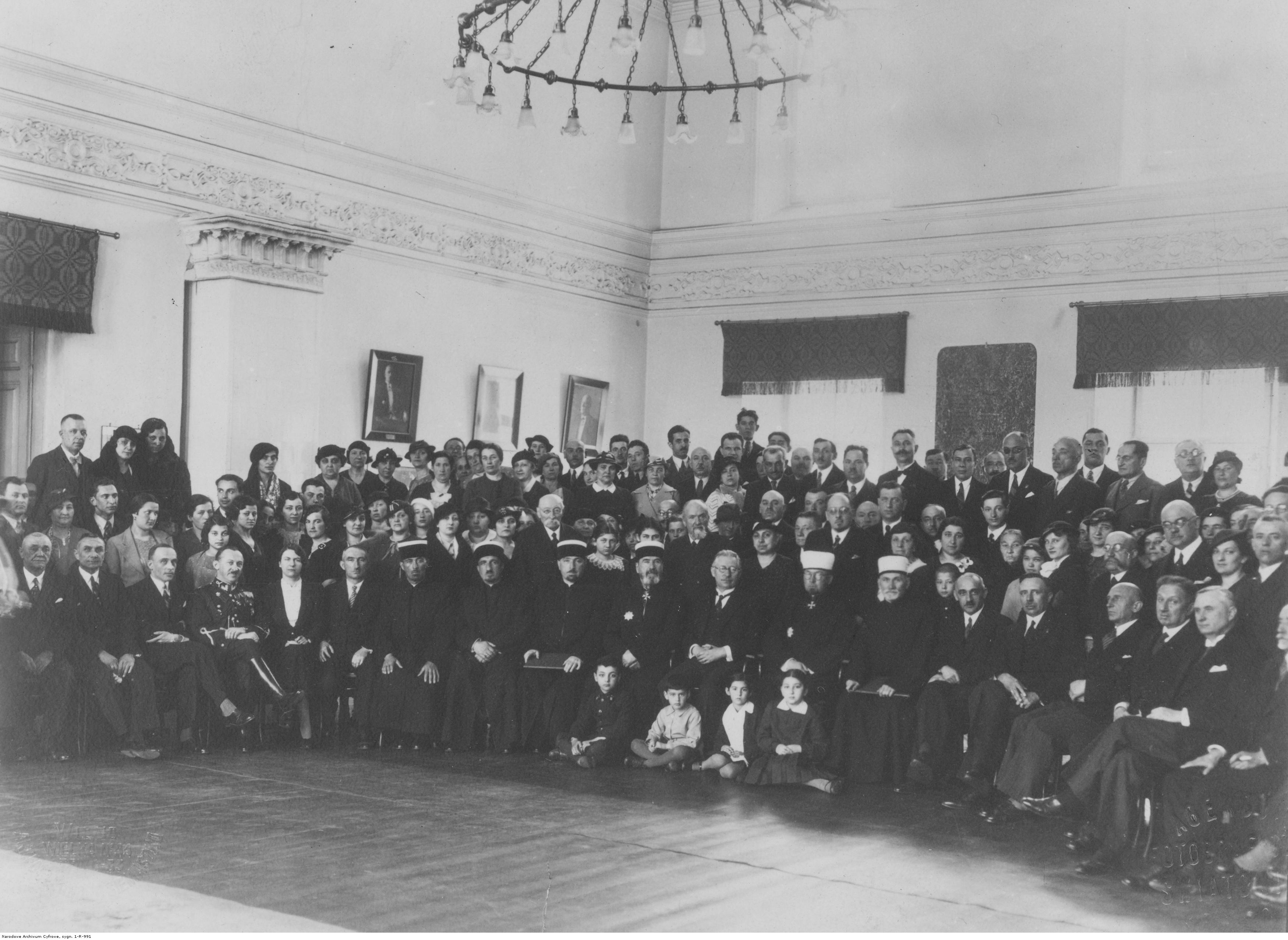
Granting religious laws to the Karaite Religious Union and the Muslim Religious Union with Wojciech Świętosławski (seated in the middle of the first row), 1936.

In 1928, Świętosławski was named deputy chairman of International Chemical Union. In 1934 he was appointed chairman of Commission of Physical-Chemical Data. At the same time, he held the post of dean of Warsaw University of Technology. He also was chairman of Polish Chemical Association (1925 - 1926), wrote for "Chemical Annual", was a member of Warsaw Scientific Society, Polish Academy of Learning, Academy of Technical Sciences, and Temporary Advisory and Scientific Committee.

From November 1935 until 1939, Świętosławski was Minister of Religious Denominations and Public Enlightenment in the governments of Marian Zyndram-Kościałkowski and Felicjan Sławoj Składkowski. Also, in 1935 - 1939, he was a member of the Polish Senate.

== World War II ==
After the outbreak of World War II, Świętosławski left Poland for the United States, where he remained until the end of the war. He worked at the University of Pittsburgh, and was a Senior Fellow at the Carnegie Mellon Institute of Industrial Research. He also wrote three monographies of Polish science in the English language, contributing to popularization of Polish scientific achievements in the USA.

== After the War ==
In 1946 Świętosławski returned to Poland. He re-created Physical Chemistry Department at the Warsaw University, also returned to work at the Warsaw University of Technology. Upon the creation of Polish Academy of Sciences he became the manager of Department of Physical Chemistry of Organic Raw Materials. Furthermore, he wrote several scientific papers, and continued working until 1960. Twice nominated to the Nobel Prize, he received a number of important Polish and international awards and was named doctor honoris causa of eight Polish universities.

Wojciech Świętosławski died in Warsaw on 29 April 1968 and was buried at the Powązki Cemetery in Warsaw.

In 2013, a monument dedicated to Świętosławski was officially unveiled at the Kyiv Polytechnic Institute where he used to study.

== See also ==
- Ebulliometer
- List of Polish chemists
- Timeline of Polish science and technology
