= Bohdan Stefanowski =

Polish scientist

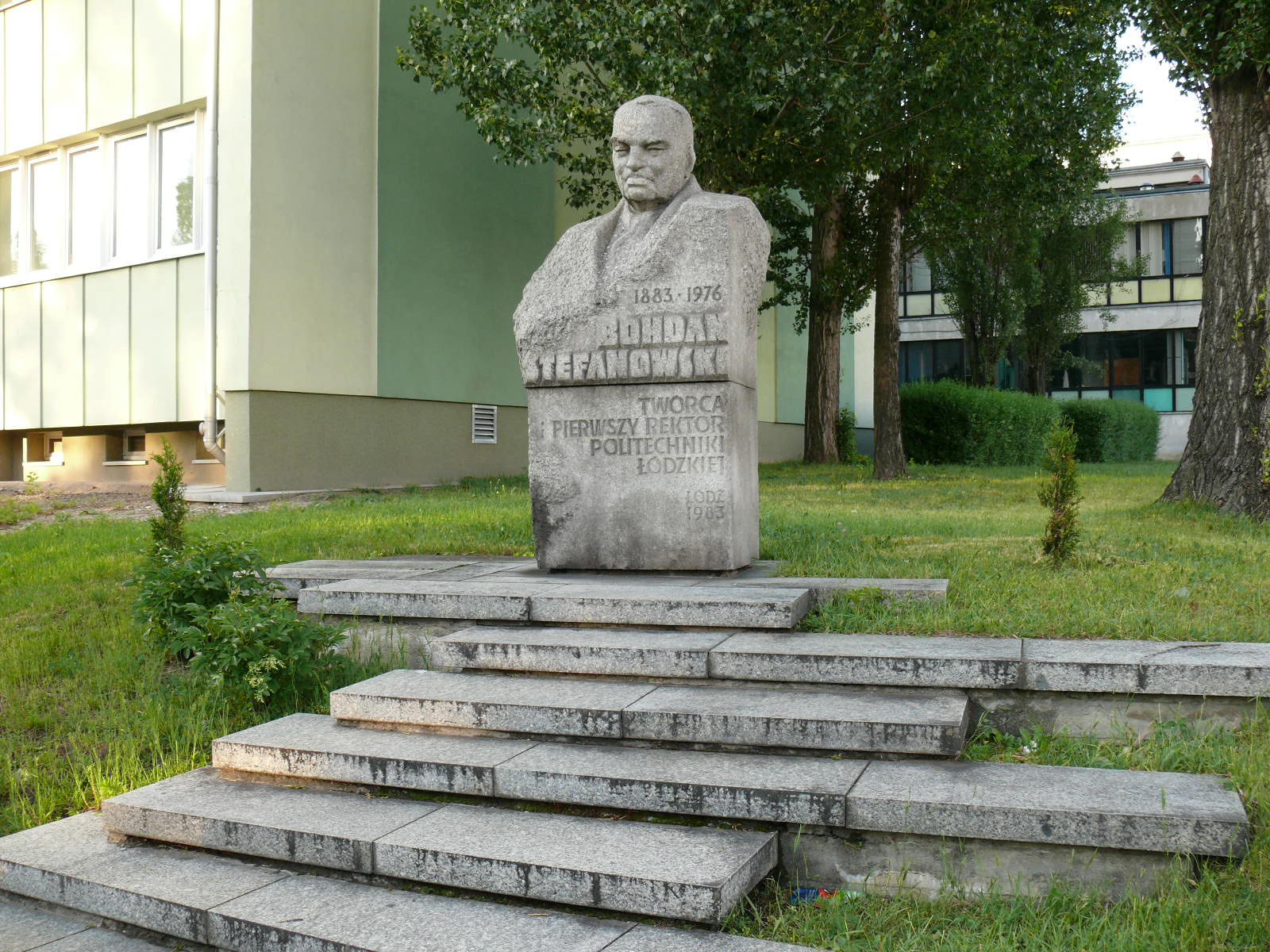
- Bust of Stefanowski.
- Born: 17 June 1883; Lublin, Poland
- Died: 3 January 1976; Warsaw
- Citizenship: Poland
- Education: Lviv Polytechnic
- Awards: Commander’s Cross with Star of the Order of Polonia Restituta
- Scientific career
- Fields: Thermodynamics

Bohdan Stefanowski (17 June 1883 in Lublin – 3 January 1976 in Warsaw) was a Polish expert in thermodynamics, one of founders of the Warsaw school of thermodynamics, the first rector of Lodz University of Technology.

After graduation from the Mechanical Engineering Department of Lviv Polytechnic in 1904, Bohdan Stefanowski pursued a career in industry as a specialist in heat management and then spent several years furthering his education under the supervision of Prof. Mollier in Dresden and Prof. Joss at Königliche Technische Hochschule in Charlottenburg.

In 1910, Bohdan Stefanowski returned to Lviv to continue his research at the Theory of Heat Engines Department headed by Prof. Tadeusz Fiedler. It was here that he was awarded his doctoral degree and lectured mechanical measurement as a paid associate professor of mechanical measurement and mills technology. In 1913, he was commissioned by Prof. Fiedler to develop a Machine Laboratory which had long been in the planning when the sudden outbreak of World War I brought an end to the ambition as well as all research and teaching done by Prof. Stefanowski, who remained in Russia for the duration of the entire World War I.

In 1918 Bohdan Stefanowski returned to Warsaw where he assumed the post of Head of the Technical Thermodynamics Department and the Machine Laboratory. In 1933 he became a member of the Temporary Scientific and Advisory Committee. In the post-war era he managed to develop and equip the facility to European standards and both the Department and the Laboratory became a hub of vibrant scientific life. Already in 1939 he was planning to open the Institute of Heat Technology at Warsaw University of Technology.

He was an excellent lecturer. In the mid-war period he authored textbooks in thermodynamics, heat management and cooling, which were among the first such publications in the Polish language. He also published a lot of research into the theory of combustion, fuel properties and cooling circuits. Bohdan Stefanowski was a very active member of technical organizations and was nominated 66th ordinary member of the Academy of Technical Sciences in Warsaw and the Polish Academy of Learning in Cracow. During the war, he continued his work organizing secret courses and working at Staatliche Technische Fachkurse. He was injured in the Warsaw Uprising and after partial recovery moved to Częstochowa, where he stayed until the end of the war.

In 1945 he was appointed Rector of Lodz University of Technology and given the task of organizing its structure and operation, which he soon completed and also established the Heat Technology Department and the Thermal Energy Laboratory. In 1949 Prof. Stefanowski returned to Warsaw, where he rebuilt the Thermal Energy Laboratory and in 1951 he succeeded in commencing the building of the future Institute of Heat Technology to be opened in 1954. The Institute of Heat Technology was officially constituted in 1961 after Bohdan Stefanowski's retirement.

The moment Polish Academy of Sciences was established, Prof. Stefanowski became its ordinary member. He supervised many doctoral and habilitation dissertations. He was granted the title of honorary doctor of Warsaw and Lodz Universities of Technology. For his lifetime achievements in the field of science he was recognized with the State Award for Outstanding Research as well as some of the highest Polish distinctions, 1st category Order of the Banner of Work, Commander's Cross with Star of the Order of Polonia Restituta.

Professor Bohdan Stefanowski died in 1976 and was buried in Powązki Cemetery in Warsaw (ch. 185-III-16)

== Bibliography ==
- Ewa Chojnacka; Zbigniew Piotrowski; Ryszard Przybylski (2006). Profesorowie Politechniki Łódzkiej 1945–2005 (in Polish). Łódź: Wydawnictwo Politechniki Łódzkiej. p. 240.
- Józef Szymczyk; Andrzej Ziębik (2004). Stulecie tradycji Instytutu Techniki Cieplnej (in Polish). Gliwice: Politechnika Śląska. ISBN 83-918727-4-2.
