= Stanisław Witkowski =

Polish Army officer, engineer (1883–1957)

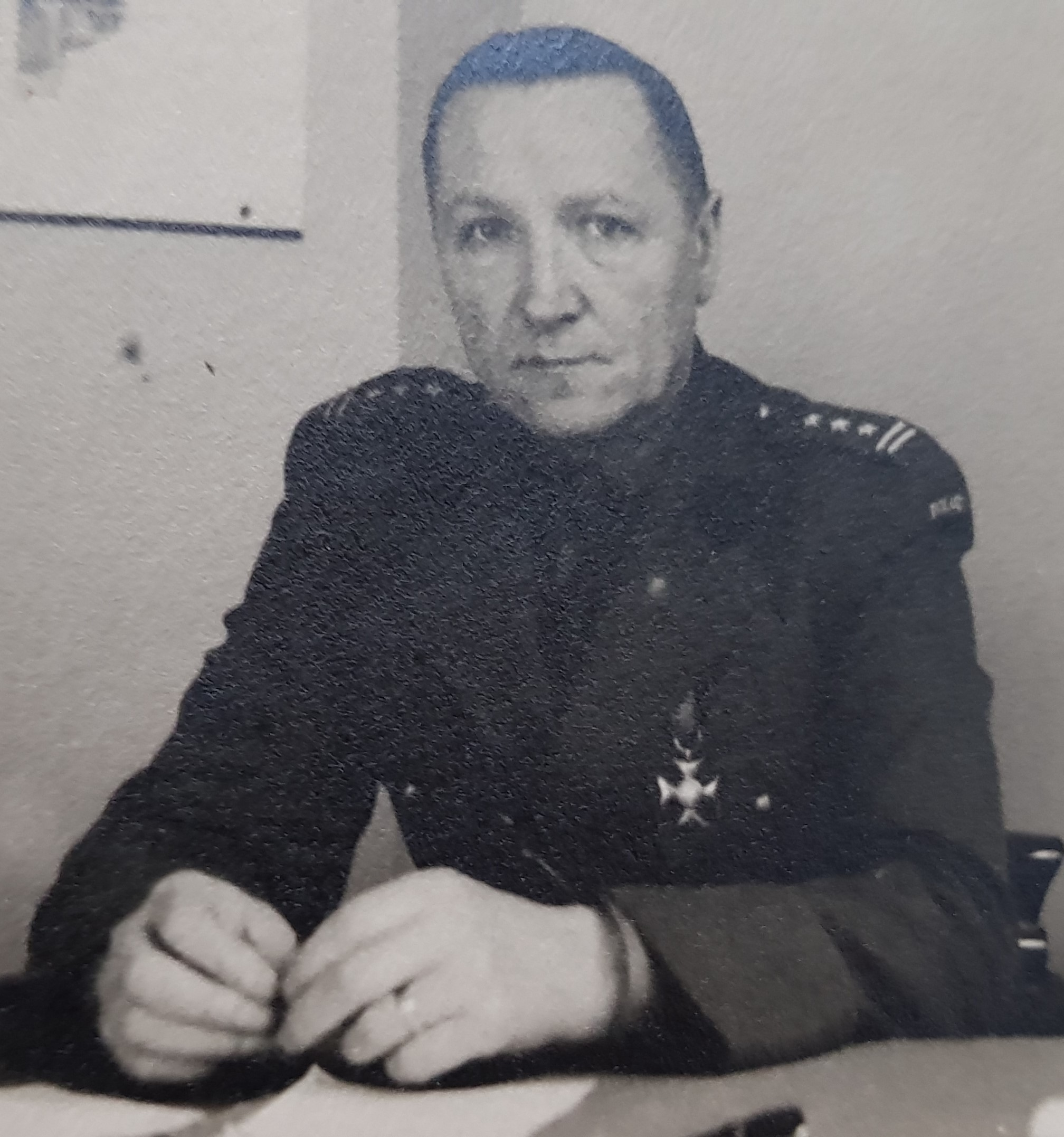
- Born: Stanisław Witkowski; 4 April 1893; Skierniewice, Poland
- Died: 28 August 1957 (aged 64); Nałęczów, Poland
- Burial place: Powązki, Warsaw, Poland
- Military career
- Allegiance: Poland
- Branch: Polish Army
- Service years: 1914–1953
- Rank: Colonel
- Unit: Military Engineers
- Commands: Munitions Factory in Warsaw (1922); Head of the Subunit in the Armaments Department of the Ministry of Military Affairs (1927); Deputy Head of the Armaments Department (also promoted to lieutenant colonel) (1931); Head of the Armament Materials Research Institute (1932); Polish Army's representative on the Board of the Polish-American Mechanics Association, and management board of that Association's Tools Plant (SMPzA) (1929–1932); Head of the Armaments Technical Institute (also promoted to colonel) (1935) officer for technical and industrial matters reporting to the Supreme Commander General Władysław Sikorski (in London -1941)); Head of the Military Technical Institute (in London 1941-1945); Head of the Technical Division in the Polish General Staff
- Conflicts: First World War; Polish-Soviet War; Second World War
- Awards: Virtuti Militari Class V - Silver Cross; Cross of Independence; Cross of Valour (four times); Cross of Merit (gold); Cross of Merit (silver); War 1918-1921 Memorial Medal; Officer's Cross of the Order of Polonia Restituta
- Other work: editor in the State Technology Publishing House (1953–1957)

Stanisław Witkowski CBE (Hon.) (23 April 1883 – 28 August 1957), was an officer, engineer and military industry organiser in the Polish Army, Hononary Commander of the Order of the British Empire.

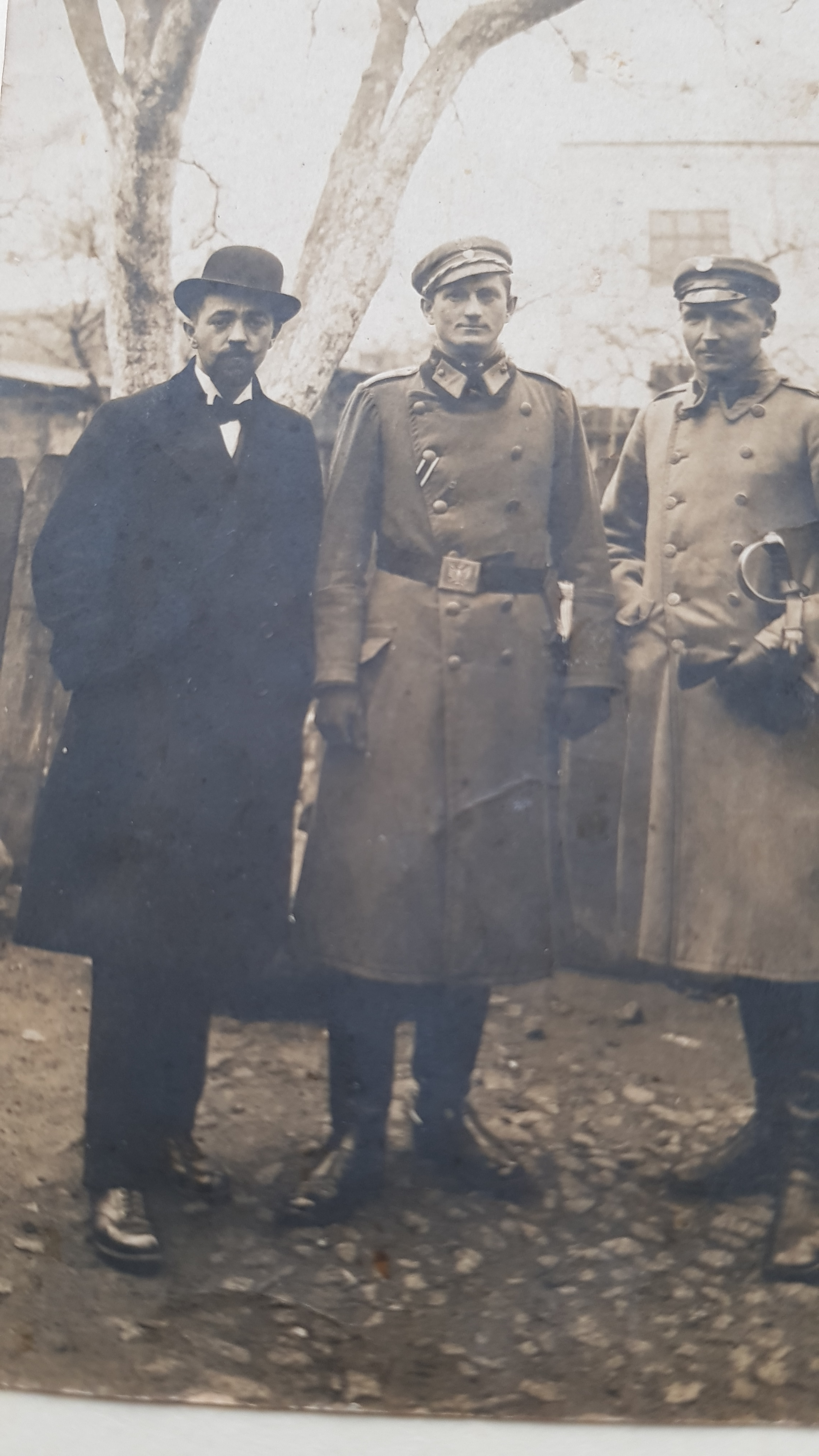
Stanisław Witkowski (right) in the uniform of the Polish Legions in World War I

== Background and early life ==
As a secondary school student Stanisław Witkowski was a member of "Association of the Polish Youth "Zet"/"Zarzewie", clandestine organisations fighting for the independence of Poland. In 1912 he studied at the Faculty of Mechanical Engineering, Lwów (Lviv) Polytechnic. There he joined the ranks of the Polish Rifle Squads (organised by Zarzewie), serving in the 1st Academic Company. Following the outbreak of the First World War he volunteered for the Polish Legions, fighting with distinction in the 1st Artillery Regiment. After the so-called "oath crisis" the Polish Legions were disbanded and the legionnaires, including Stanisław Witkowski, were interned by the Germans in the camps of Szczypiorno and Łomża. At Armistice, (which is also Poland's Independence Day) in November 1918, he took an active part in disarming the Germans in Skierniewice, then he enlisted in the Polish Army and went to the eastern front, taking service in the ammunition workshop during the ensuing Polish-Soviet War.

== In independent Poland ==
He played a prominent role in the organisation of the army of the reborn Poland. In 1922, he organised and managed the Munitions Factory in Warsaw, located in the former buildings of the Gerlach and Pulst Joint Stock Company in Wola (Warsaw), Using obsolete machines, mainly from a German arms factory in Gdańsk, the factory managed to turn out 9.2 thousand rifle rounds in 1923, and 64.6 thousand in the next three years.

On February 1, 1927, he became Division Head in the Armaments Department of the Ministry of Military Affairs. In the same year he graduated from the Mechanics Faculty of the Warsaw Polytechnic.

In 1930 he became Deputy Head of the Armaments Department and was promoted to the rank of lieutenant colonel. From June 1932, he was Head of the Armament Materials Research Institute. On January 1, 1935, already as a colonel, he was appointed Commandant of the Military Institute of Armament Technology. Both institutes were R & D establishments, as well was centres for experimental constructions and made a significant contribution to the good organization of the Polish arms industry and its technological advancement. Stanisław Witkowski continued to learn about military technology during study tours in the arms factories of France, Switzerland and Hungary. In 1934 he was the Polish Army's representative on the Board of the Polish-American Mechanics Association, and management board of that Association's Tools Plant (SMPzA) in Pruszków near Warsaw. The President of the management board of that company was Stefan Starzyński, later the heroic Mayor of Warsaw during the 1939 Siege of the City, executed by the Nazi Germans in 1940.

In 1933-39 was a liaison officer to and member of the Temporary Scientific and Advisory Committee

== London ==
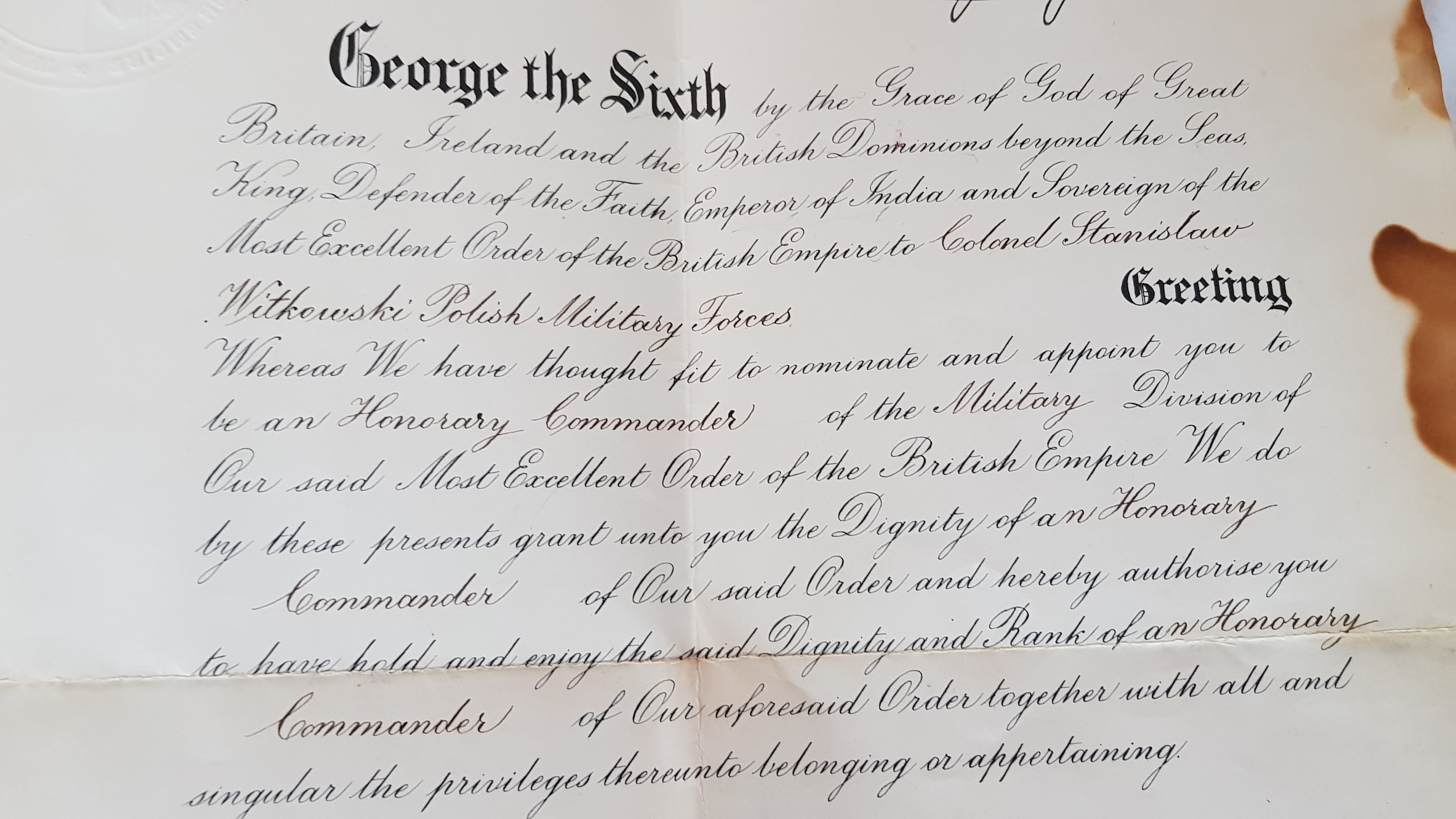
Document of col. Stanisław Witkowski's OBE

During the Second World War he stayed in London serving in the Polish Armed Forces in the West. In 1940 he was the officer for technical and industrial matters reporting to the Supreme Commander General Władysław Sikorski, and in 1941-1945 Head of the Military Technical Institute in London. On October 4, 1943, King George VI granted him the Dignity of an Honorary Commander of the Military Department of the Order of the British Empire (CBE).

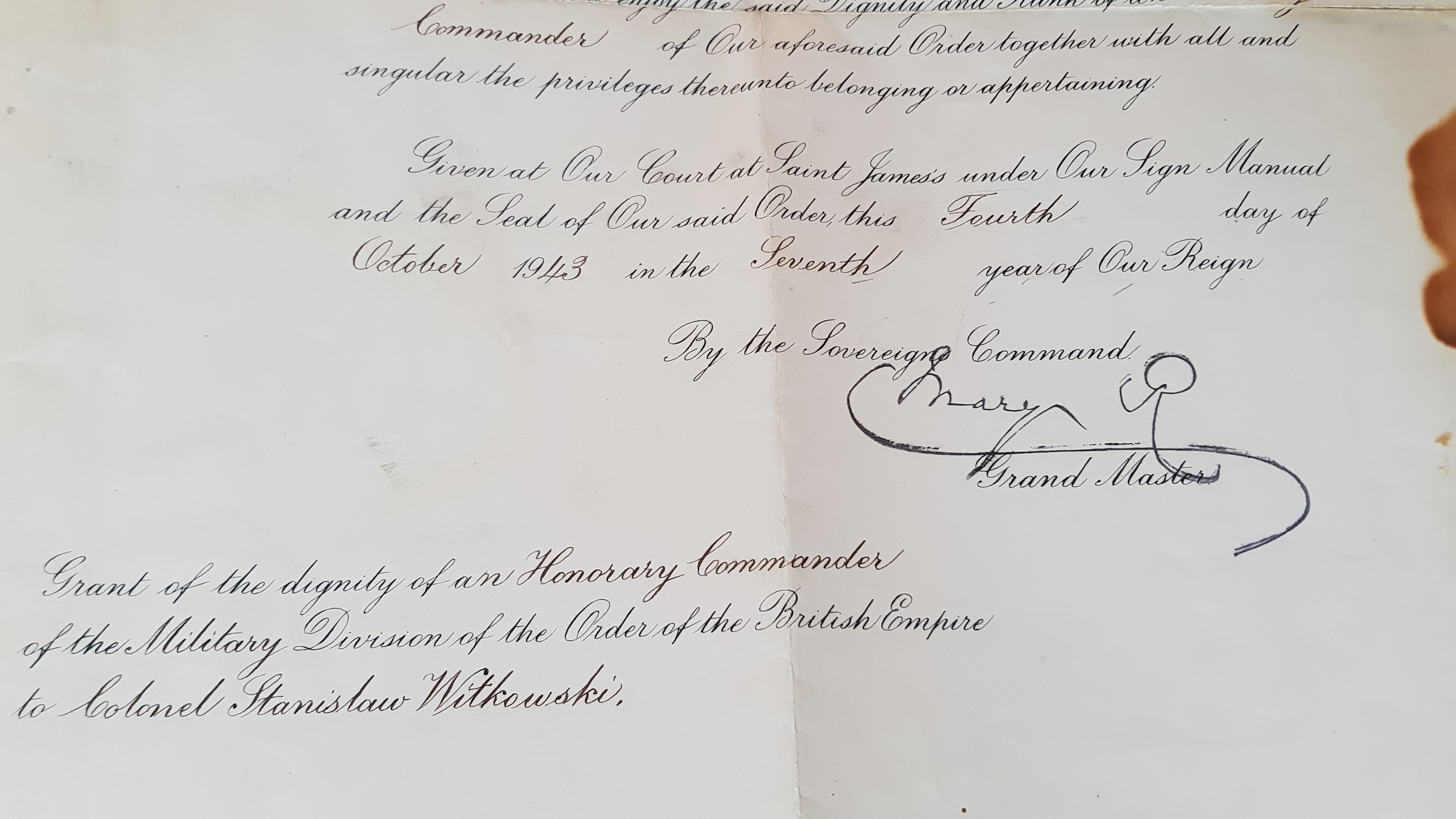
Data of awarding Stanisław Witkowski's OBE

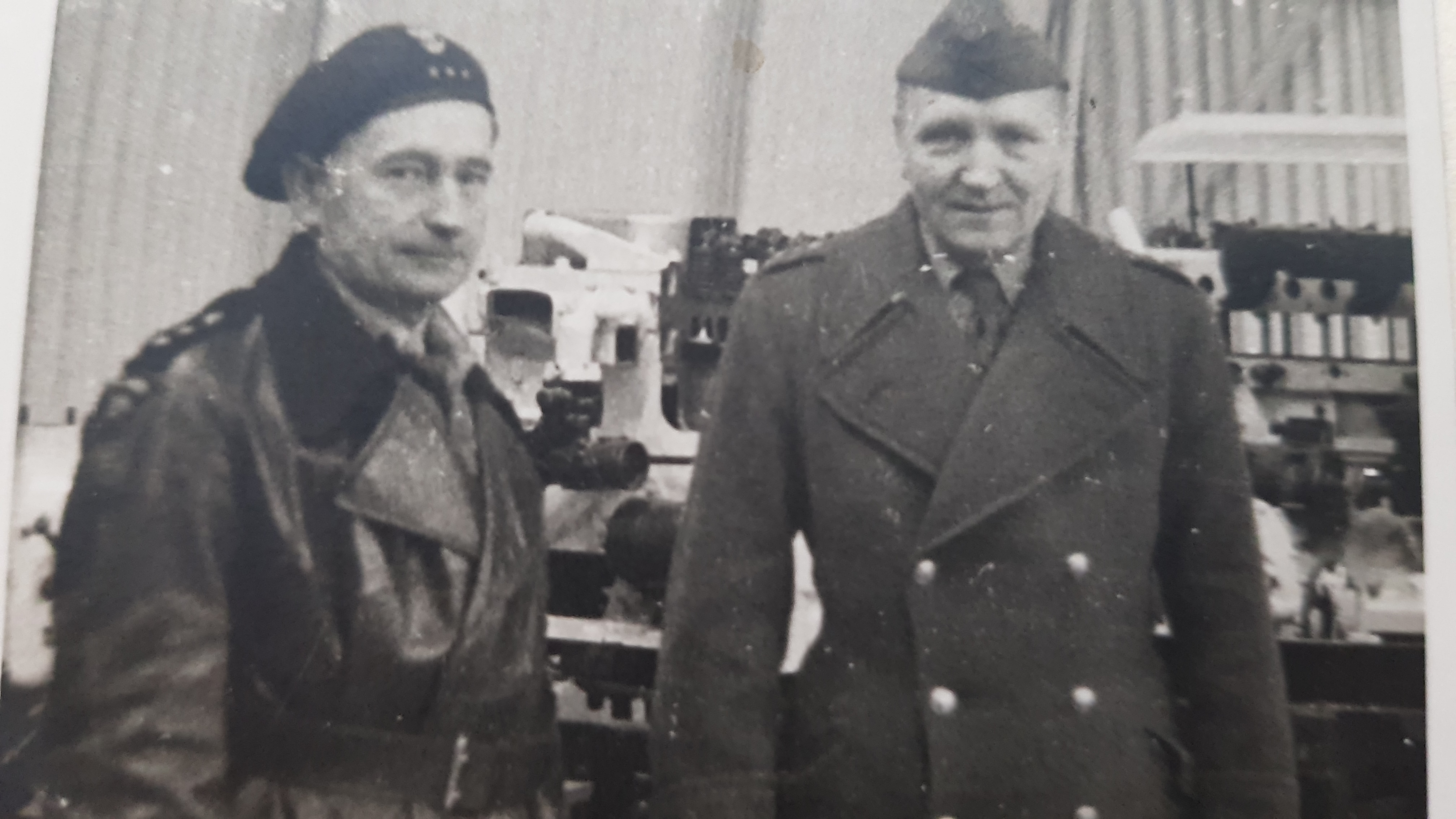
col. Stanisław Witkowski in England

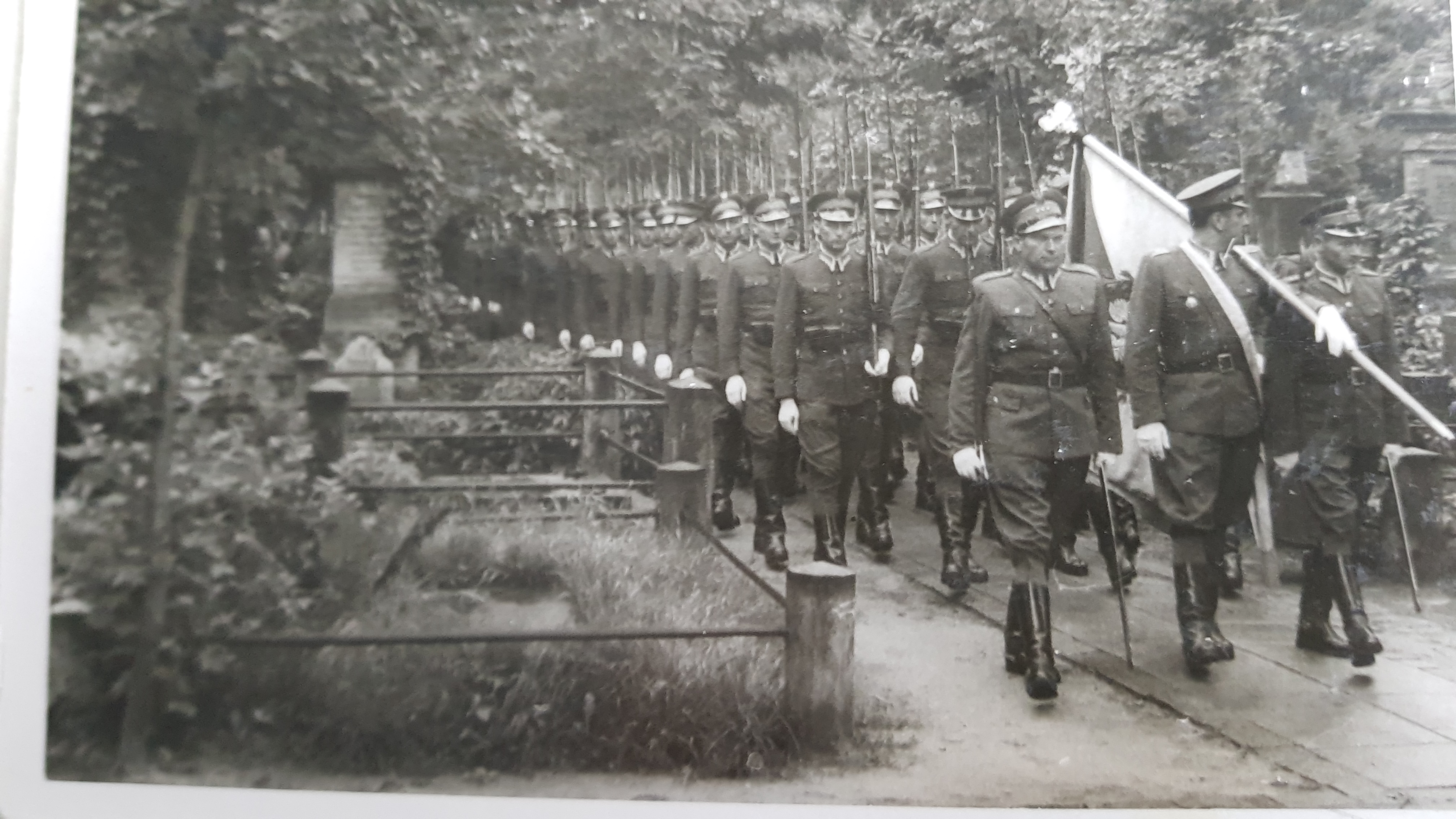
Polish Army's Honour Guard at col. Stanisław Witkowski funeral at Powązki Cemetery, 1957

== Back in Poland after the war ==
Poland was fast becoming a communist country and a prewar officer faced a difficult choice. Nevertheless, in 1946 col. Stanisław Witkowski returned to Poland, where he became the head of the Technical Department in the General Staff, as Józef Kuropieska mentions in his memoirs. Then he worked at the Polish Committee for Standardisation, and in 1953 he retired to become a scientific editor in the technical vocabulary section of the State Technical Publishing House.

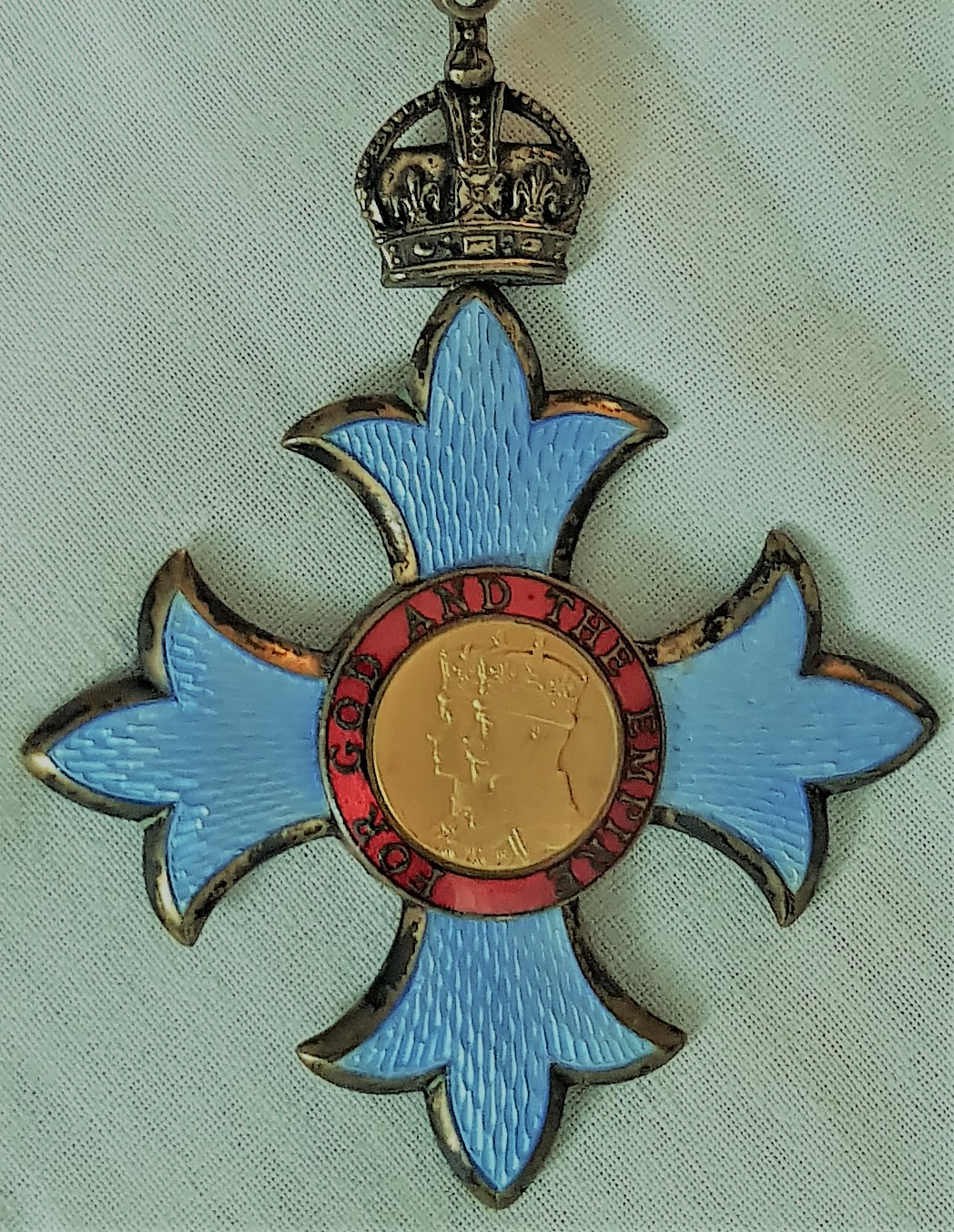
Order of the British Empire received by Colonel Witkowski Stanisław Witkowski (middle) in England

== Death ==
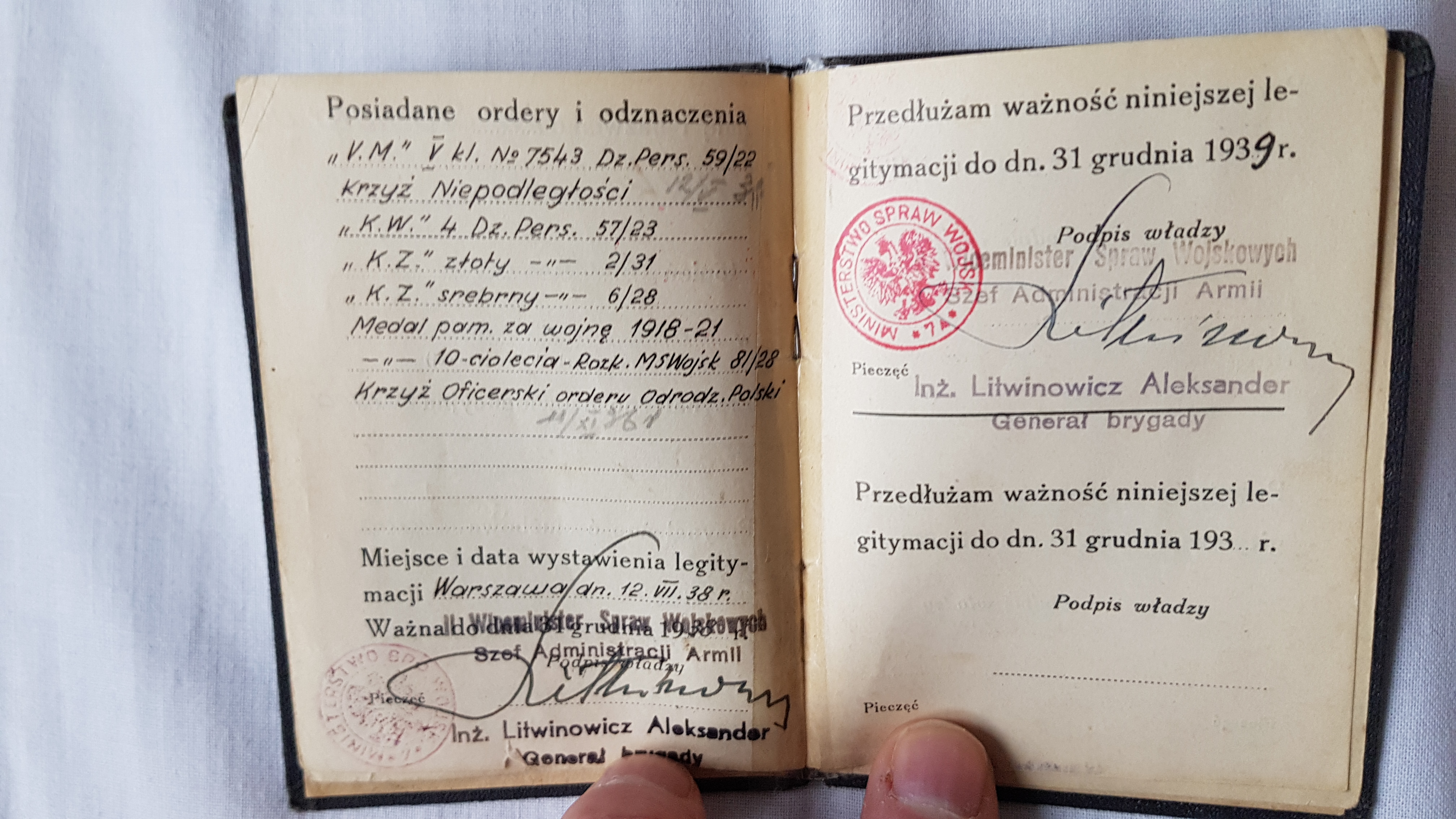
Col. Witkowski's list of his prewar Polish decorations from his military ID

On 28 August 1963 Witkowski died in Nałęczów. He was given a funeral in Powązki, which the Polish Army's Honour Guard attended. The funeral service was also held in London at Brompton Oratory on 5 October 1957.

== Honours ==
- Virtuti Militari Class V - Silver Cross.
- Cross of Independence,
  - Cross of Valour (four times),
    - Cross of Merit (Gold and Silver),
    - War 1918-191 Memorial Medal
    - Officer's Cross of the Order of Polonia Restituta
    - Honorary Commander of the Order of the British Empire (CBE)

== Bibliography ==
- Kuropieska, Józef (1984). Z powrotem w służbie (in Polish). Warsaw: Państwowy Instyttut Wydawczny. ISBN 83-06-01075-2. OCLC 11734720.
- Kuropieska, Józef (1981). Misja w Londynie (in Polish). Czytelnik. ISBN 83-07-00304-0. OCLC 9254214.
- Piłatowicz, Józef (1984a). Kadra inżynierska wytwórni obrabiarek i narzędzi Stowarzyszenia Mechaników Polskich z Ameryki w Pruszkowie w okresie miedzywojennym (część I) (online version - searchable) (in Polish). Vol. 4.
- Piłatowwicz, Józef (1984a). Kadra inżynierska wytwórni obrabiarek i narzędzie Stowarzyszenia Machaników Polski z Ameryki w Pruszkowie w okresie międzywojennym: (część I) - photocopied printed version - page references in this wikipedia entry are to the printed version. Vol. 4.
- PIłatowicz, Stanisław (2005). Ruch stowarzyszeniowy inżynierów i techników polskich do 1939 t. T2. Słownik polskich stowarzyszeń technicznych i naukowo-technicznych do 1939 r. (in Polish) (PDF). Warsaw.
- Piłatowicz, Józef (1984b). Kadra inżynierska w Stowarzyszeniu Mechaników Polskich z Ameryki w okresie międzywojennym; (część II). Vol. 5. Warsaw.
- Muzeum Przemysłu Wojennego w Pogórzu /w organizacji/ (in Polish).
- Z żałobnej karty. Inż. Stanisław Witkowski (in Polish). 1957. p. 452.
- mgr inż. Stanisław Witkowski (in Polish). 1957. p. 508.
