= Archaeology of Northern Europe =

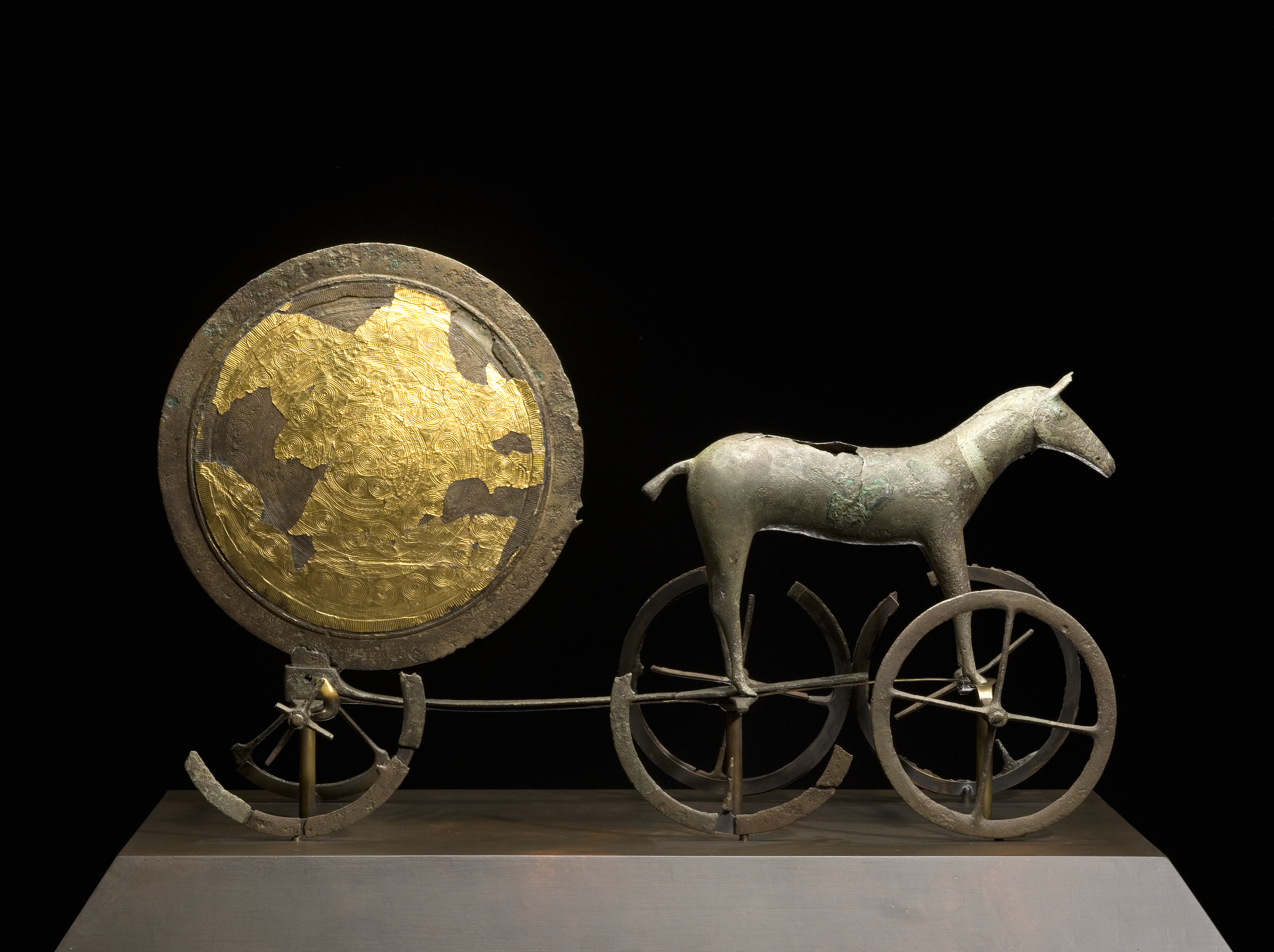
The Trundholm Sun Chariot, Denmark, Nordic Bronze Age, c. 1400 BC

The archaeology of Northern Europe studies the prehistory of Scandinavia and the adjacent North European Plain, roughly corresponding to the territories of modern Sweden, Norway, Denmark, Northern Germany, Poland, the Netherlands and Belgium.

The region entered the Mesolithic around the 7th millennium BC. The transition to the Neolithic is characterized by the Funnelbeaker culture in the 4th millennium BC. The Chalcolithic is marked by the arrival of the Corded Ware culture, possibly the first influence in the region of Indo-European expansion. The Nordic Bronze Age proper began roughly one millennium later, around 1500 BC. The end of the Bronze Age is characterized by cultural contact with the Central European La Tène culture (Celts), contributing to the development of the Iron Age by the 4th century BC, presumably the locus of Common Germanic culture. Northern Europe enters the protohistorical period in the early centuries AD, with the adoption of writing and ethnographic accounts by Roman authors.

== Periodization ==
The following is a refined listing of Northern European archaeological periods, expanded from the basic three-age system with finer subdivisions and extension into the modern historical period.

| Stone Age (to c. 1500 BC) | Palaeolithic | to c. 8000 BC |
| Stone Age (to c. 1500 BC) | Mesolithic | c. 8000 – c. 3000 BC |
| Stone Age (to c. 1500 BC) | Neolithic | c. 3000 – c. 1750 BC |
| Bronze Age | | c. 1750 – c. 500 BC |
| Iron Age (c. 500 BC – c. 800 AD) | Pre-Roman Iron Age | c. 500 BC – c. 1 AD |
| Iron Age (c. 500 BC – c. 800 AD) | Roman Iron Age | c. 1 – c. 400 AD |
| Iron Age (c. 500 BC – c. 800 AD) | Germanic Iron Age | c. 400 – c. 800 AD |
| Viking Age | | c. 800 – c. 1066 AD |
| Medieval | | c. 1066 – c. 1500 |
| Post-medieval | | c. 1500 – c. 1800 |
| Industrial/Modern | Industrial period | c. 1800 – c. 1917 |
| Industrial/Modern | Modern period | c. 1917 – present |

== Stone Age ==
During the 6th millennium BC, the climate of Scandinavia was generally warmer and more humid than today. The bearers of the Nøstvet and Lihult cultures and the Kongemose culture were mesolithic hunter-gatherers. The Kongemose culture was replaced by the Ertebølle culture, adapting to the climatic changes and gradually adopting the Neolithic Revolution, transitioning to the megalithic Funnelbeaker culture.

== Pottery Neolithic ==
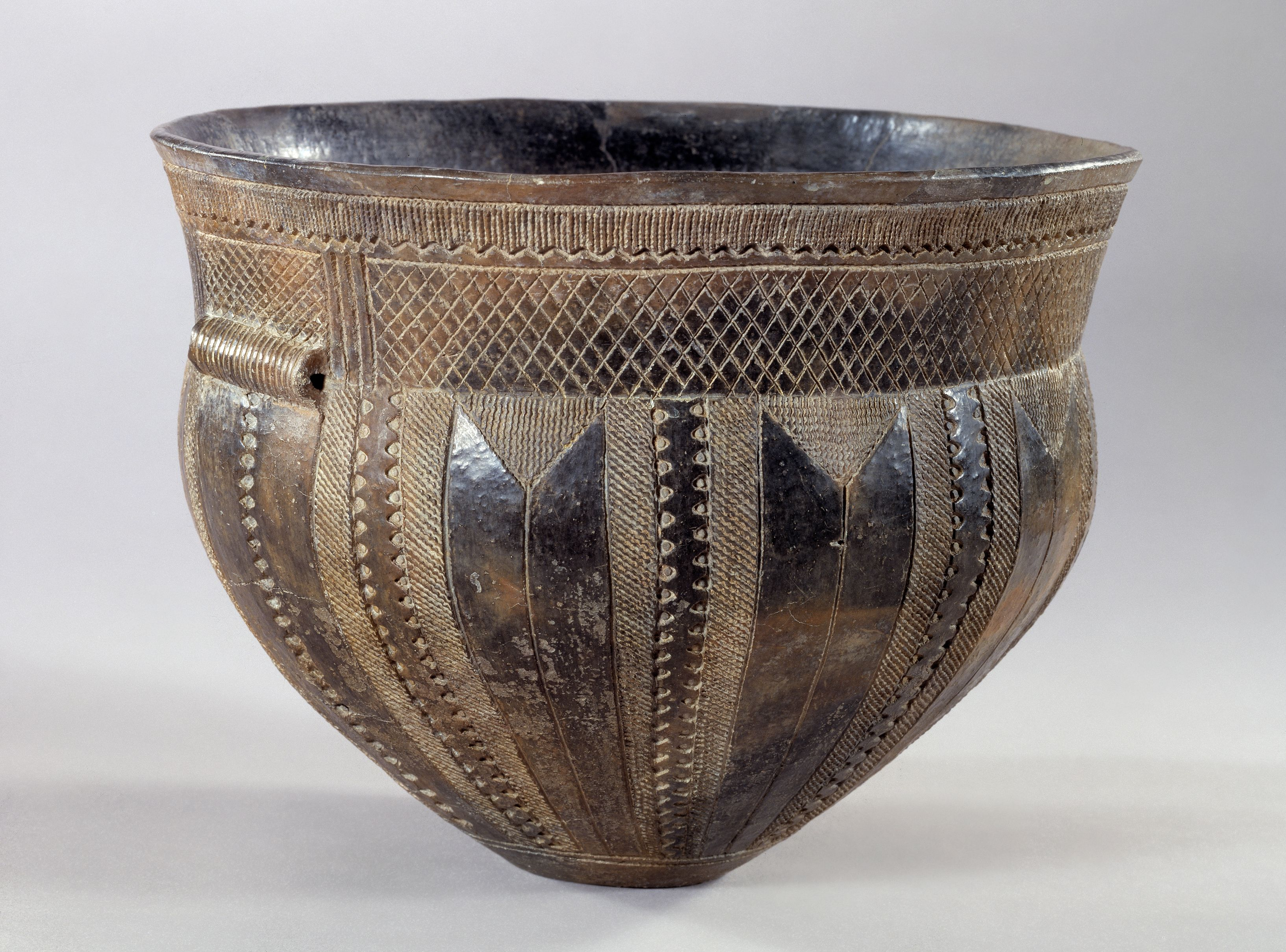
Skarpsalling vessel, Denmark, 3200 BC

The Pezmog 4 archaeological site along the Vychegda River (Komi Republic) was discovered in 1994. Pottery of early comb ware type appears there already at the beginning of the 6th millennium BC.

Pit–Comb Ware culture appeared in northern Europe as early 4200 BC, and continued until c. 2000 BC. Some scholars argue that it is associated with the area of the Uralic languages.

During the 4th millennium BC, the Funnelbeaker culture expanded into Sweden up to Uppland. The Nøstvet and Lihult cultures were succeeded by the Pitted Ware culture.

Early Indo-European presence likely dates to the early 3rd millennium BC, introducing branches of the Corded Ware culture (such as the Battle Axe Culture), later be followed by the Nordic Bronze Age.

== Bronze Age ==
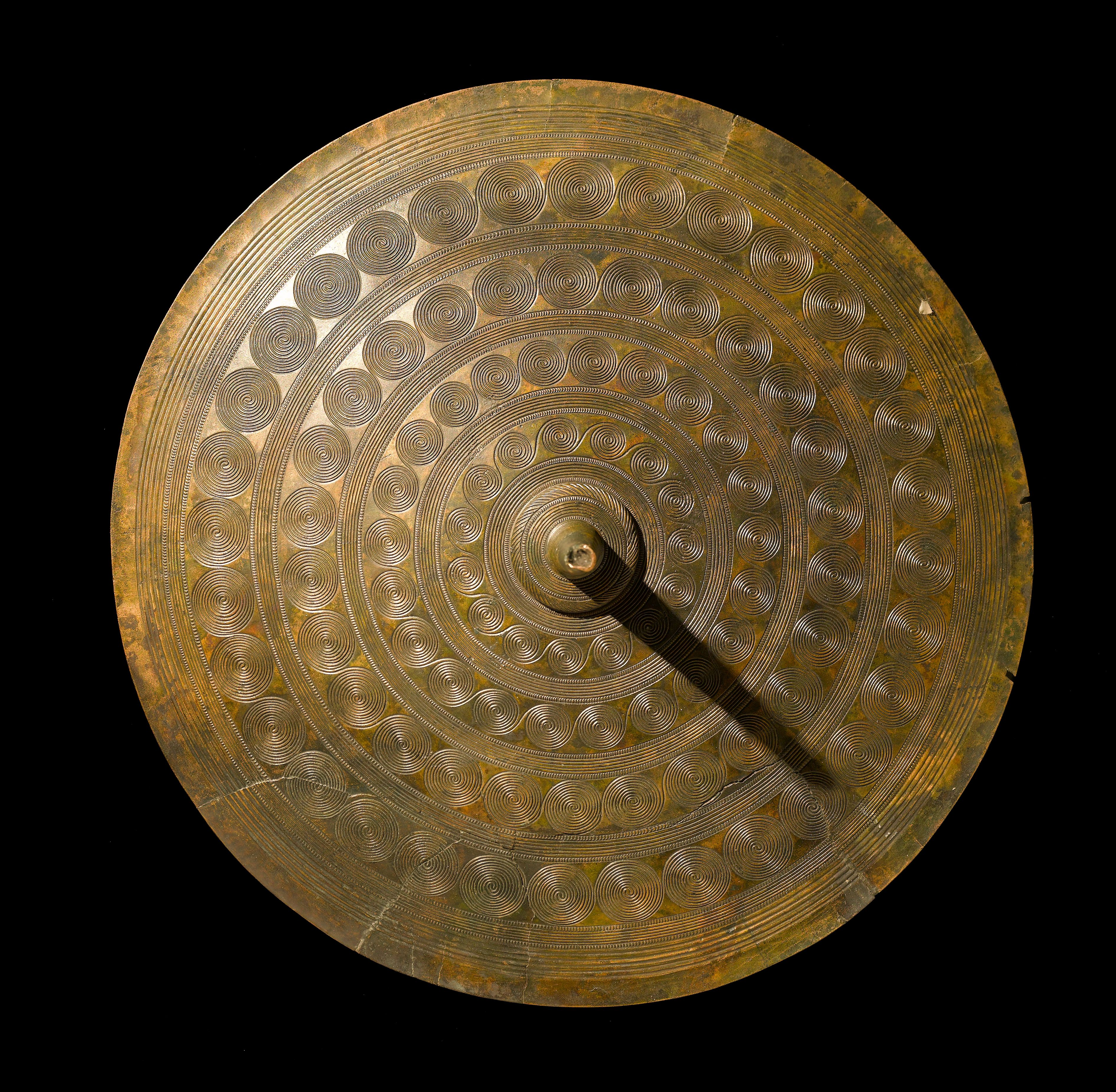
Langstrup belt plate, Denmark, c. 1400 BC

The Bronze Age in the North European Plain begins with the Únětice culture (c. 2300 BC), which was centred in Central Europe. The Nordic Bronze Age culture in Scandinavia and northern Germany emerged in the period 2000-1750 BC as a continuation of the Dagger period, which was rooted in the Battle Axe culture (the Swedish-Norwegian Corded Ware variant), the Single Grave Culture (the north German and Danish Corded Ware variant) and Bell Beaker culture, as well as from influence from the Únětice culture. The metallurgical influences from Central Europe are especially noticeable. The Bronze Age in Scandinavia can be said to begin shortly after 2000 BC with the introduction and use of bronze tools, followed by a more systematic adoption of bronze metalworking technology from 1750 BC. Copper metallurgy had been practised on a small scale from c. 2400 BC before the introduction of bronze.

The Trzciniec culture (2400–1300 BC), Hilversum culture (1870–1050 BC), Tumulus culture (1600–1200 BC), Urnfield culture (1300–750 BC) and Lusatian culture (1200–500 BC) also extended across parts of the North European Plain during the Bronze Age.

Iron metallurgy began to be practised in Scandinavia during the later Bronze Age, from at least the 9th century BC. Around the 5th century BC, the Nordic Bronze Age was succeeded by the Pre-Roman Iron Age and the Jastorf culture. The Nordic Bronze Age is often considered ancestral to the Germanic peoples.

== Iron Age ==
The tripartite division of the Nordic Iron Age into "Pre-Roman Iron Age", "Roman Iron Age" and "Germanic Iron Age" is due to Swedish archaeologist Oscar Montelius.

=== Pre-Roman Iron Age ===
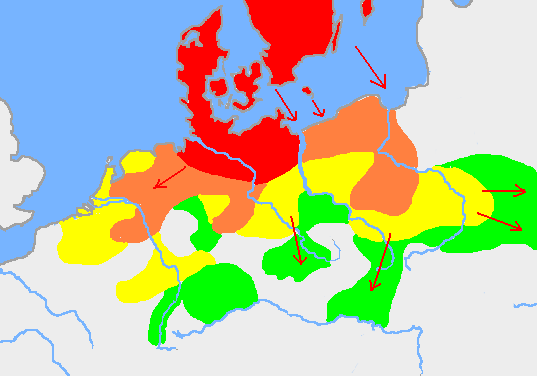
Expansion of early Germanic tribes into previously mostly Celtic Central Europe: Settlements before 750 BC New settlements by 500 BC New settlements by 250 BC New settlements by AD 1 Some sources also give a date of 750 BC for the earliest expansion out of southern Scandinavia and northern Germany along the North Sea coast towards the mouth of the Rhine.

The Pre-Roman Iron Age (5th/4th–1st centuries BC) was the earliest part of the Iron Age in Scandinavia and the North European Plain. Succeeding the Nordic Bronze Age, the Iron Age developed in contact with the Hallstatt culture in Central Europe.

Archaeologists first decided to divide the Iron Age of Northern Europe into distinct pre-Roman and Roman Iron Ages after Emil Vedel unearthed a number of Iron Age artifacts in 1866 on the island of Bornholm. They did not exhibit the same permeating Roman influence seen in most other artifacts from the early centuries AD, indicating that parts of northern Europe had not yet come into contact with the Romans at the beginning of the Iron Age.

Out of the Late Bronze Age Urnfield culture of the 12th century BC developed the Early Iron Age Hallstatt culture of Central Europe from the 8th to 6th centuries BC, which was followed by the La Tène culture of Central Europe (450 BC to 1st century BC). Although the metal iron came into wider use by metalsmiths in the Mediterranean as far back as c. 1300 BC due to the Late Bronze Age collapse, the Pre-Roman Iron Age of Northern Europe covered the 5th/4th to the 1st centuries BC.

The beginning of the Iron Age was defined by the appearance of large urnfields. A recent study from researchers from the Kiel University showed, however, that the first urnfields were established in the 7th century BCE already and thus, in the very late Bronze Age.

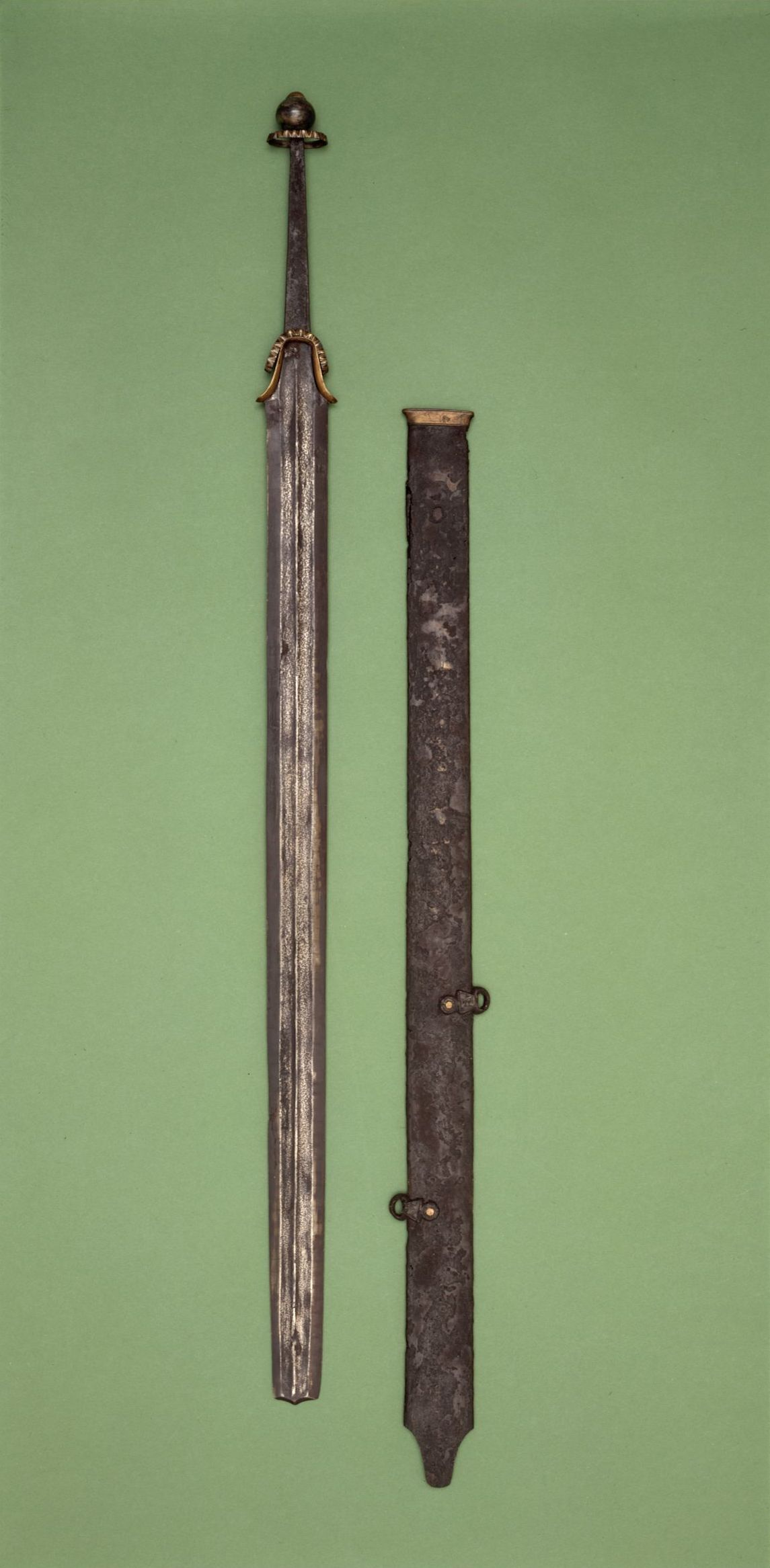
Sword from Lindholmgård, Denmark

The Iron Age in northern Europe is markedly distinct from the Celtic La Tène culture south of it. The old long-range trading networks south–north between the Mediterranean cultures and Northern Europe had broken down at the end of the Nordic Bronze Age and caused a rapid and deep cultural change in Scandinavia. Bronze, which was an imported alloy, suddenly became very scarce; and iron, which was a local natural resource, slowly became more abundant, as the techniques for extracting, smelting and smithing it were acquired from their Central European Celtic neighbours. Iron was extracted from bog iron in peat bogs, and the first iron objects to be fabricated were needles and edged tools such as swords and sickles. The rise of iron use in Scandinavia was slow: bog ore was only abundant in southwestern Jutland and it was not until 200–100 BC that iron-working techniques were generally mastered and a productive smithing industry had evolved in the larger settlements. Iron products were also known in Scandinavia during the Bronze Age, but they were a scarce imported material. Similarly, imported bronze continued to be used during the Iron Age in Scandinavia, but it was now much scarcer and mostly used for decoration.

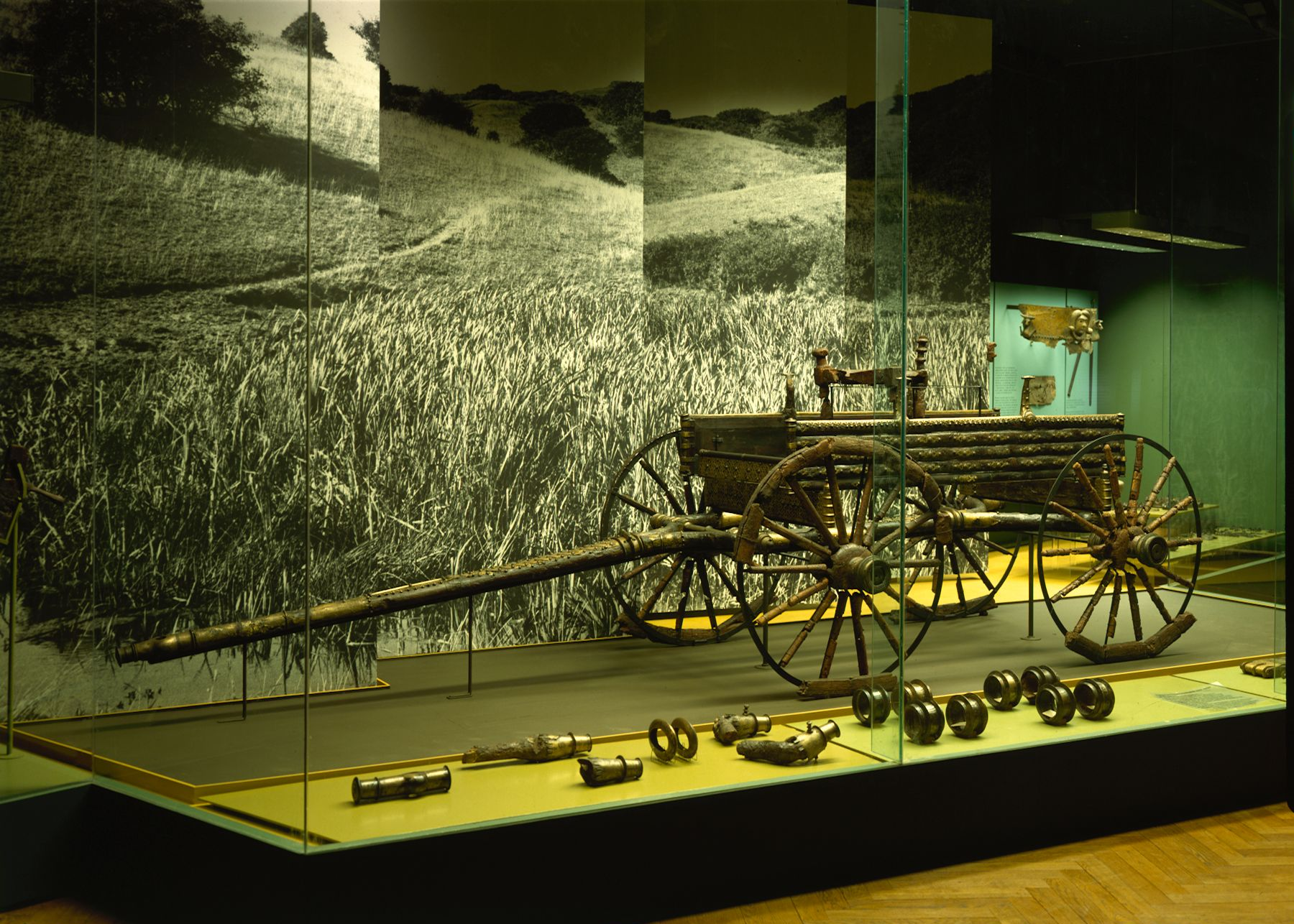
The Dejbjerg wagon, 1st century BC, in the National Museum of Denmark

Funerary practices continued the Bronze Age tradition of burning corpses and placing the remains in urns, a characteristic of the Urnfield culture. During the previous centuries, influences from the Central European La Tène culture had spread to Scandinavia from north-western Germany, and there are finds from this period from all the provinces of southern Scandinavia. Archaeologists have found swords, shield bosses, spearheads, scissors, sickles, pincers, knives, needles, buckles, kettles, etc. from this time. Bronze continued to be used for torcs and kettles, the styles of which were continuous from the Bronze Age. Some of the most prominent finds from the pre-Roman Iron Age in northern Europe are the Gundestrup cauldron and the Dejbjerg wagons, two four-wheeled wagons of wood with bronze parts.

The cultural change that ended the Nordic Bronze Age was influenced by the expansion of Hallstatt culture from the south and accompanied by a changing climate, which caused a dramatic change in the flora and fauna. In Scandinavia, this period is often called the "Findless Age", due to the lack of archaeological finds. While the archaeological record from Scandinavia is consistent with an initial decline in population, the southern part of the culture, the Jastorf culture, was in expansion southwards. It consequently appears that climate change played an important role in this southward expansion into continental Europe. It is debated why cultural innovation spread geographically during this time: whether the new material culture reflects a possibly warlike movement of Germanic peoples ("demic diffusion") southwards or whether innovations found at the Pre-Roman Iron Age sites represent a more peaceful trans-cultural diffusion. The current view in the Netherlands is that Iron Age innovations, starting with Hallstatt (800 BC), did not involve intrusions and featured a local development from Bronze Age culture. Another Iron Age nucleus considered to represent a local development is the Wessenstedt culture (800–600 BC).

The bearers of this northern Iron Age culture were likely speakers of Germanic languages. The stage of development of this Germanic is not known, although Proto-Germanic has been proposed. The late phase of this period sees the beginnings of the Migration Period, starting with the invasions of the Teutons and the Cimbri until their defeat at the Battle of Aquae Sextiae in 102 BC, presaging the more turbulent Roman Iron Age and Migration Period.

Fortified settlements from this period include Tönsberg, Erdenburg, Grotenburg and Funkenburg in Germany, Borremose and Lyngsmose in Denmark and Atuatuca in Belgium.

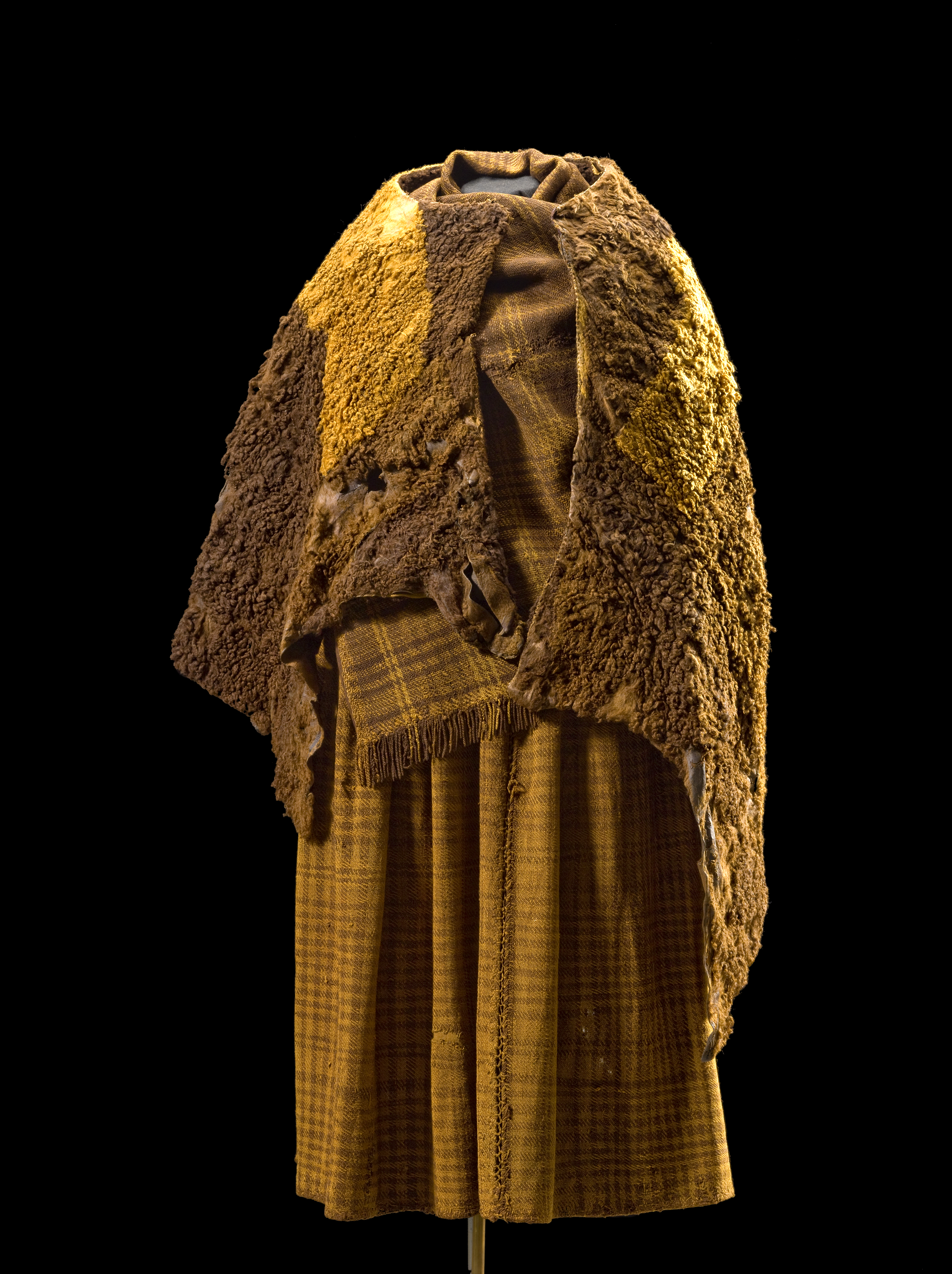
Clothing worn by the Huldremose Woman, Denmark, 2nd cent. BC

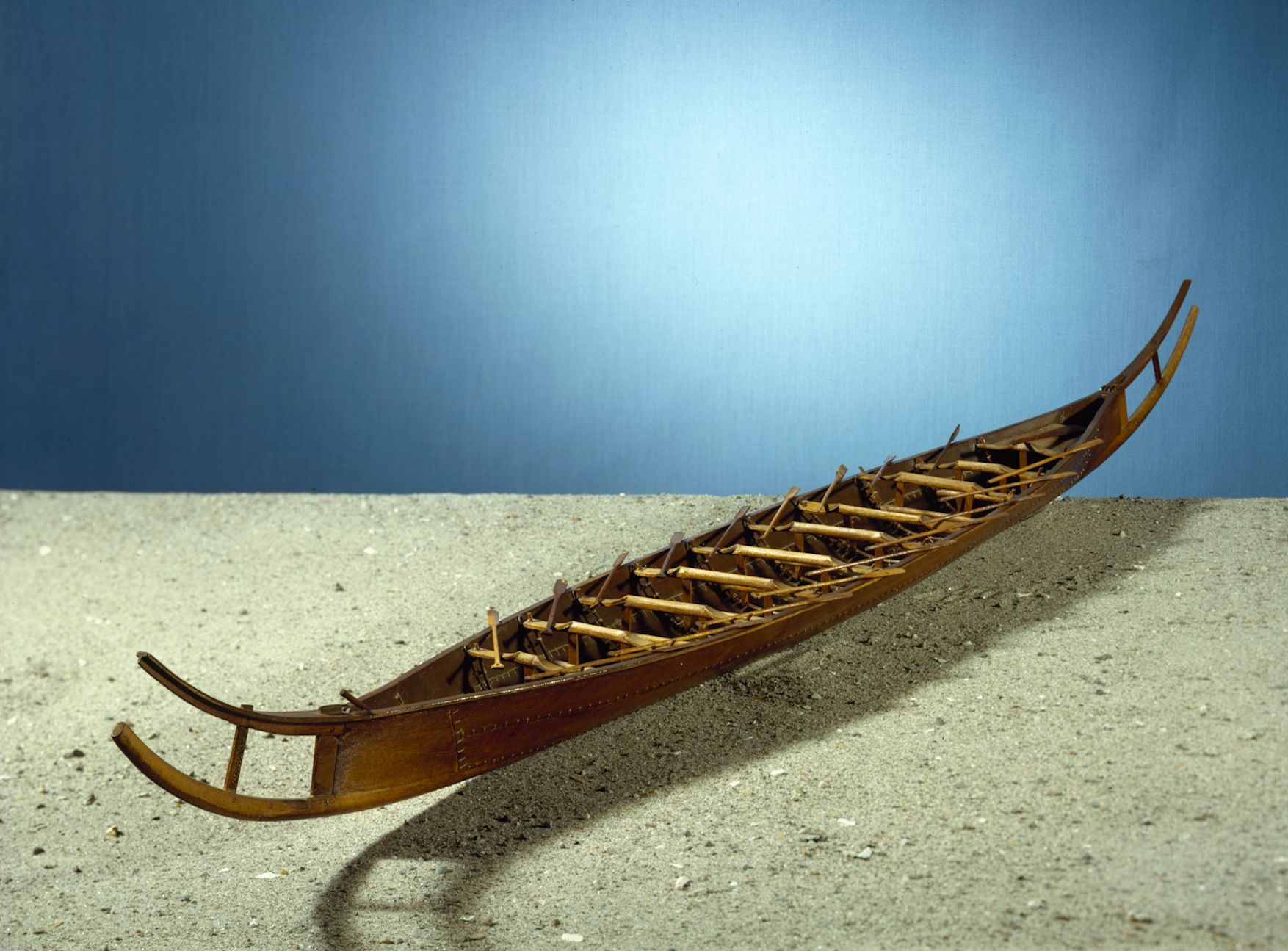
Hjortspring boat, Denmark, c. 400 BC

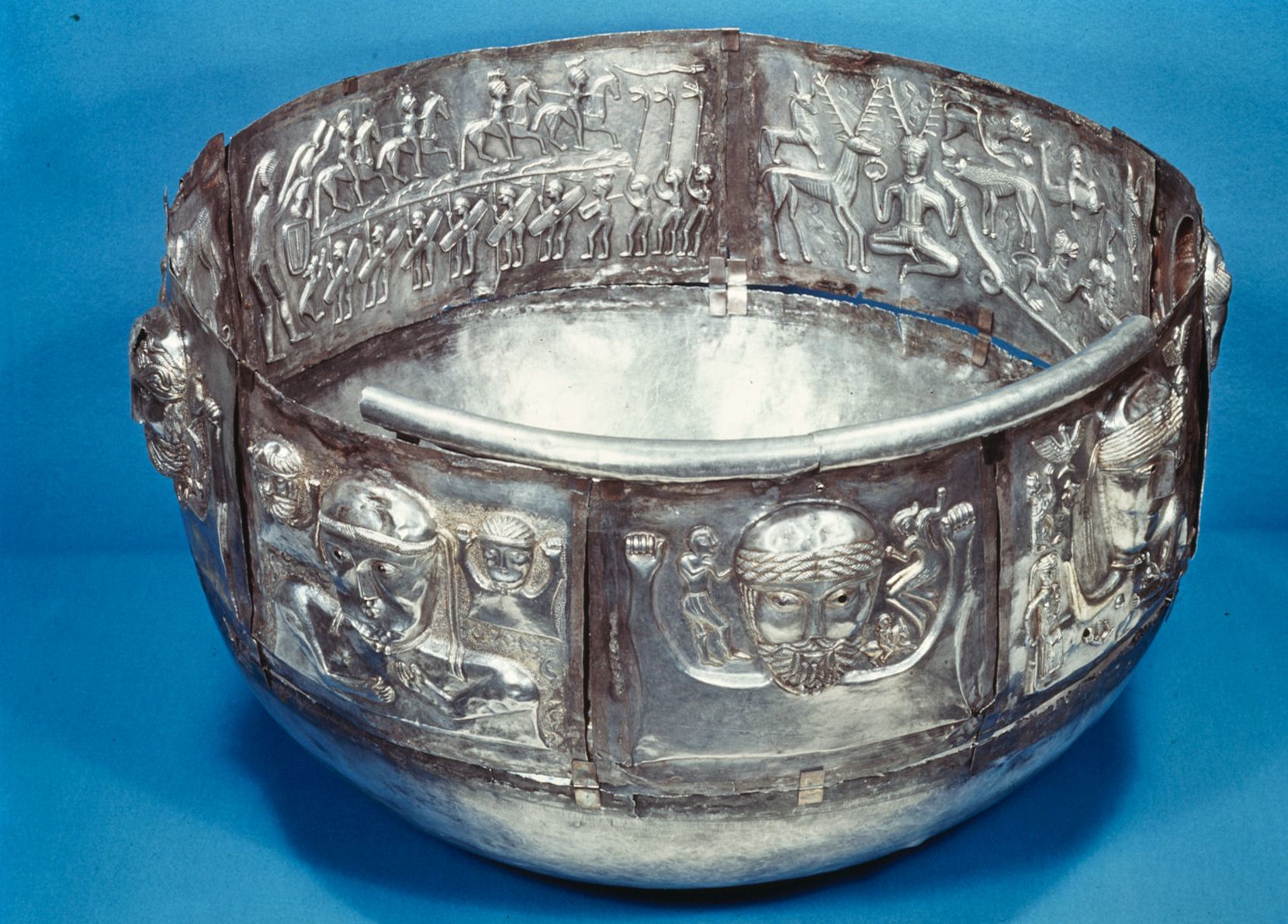
Gundestrup Caudron, Denmark, 2nd-1st century BC

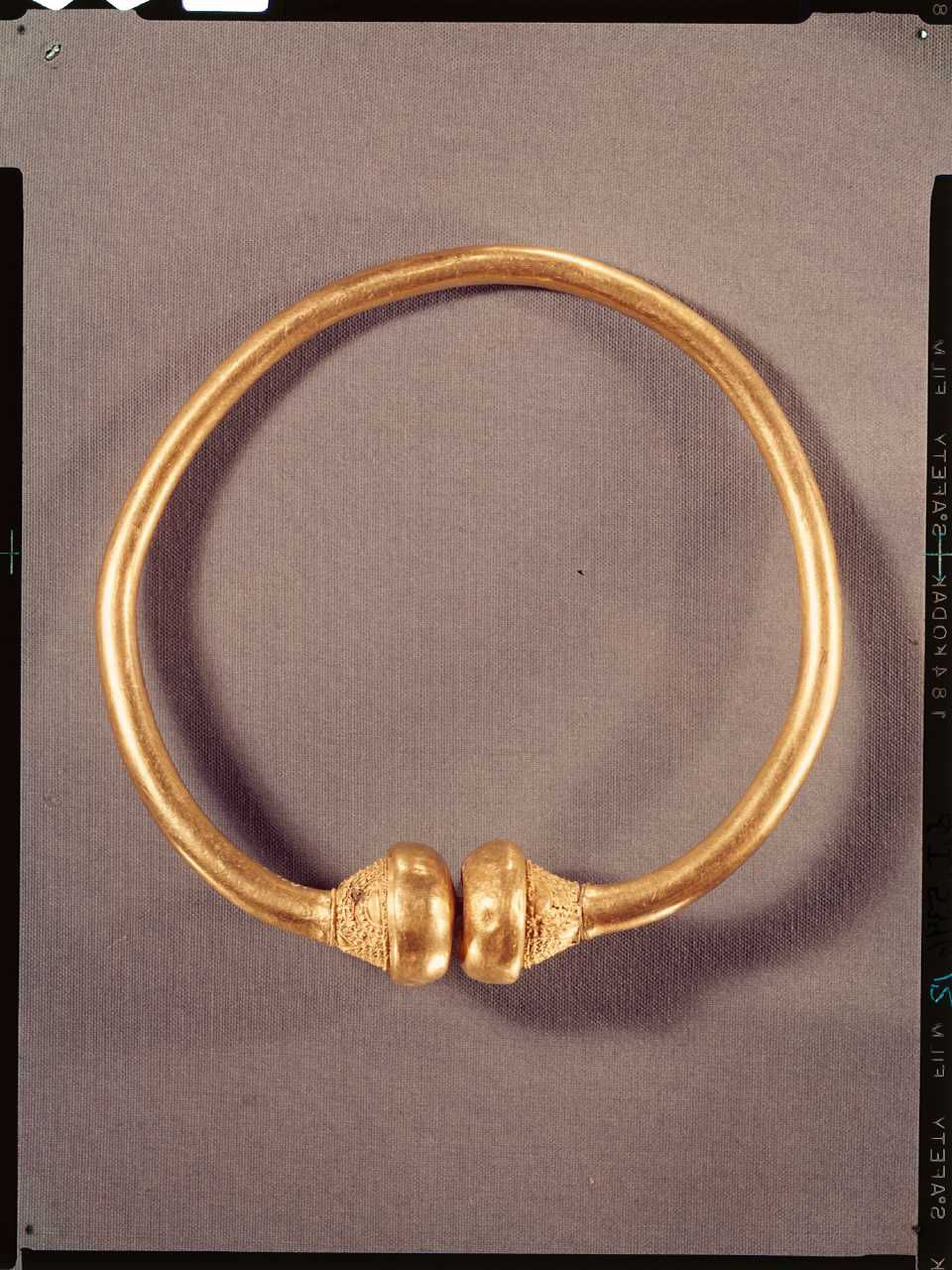
Gold torc, Denmark

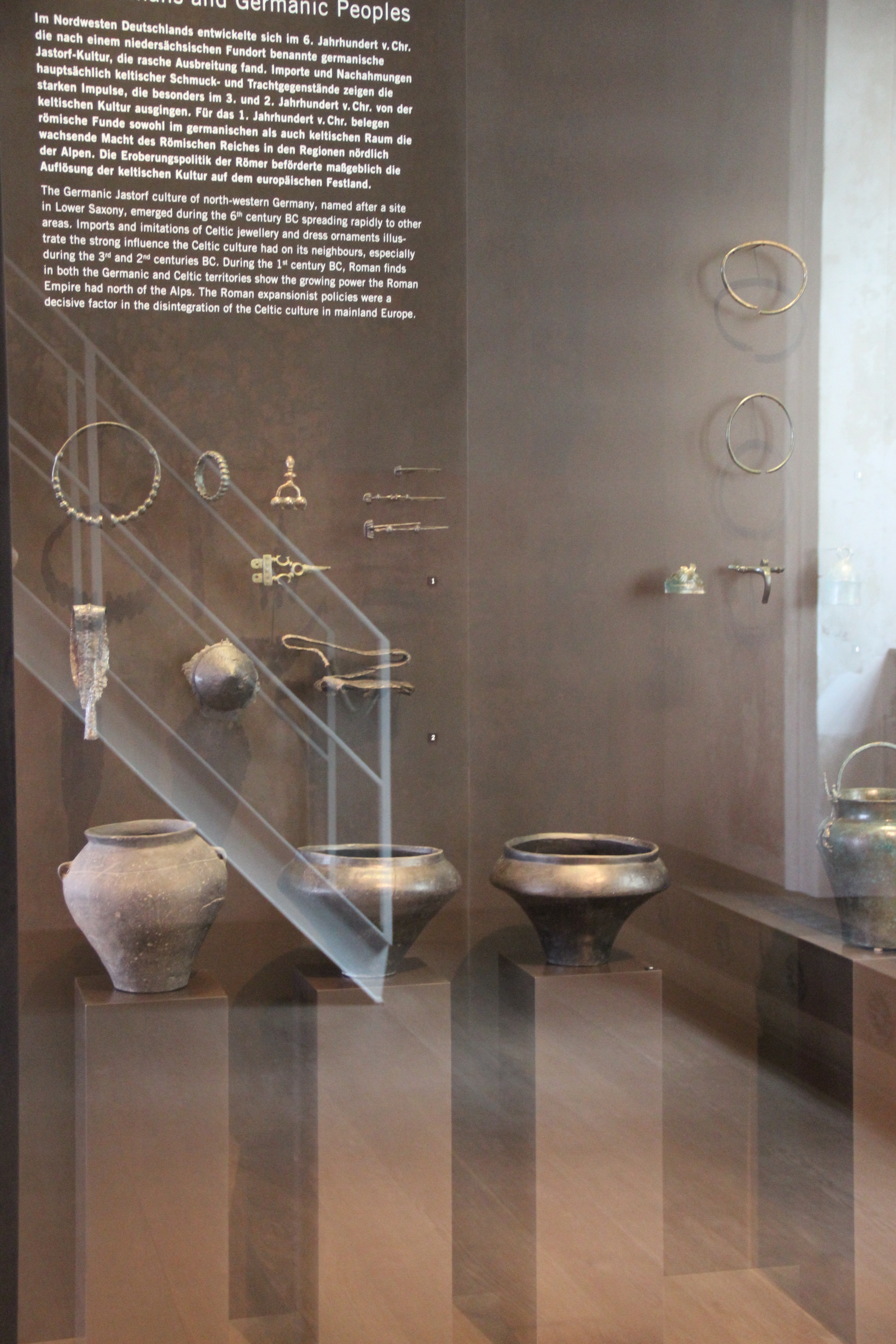
Jastorf culture artefacts, northern Germany

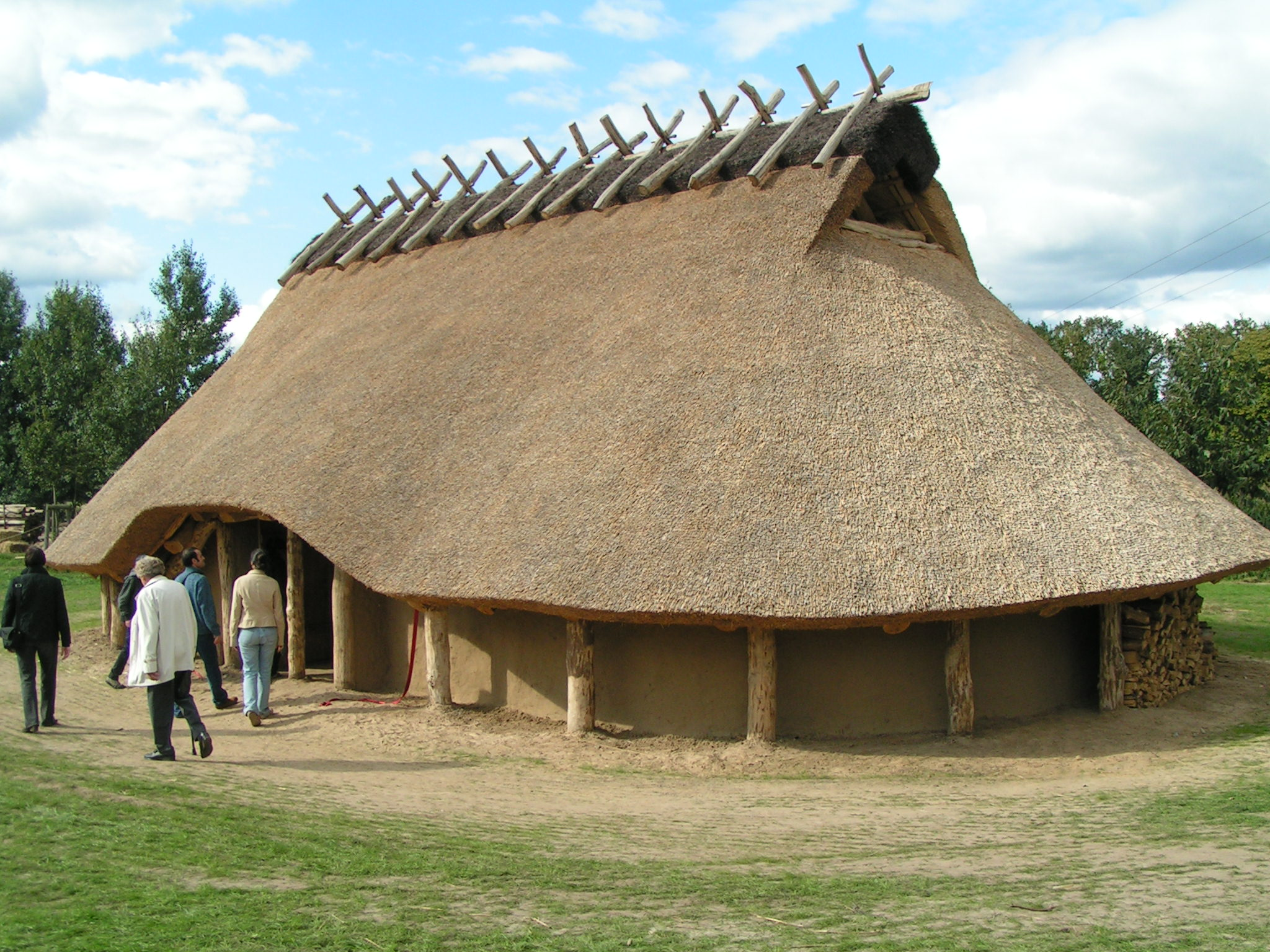
Reconstructed Iron age house in Lower Saxony, Germany, c. 300 BC

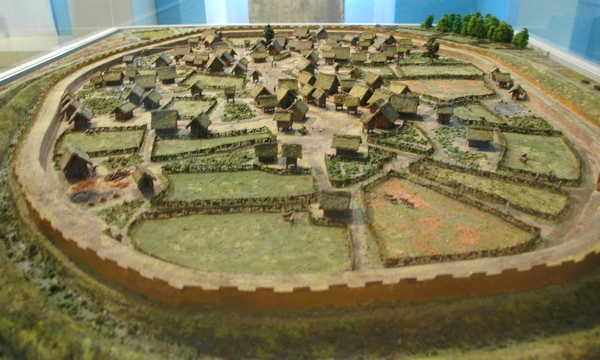
Fortified settlement of the Eburones, Germany, c. 50 BC

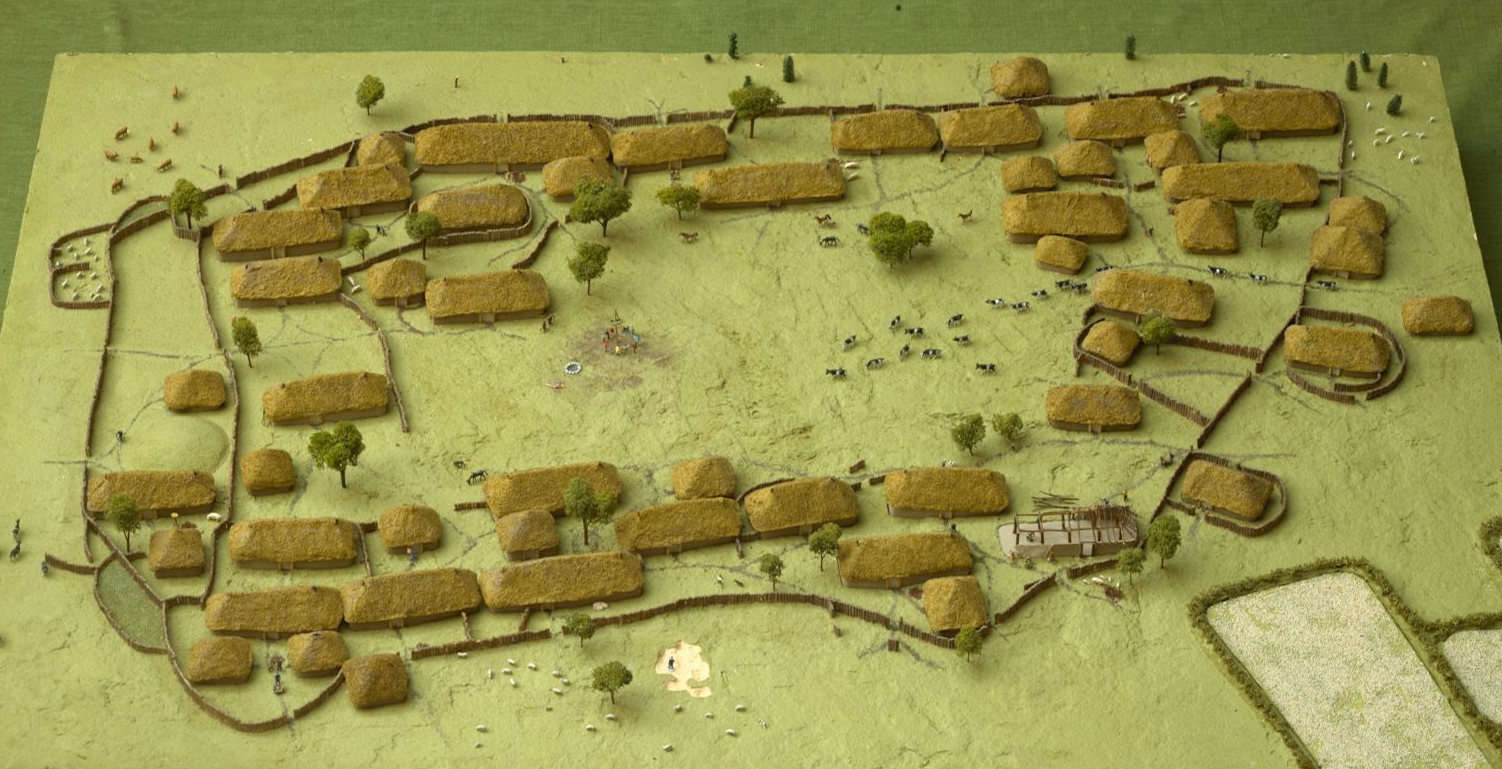
Model of Hodde Iron Age village, Denmark, c. 100 BC

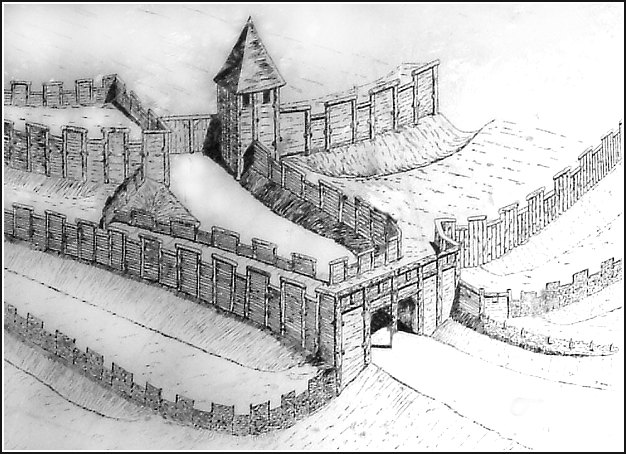
Reconstruction of fortifications at Erdenburg, Germany

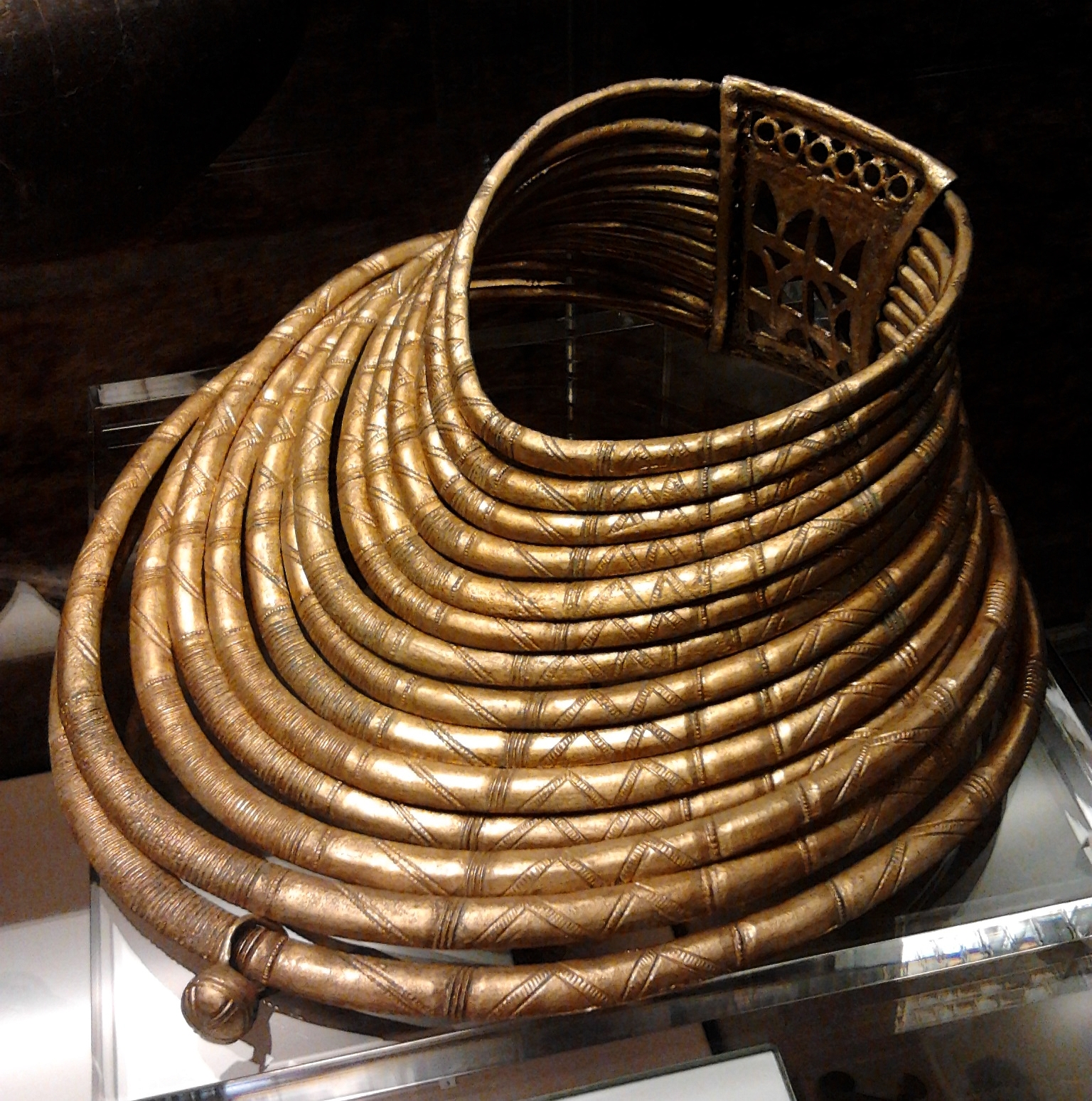
Bronze pectoral, Pomeranian culture, Poland

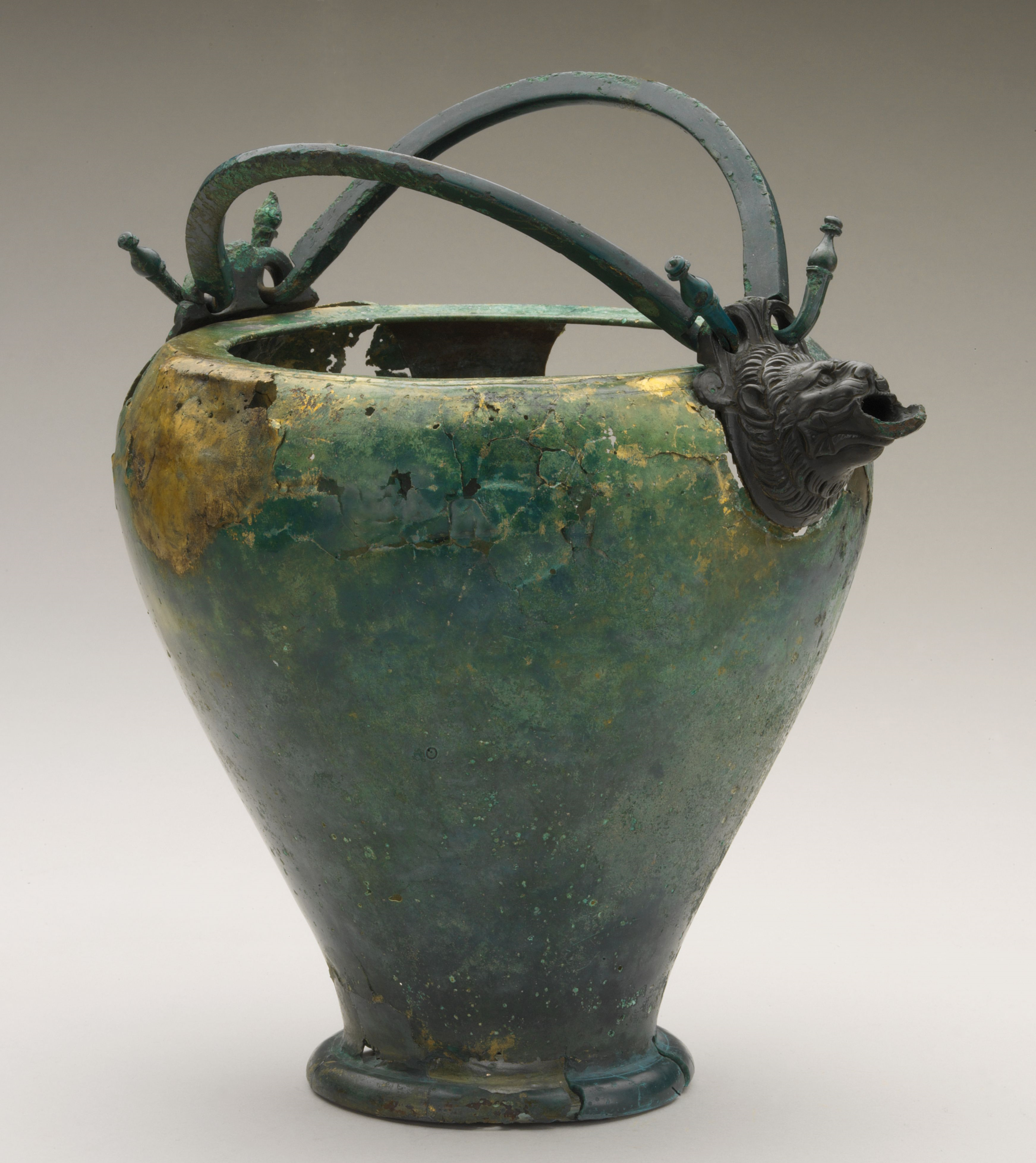
Etruscan situla from Tinghøj, Denmark, 1st century BC

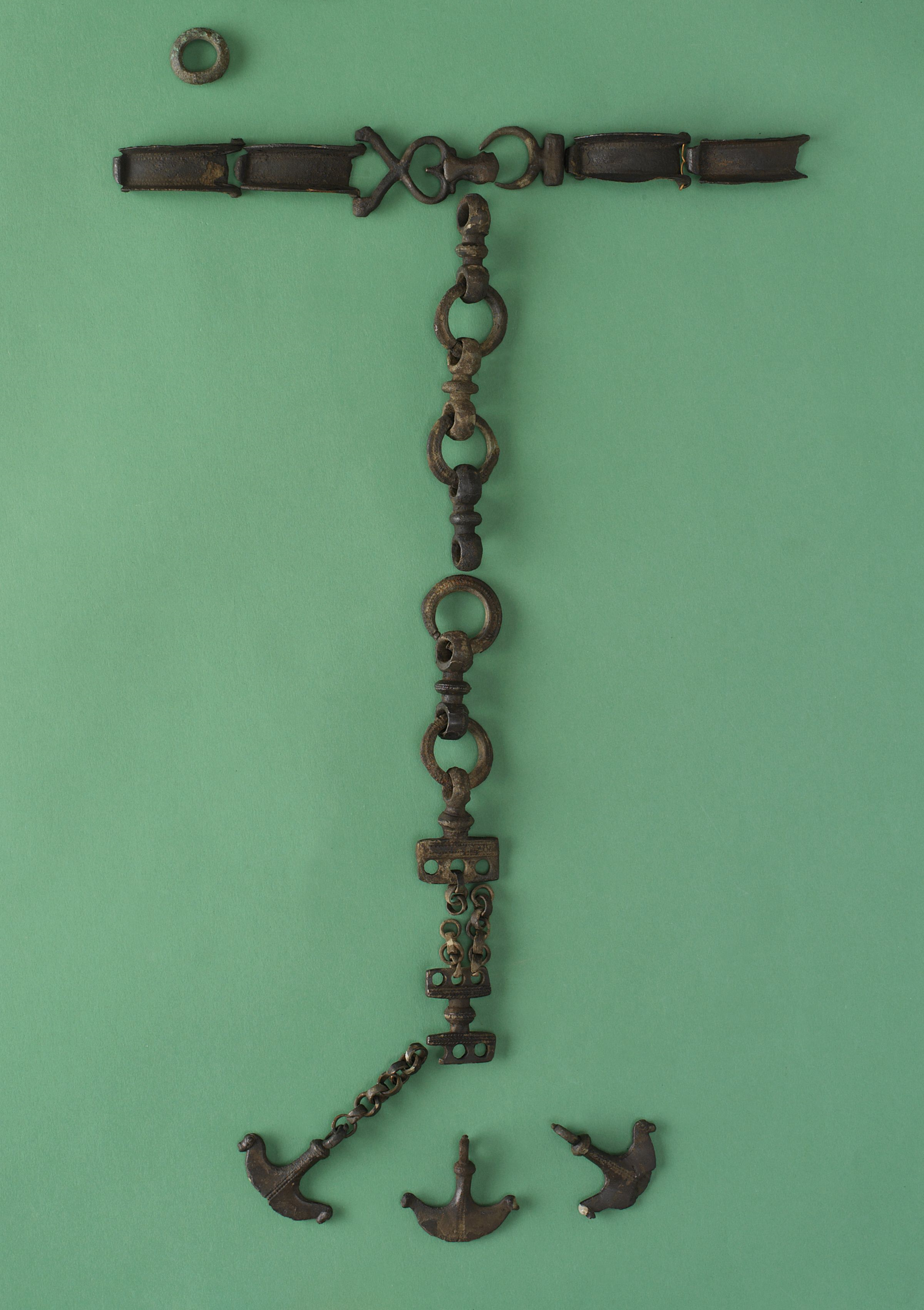
Metal belt from Skjoldborg, Denmark

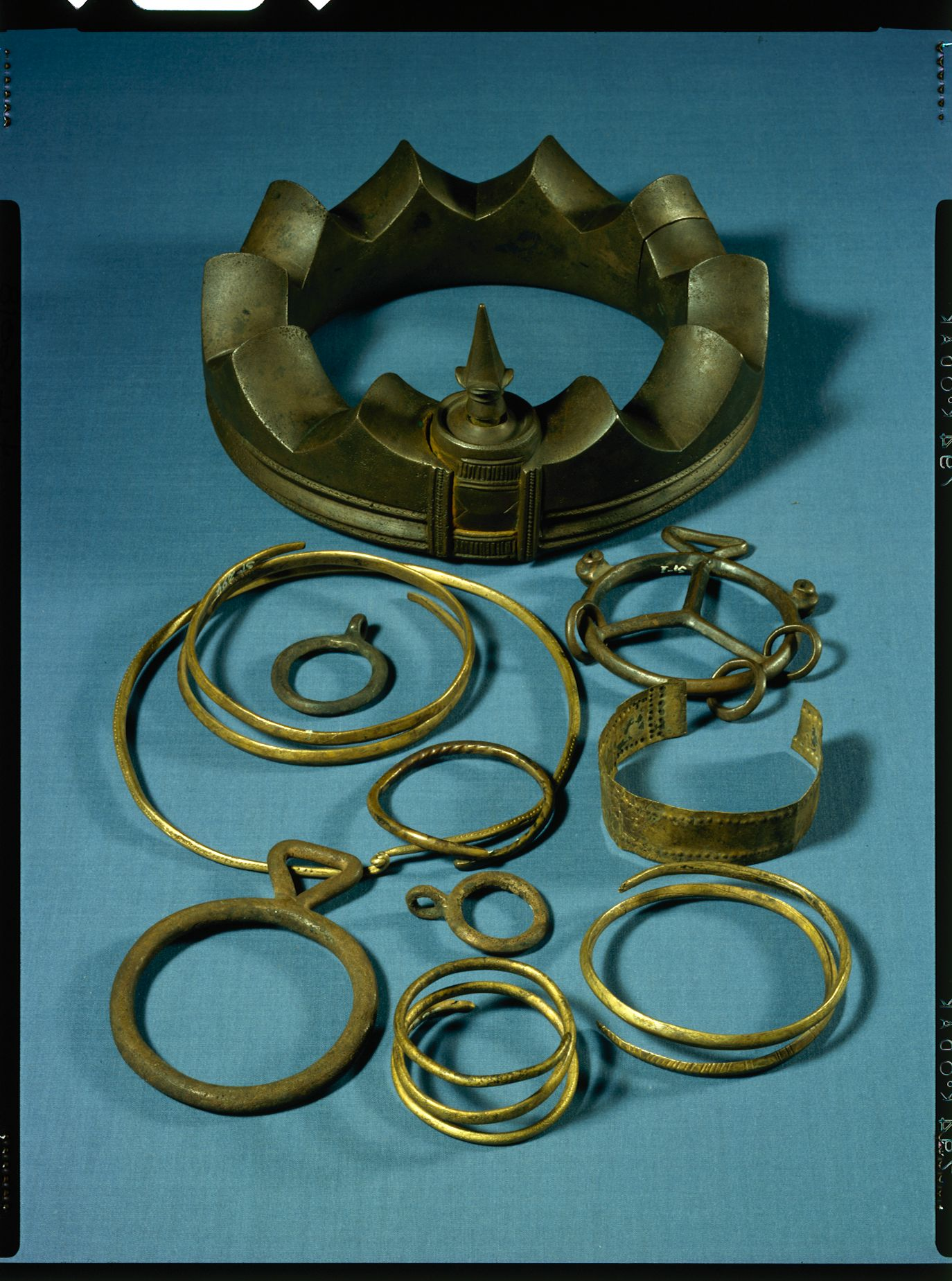
'Kronehalsring', Jastorf culture, Denmark

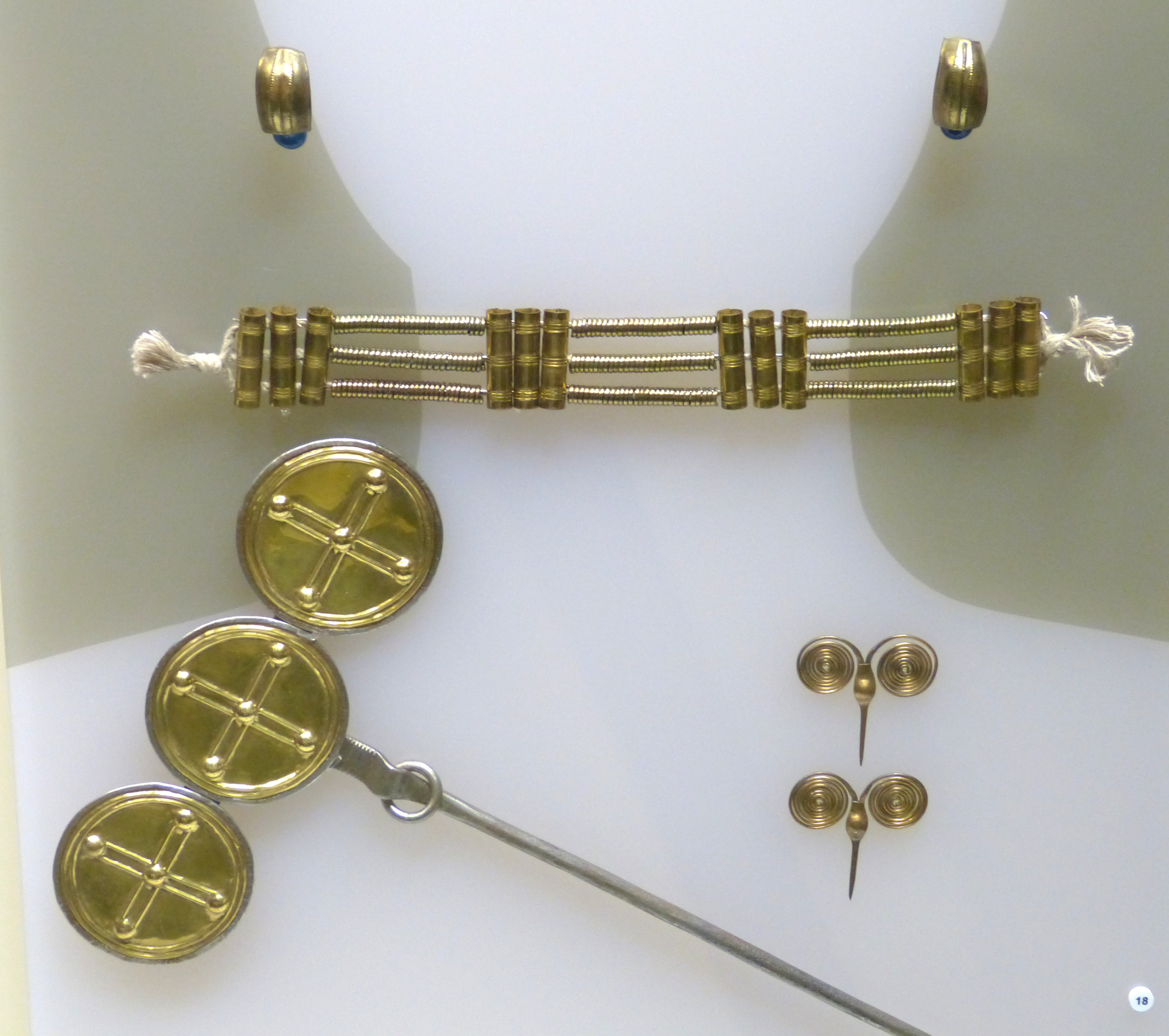
Gold ornaments, Jastorf culture, Germany

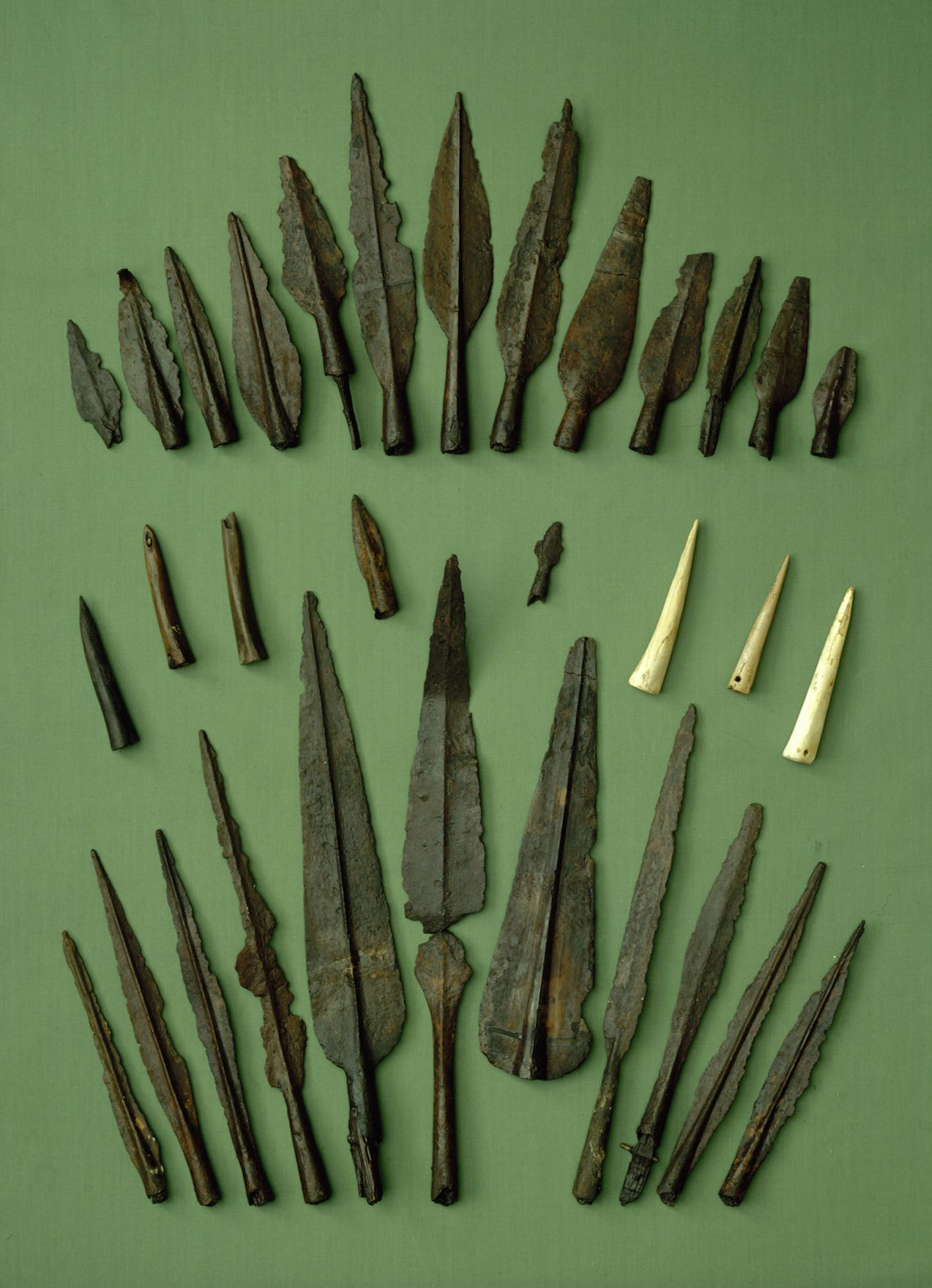
Iron spears from Hjortspring, Denmark

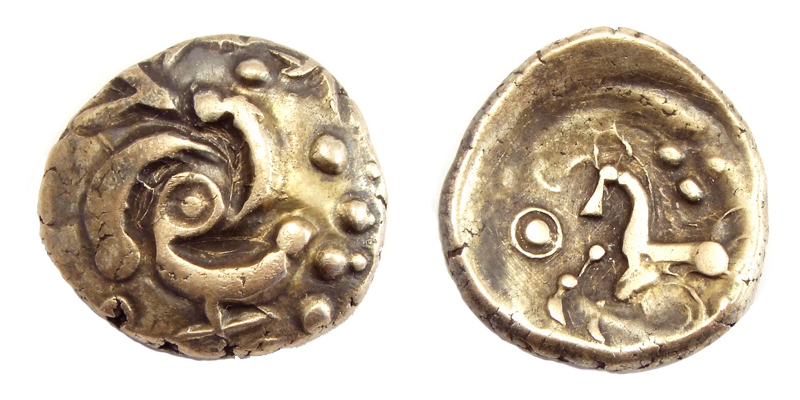
Gold coin of the Eburones, Netherlands

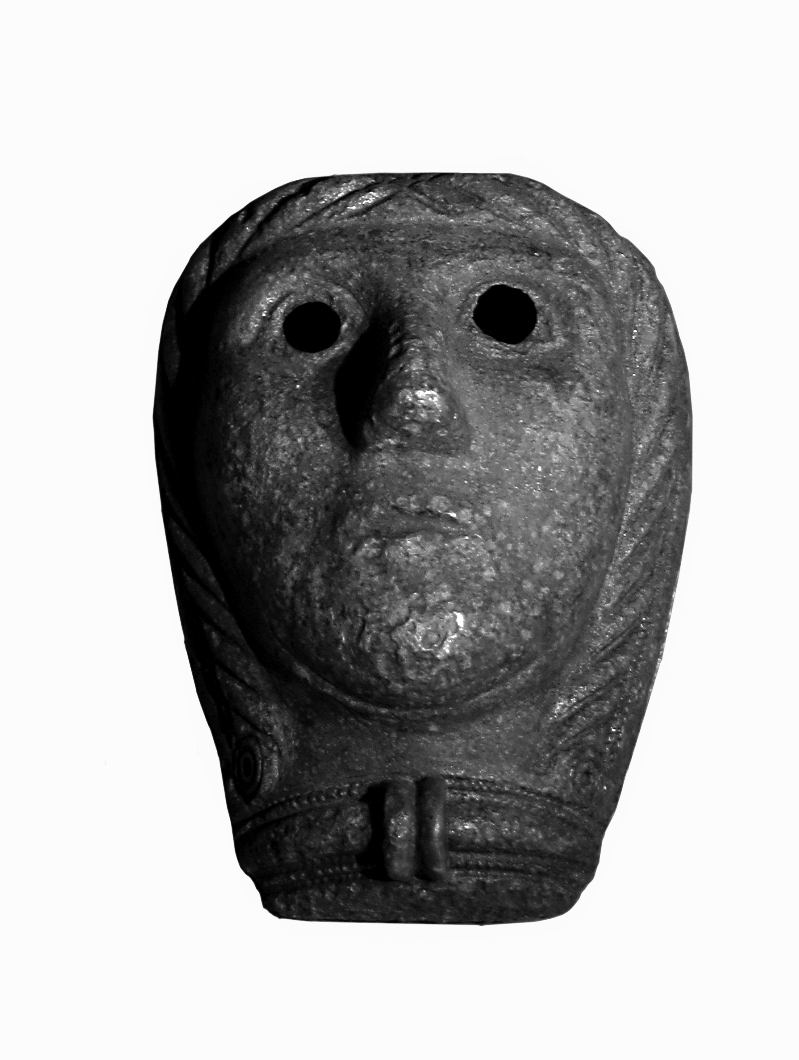
Bronze mask, Sweden

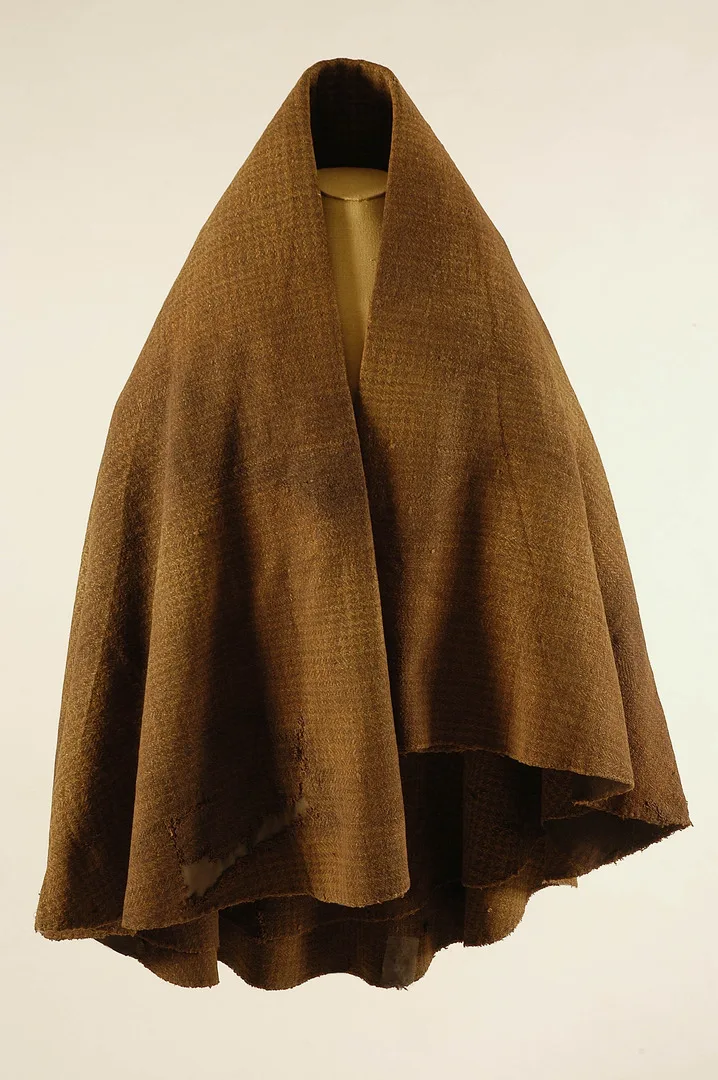
The Gerum Cloak, Sweden, 360–100 BC

=== Roman Iron Age ===
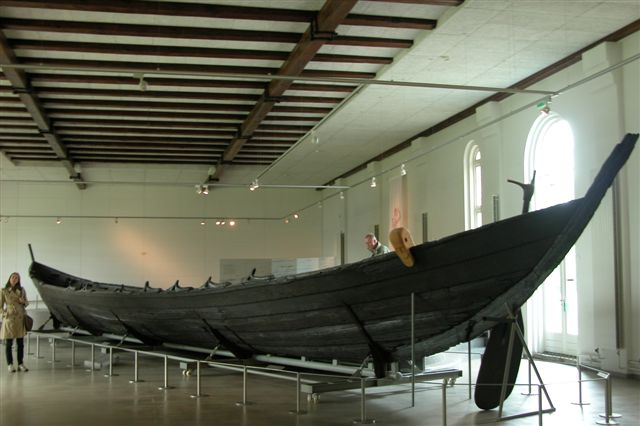
The Nydam boat, Denmark, c. 310 AD

The Roman Iron Age (1–400 AD) is a part of the Iron Age. The name comes from the hold that the Roman Empire had begun to exert on the Germanic tribes of Northern Europe.

In Scandinavia, there was a great import of goods, such as coins, vessels, bronze images, glass beakers, enameled buckles, weapons, etc. Moreover, the style of metal objects and clay vessels was markedly Roman. Objects such as shears and pawns appear for the first time. In the 3rd and 4th centuries, some elements are imported from Germanic tribes that had settled north of the Black Sea, possibly including the runes.

The oldest known runic inscriptions include those found on the Vimose comb from Denmark (c. 150 AD), and the Hole Runestone from Norway (50 BC--275 AD). Another possible example is the Meldorf fibula from Germany, dating from the first half of the 1st century AD.

There are also many bog bodies from this time in Denmark, Schleswig and southern Sweden. Together with the bodies, there are weapons, household wares and clothes of wool. The prime burial tradition was cremation, but the third century and thereafter saw an increase in inhumation. Great ships made for rowing have been found from the 4th century in Nydam Mose in southern Denmark.

The combined population of Denmark, Norway and Sweden in 1 AD is estimated have been approximately 750,000.

Norway's first royal seat was founded at Avaldsnes in c. 200 AD. Other important elite settlements were established in Norway at Hove in 200 AD, and at Øvre Eiker in the 3rd century. The Gudme Hall complex, a ruling elite residence and cult site, was built in Denmark in the mid-3rd century. At Uppåkra in Sweden, the largest Iron Age settlement in Scandinavia developed from c. 200 AD onwards. A wooden temple was built at Uppåkra in the 3rd century and continued to be used and rebuilt over 600 years, into the early Viking Age. The remains of a temple are also known from Hedegård in Denmark dating from the early 1st century AD. Gamla Uppsala in Sweden developed into an important religious, economic and political centre from the 3rd century onwards. Fortified sites include the Troldborg Ring in Denmark, dating from 100-200 AD. Agricultural villages such as Vorbasse in Denmark are also known from this period (200-400 AD).

A number of 'princely graves' of Germanic elites are known from the second half of the Roman Iron Age. These are exceptionally rich burials often marked by elaborate funerary goods like gold jewelry, Roman-made luxury items (such as bronzeware), and high-status weapons. Notable examples include the Hoby grave in Denmark, the graves of Gommern and Marwedel in Germany, and Lubieszewo in Poland. These graves reveal strong cultural and economic ties with the Roman Empire, highlighting the social stratification and wealth of Germanic societies during the Roman period.

Through the 5th and 6th centuries, gold and silver become more and more common. This time saw the ransack of the Roman Empire by Germanic tribes, from which many Scandinavians returned with gold and silver. A new Iron Age had begun in Northern Europe, the Germanic Iron Age.

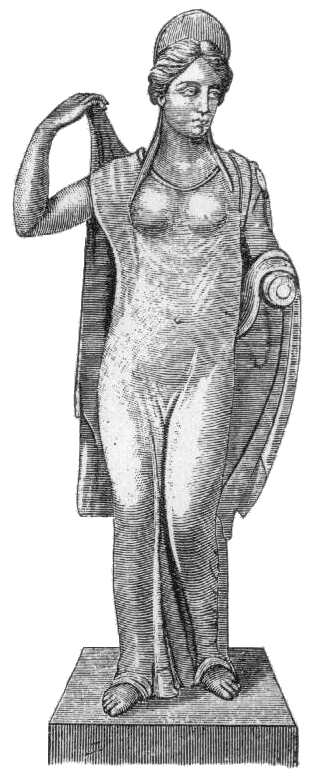
Roman bronze figurine, Öland, Sweden. Possibly Venus or Juno.

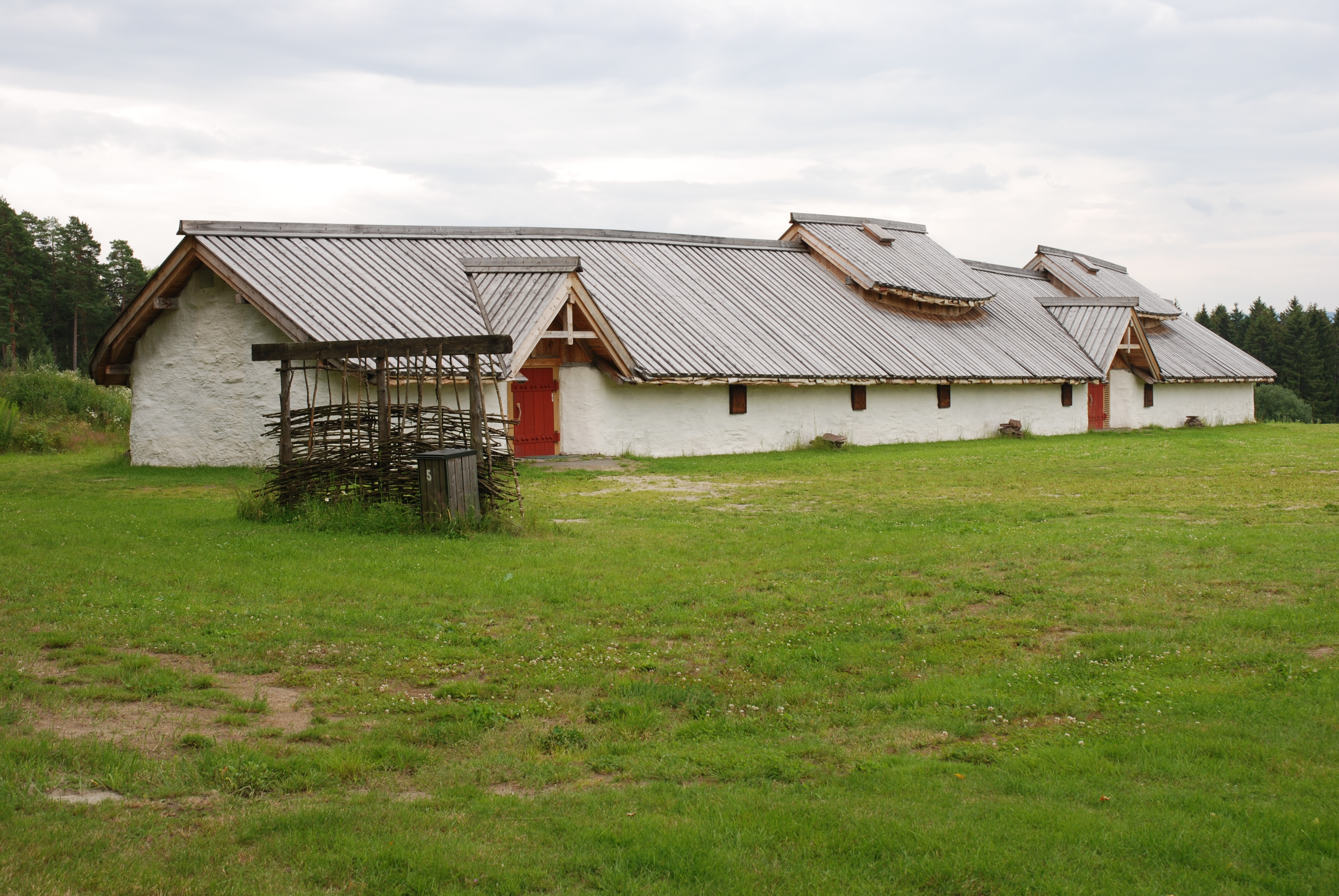
Reconstructed Iron Age hall at Veien, Norway, 1st-2nd century AD

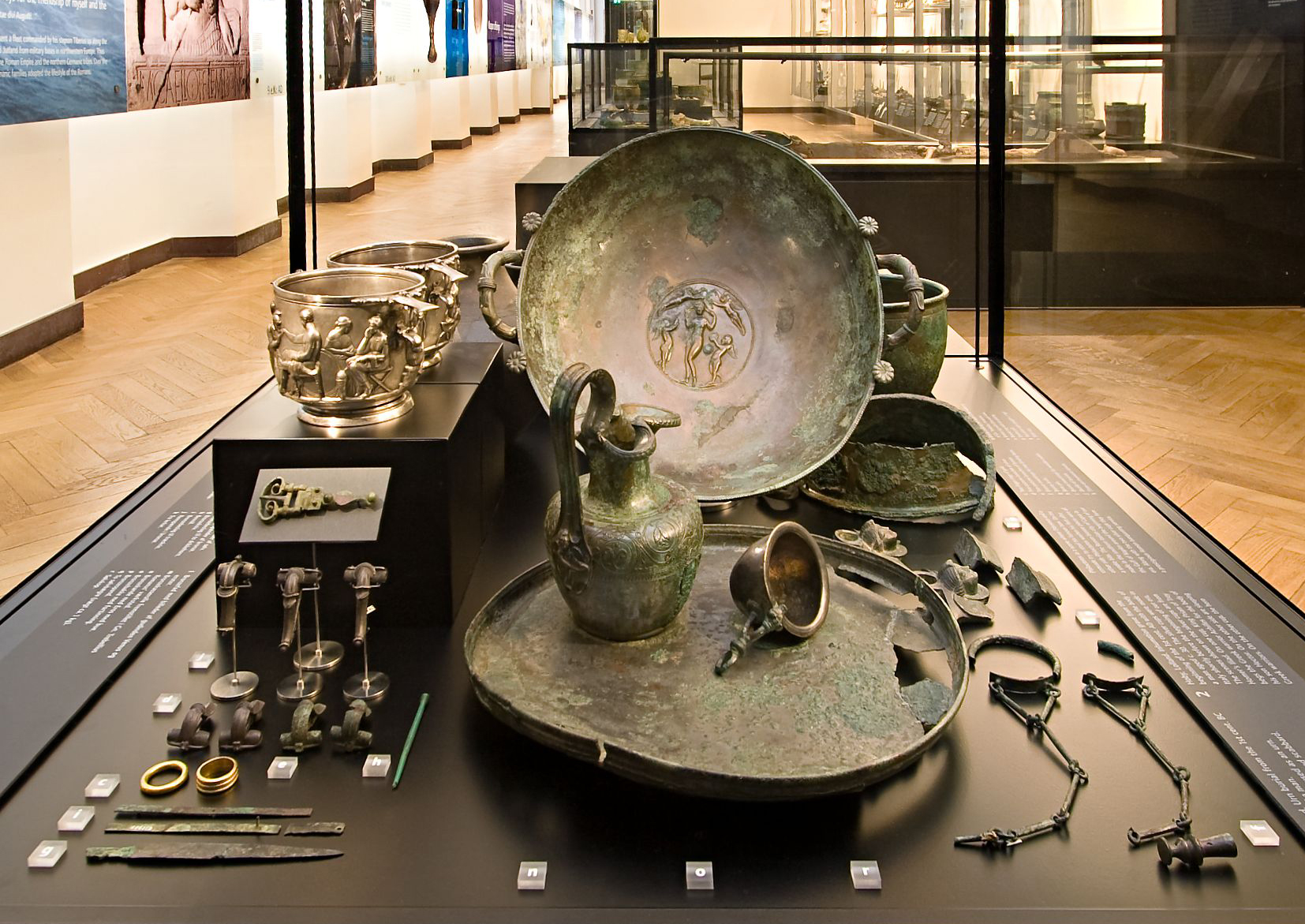
Hoby chieftain's grave, Denmark, 1st c. AD

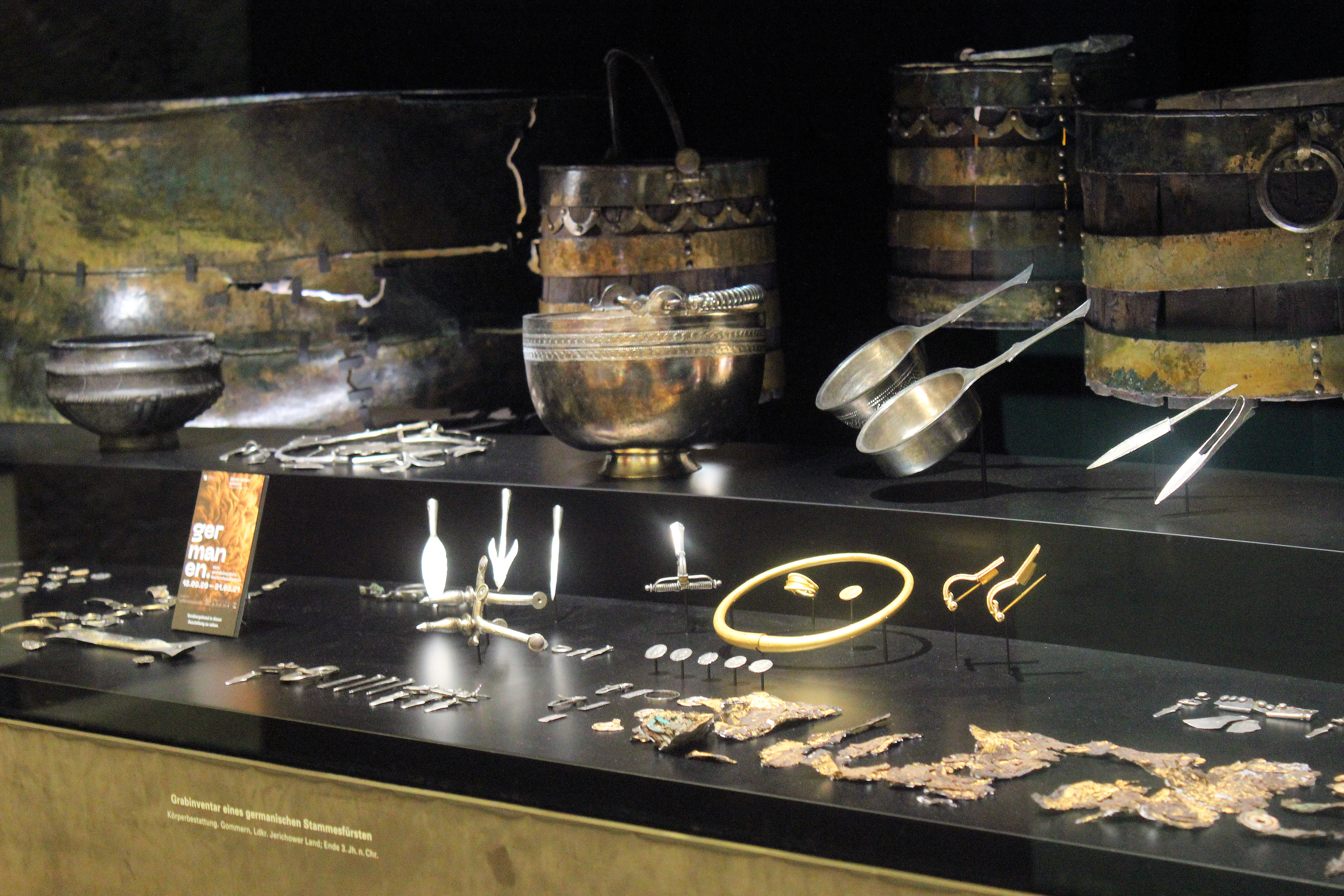
Princely grave of Gommern, Germany, 3rd c. AD

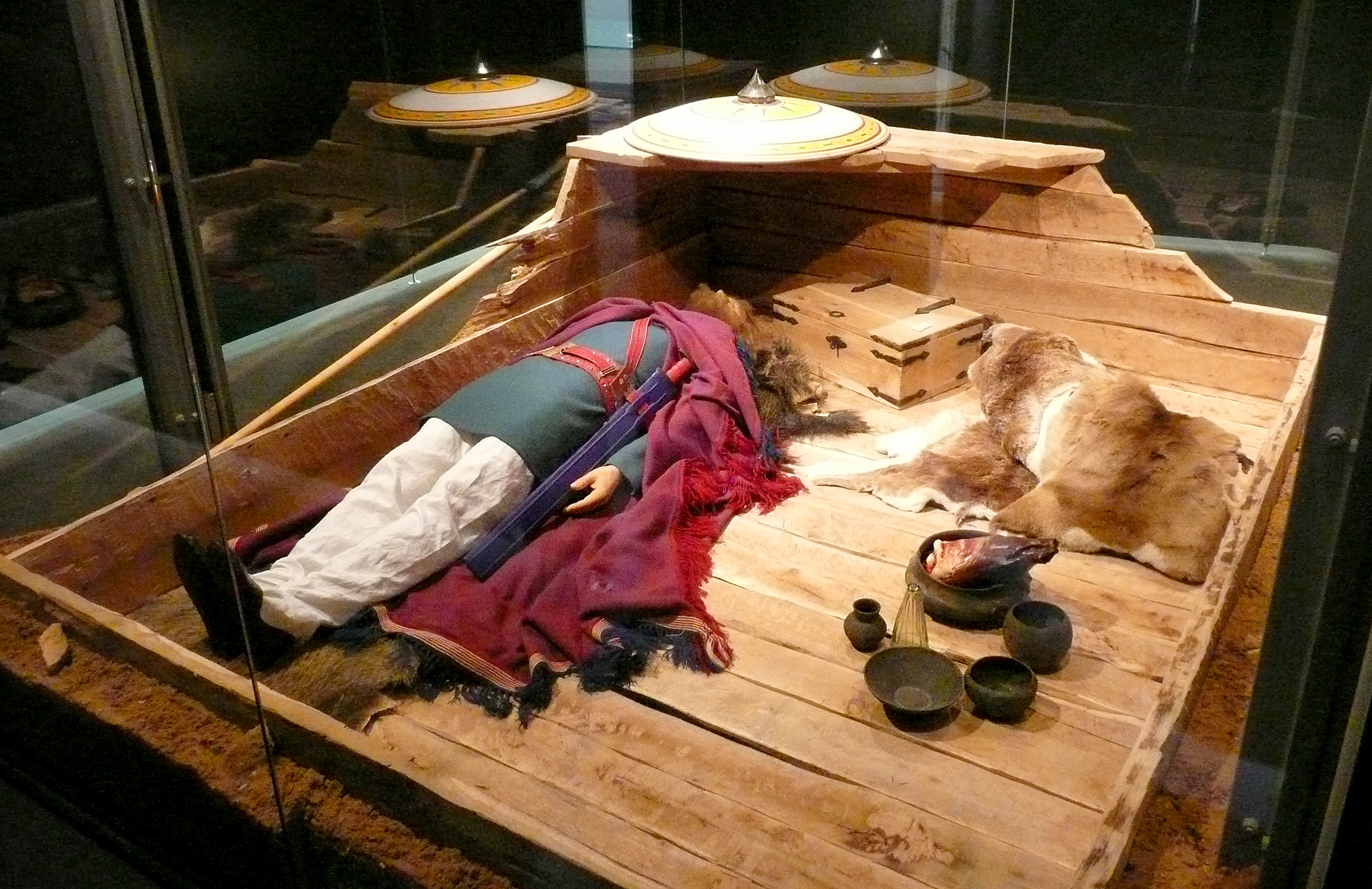
Warrior of Kemathen burial reconstruction, Germany

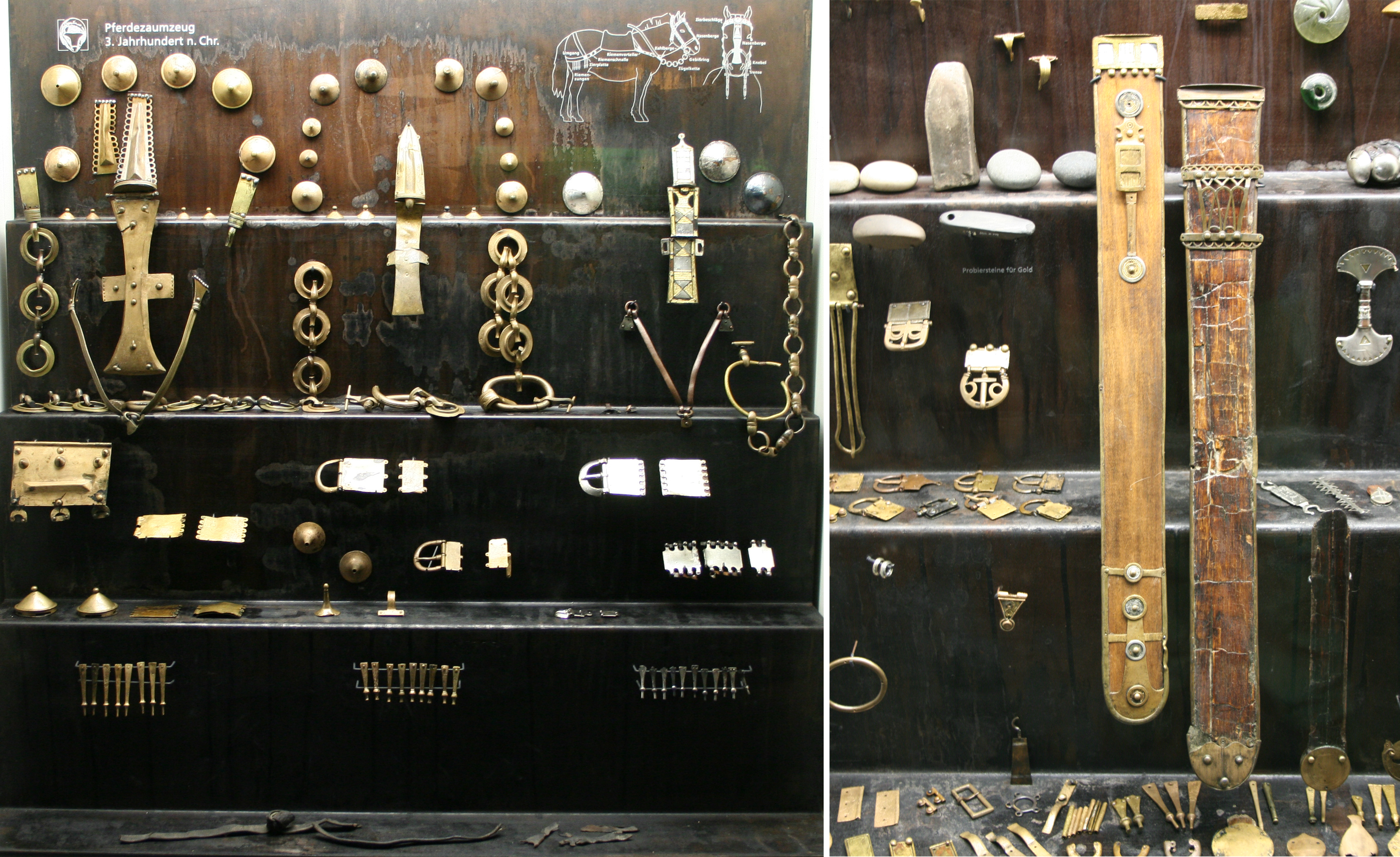
Horse bridle and sword scabbards, Germany, 3rd century AD

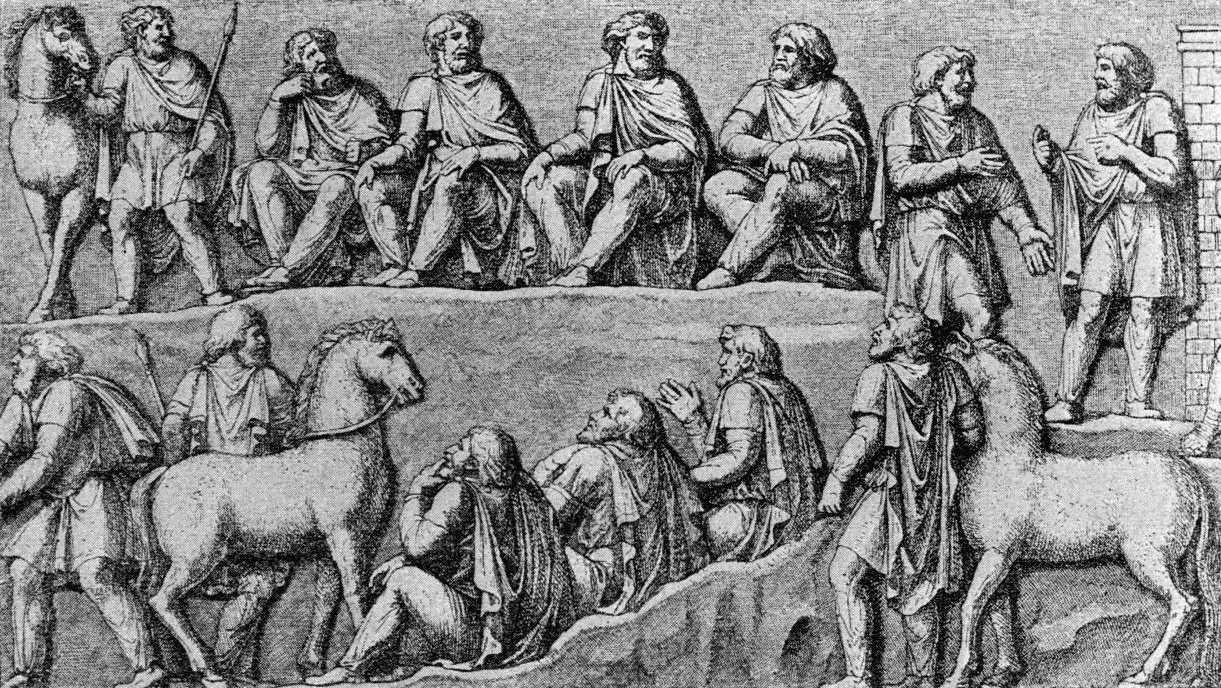
Depiction of a Germanic Thing on the Column of Marcus Aurelius

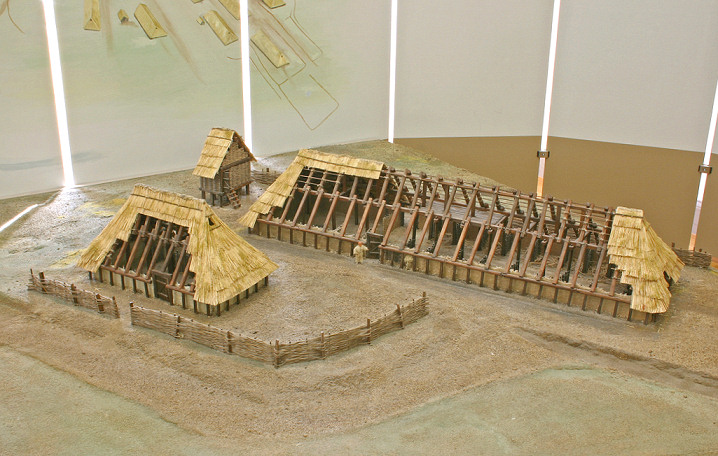
Farm at Feddersen Wierde, north Germany, 1st c. BC–5th c. AD

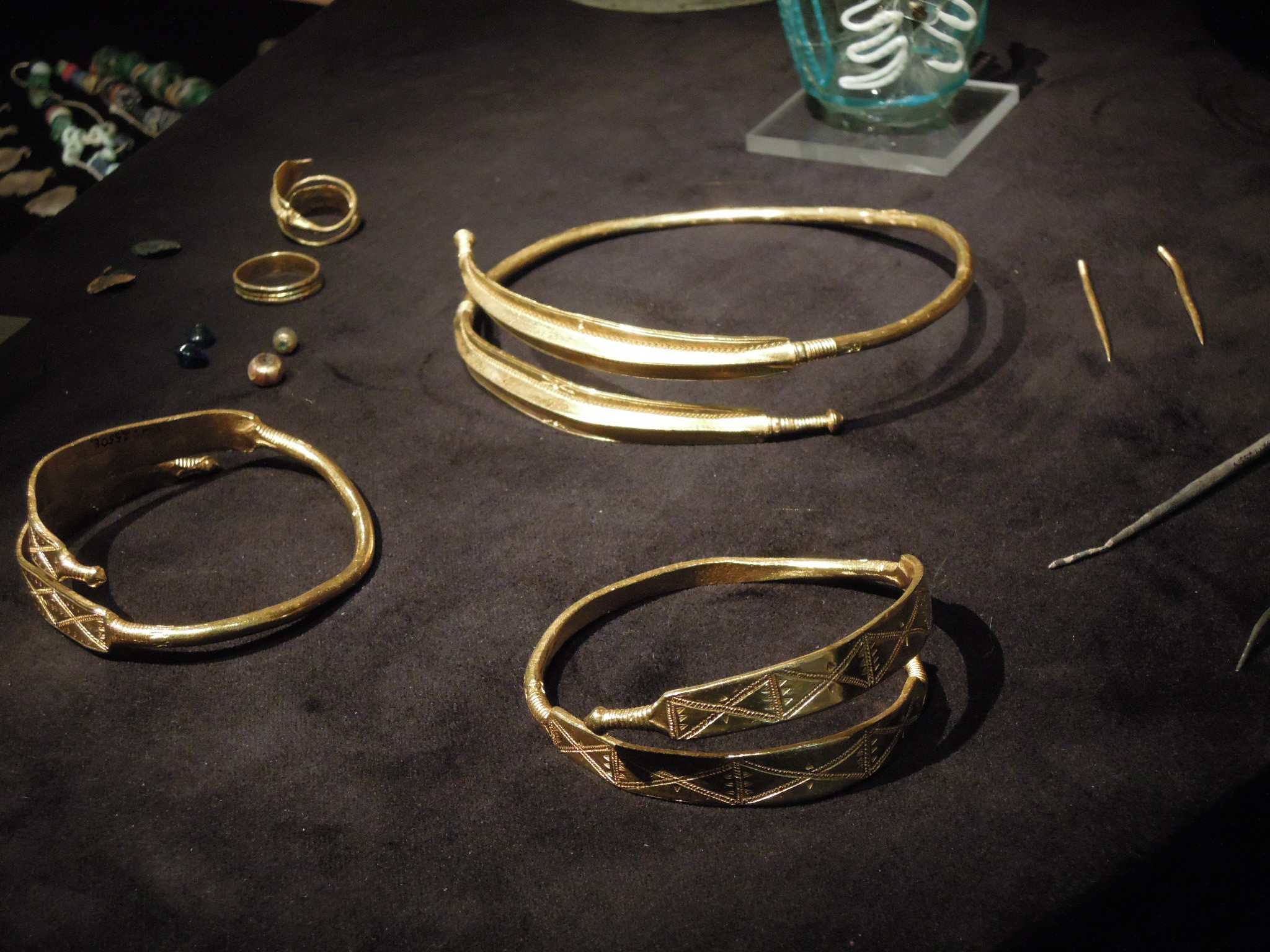
Gold jewellery from Västerås, Sweden, 3rd century

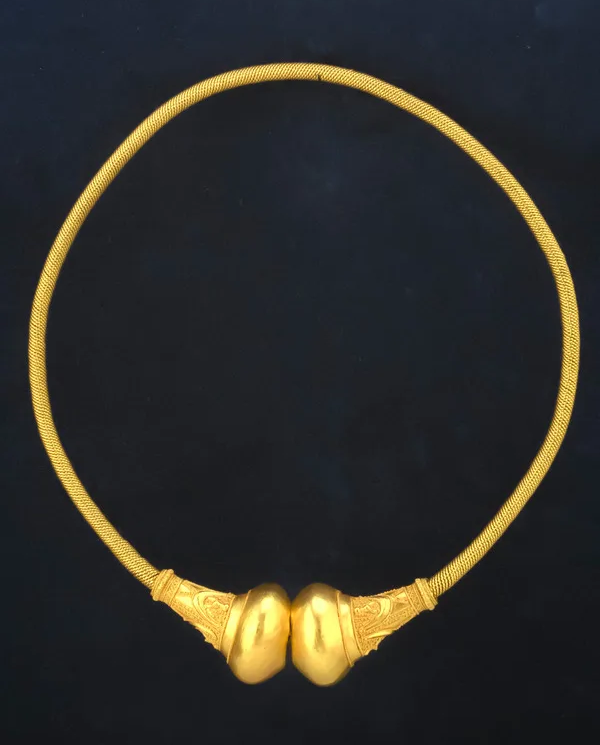
Gold Havor Ring, Sweden, c. 100 AD

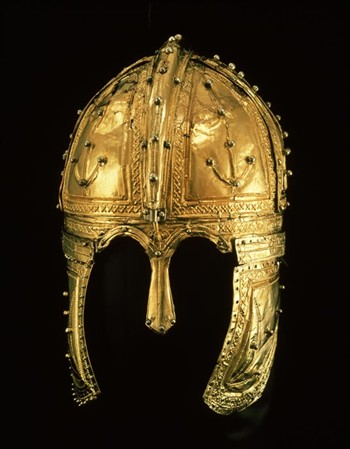
Gilded Roman helmet from Deurne, Netherlands, c. 320 AD

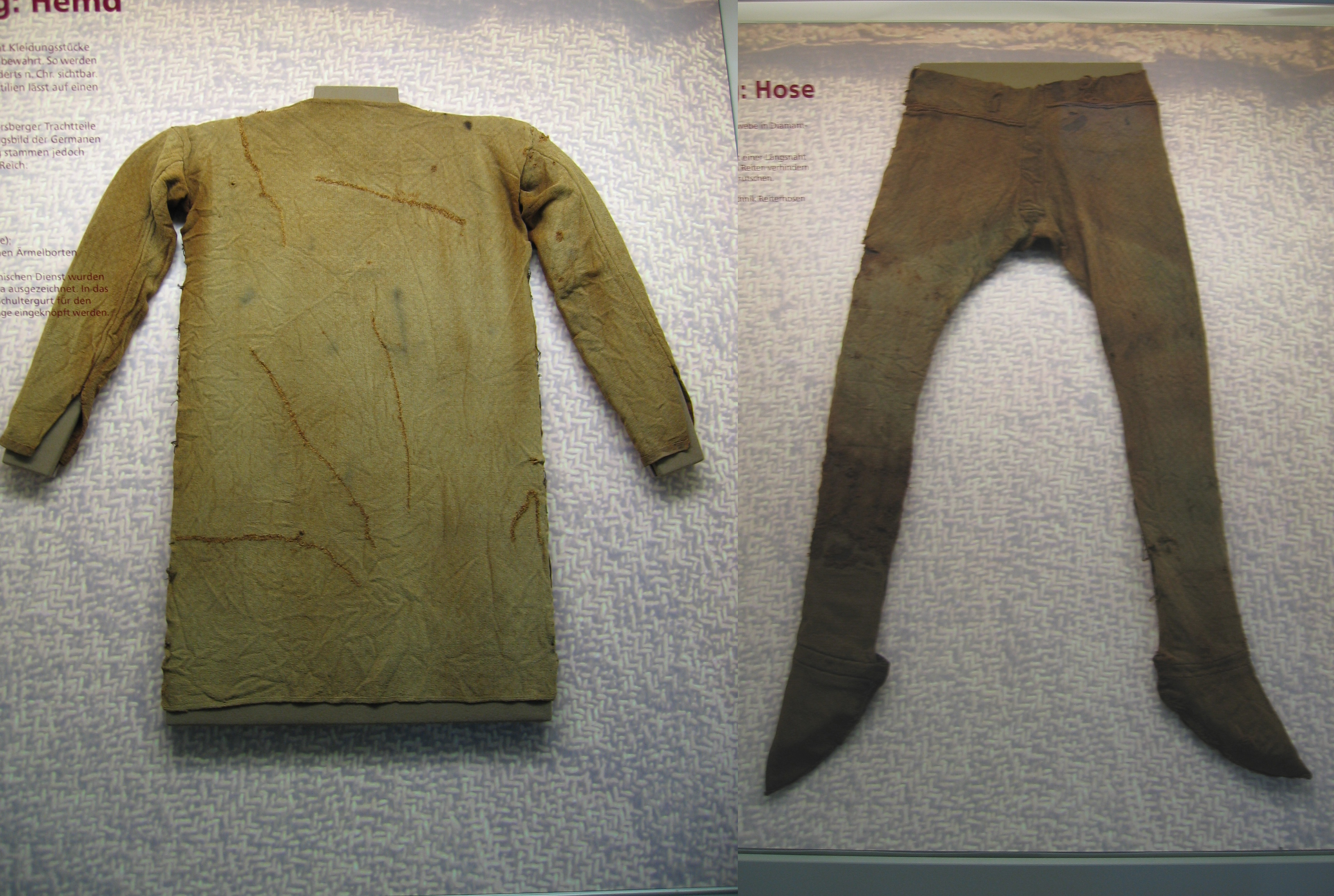
Preserved clothes from Thorsberg moor, Germany, 4th century AD

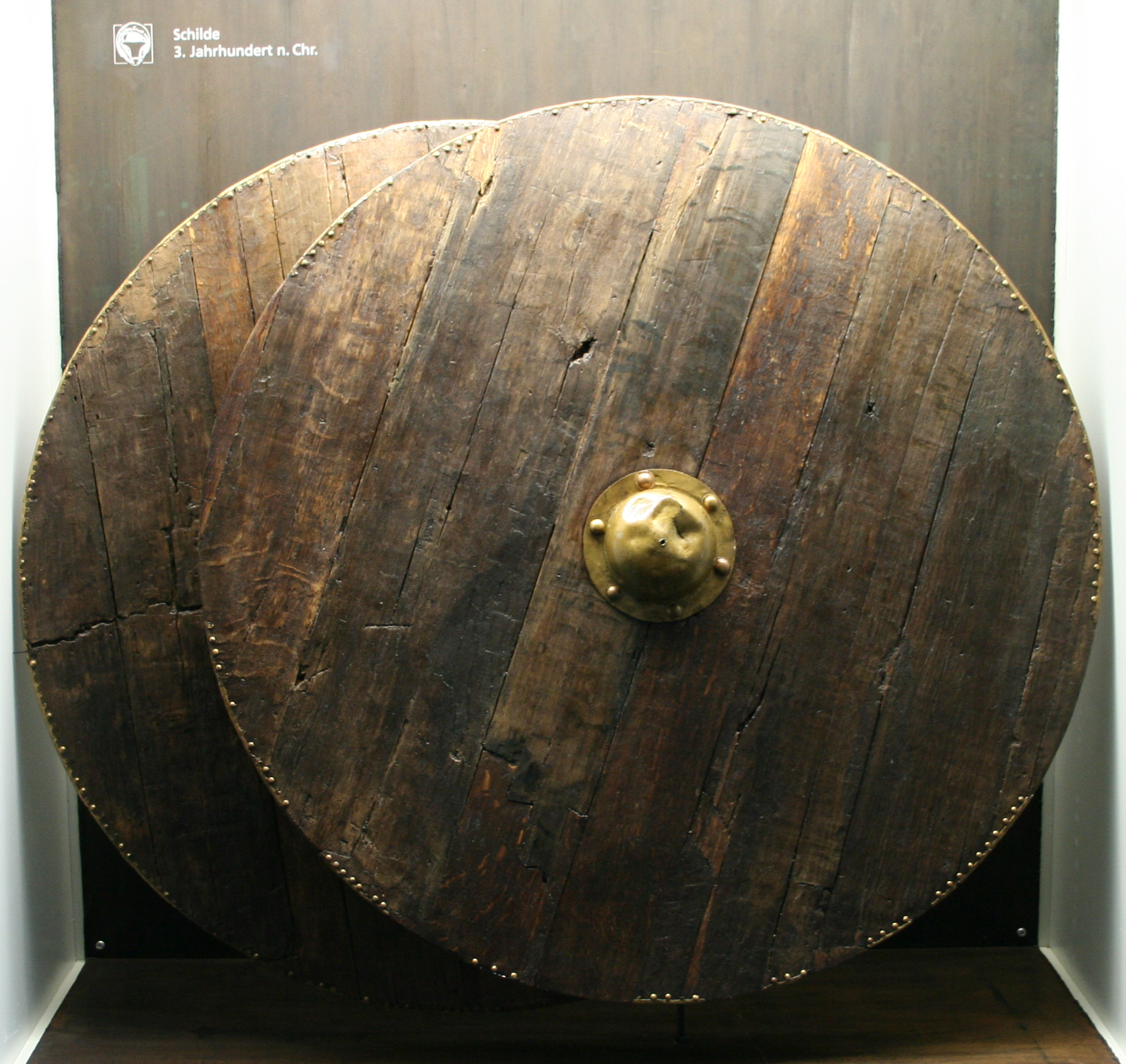
Shields from Thorsberg moor, Germany, 3rd century AD

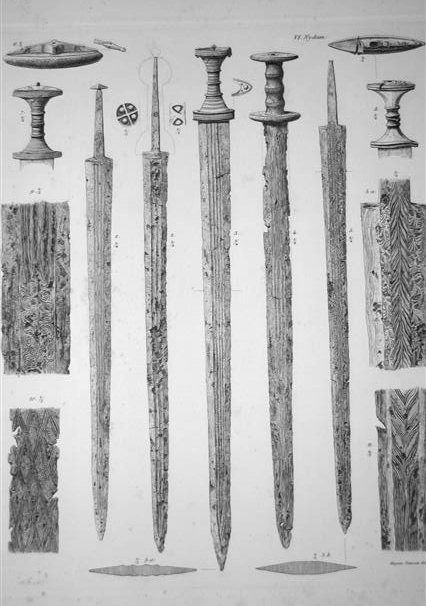
Swords from Nydam Mose, Denmark, 310 AD

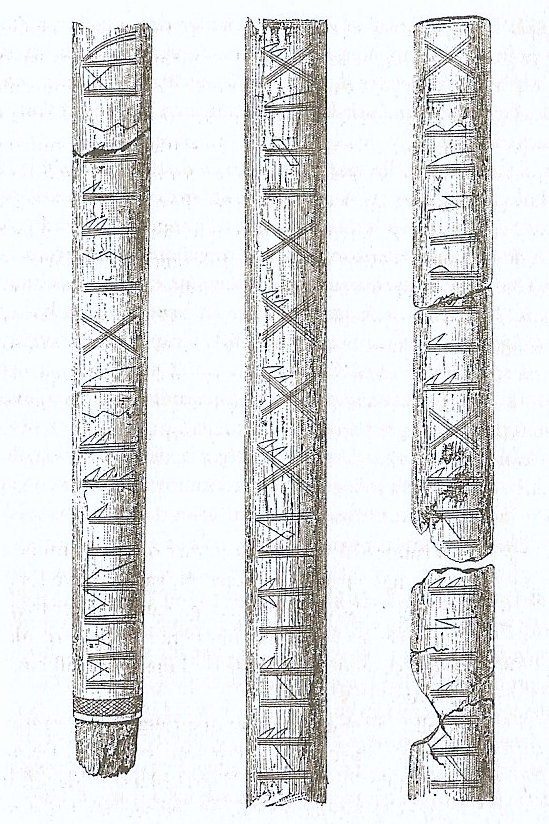
Spear with runic inscription, Kragehul, Denmark, c. 200-500 AD

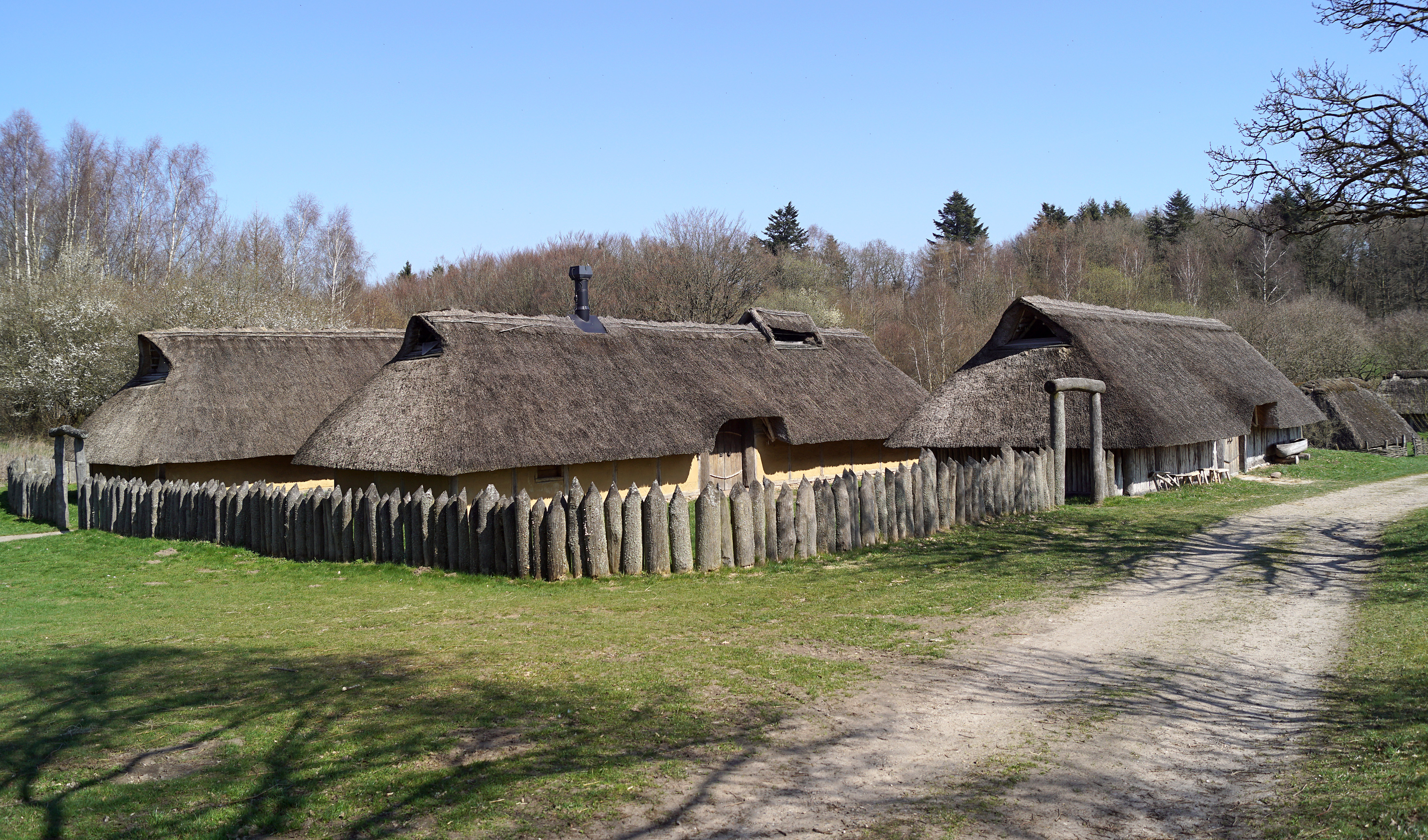
Reconstructed houses at Vingsted, Denmark, 1st century BC-2nd cent. AD

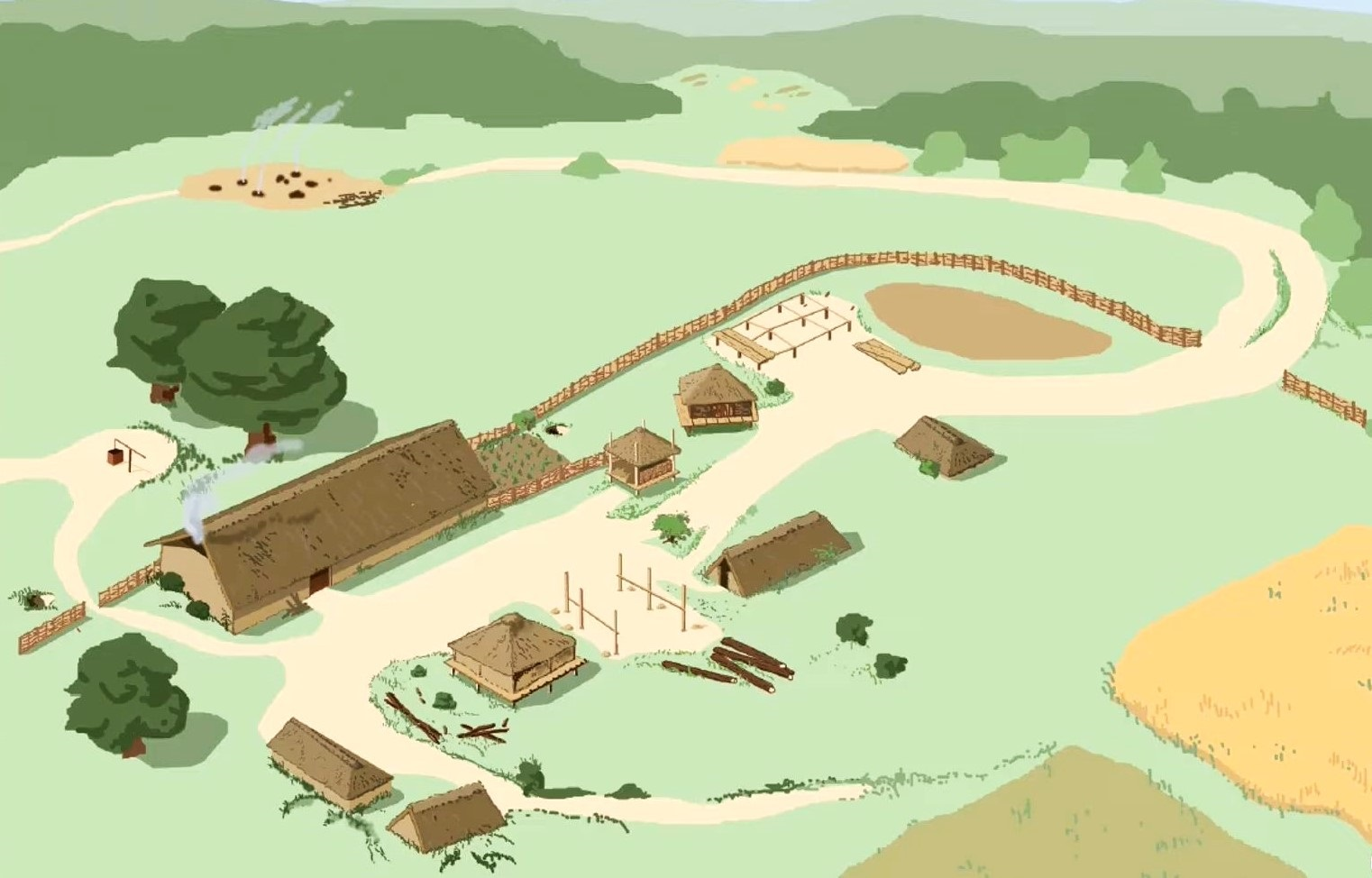
Illustration of a homestead farm, Przeworsk culture, Poland, 3rd-4th cent. AD

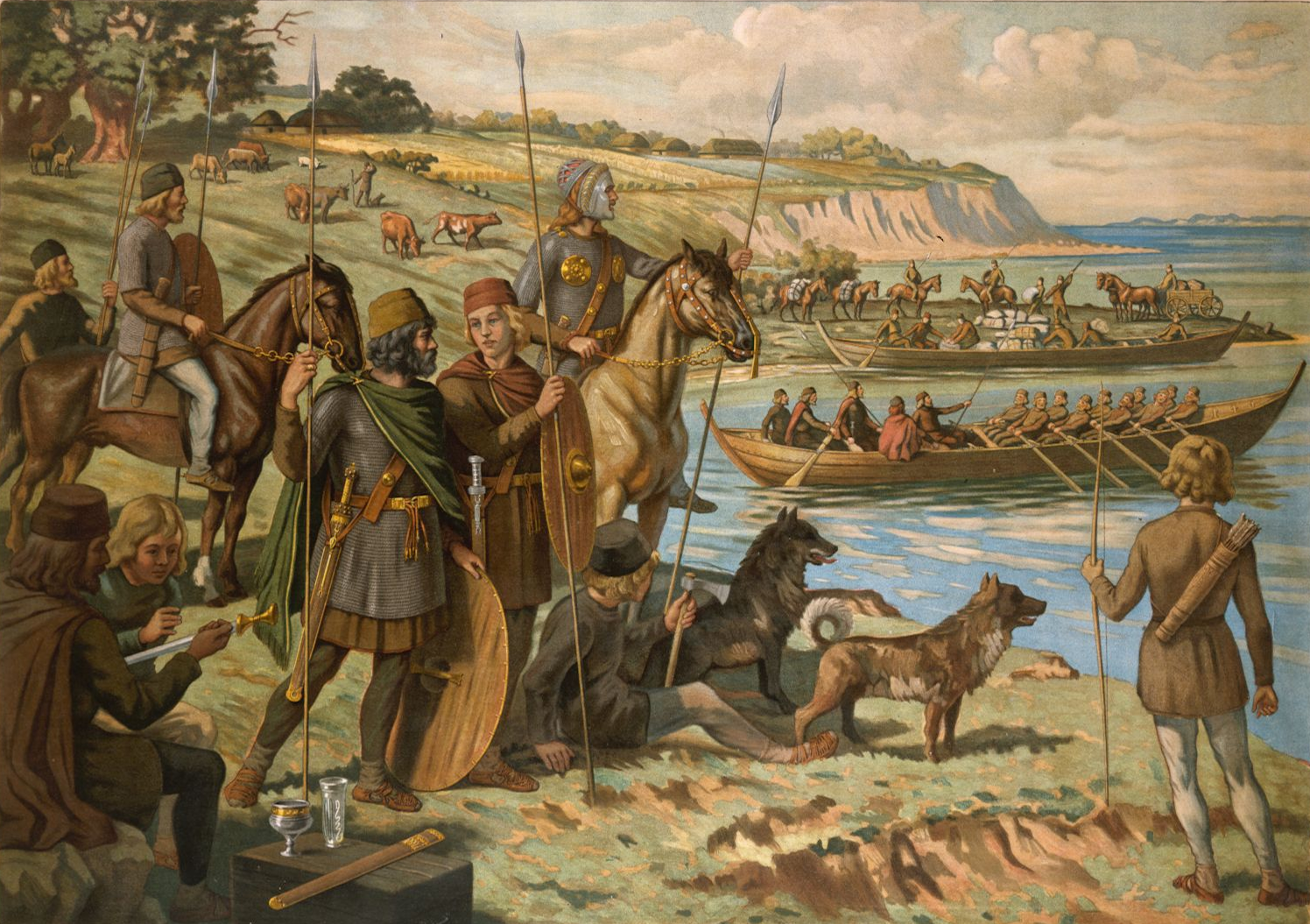
1907 illustration of the Late Roman Iron Age, Denmark

=== Germanic Iron Age ===
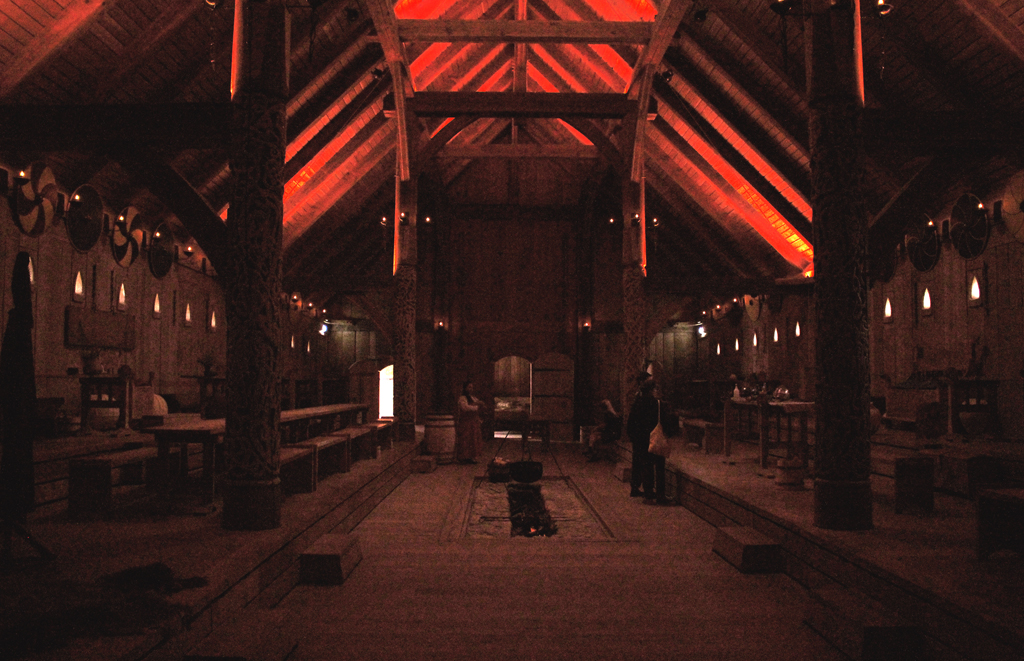
Interior of the King's Hall at Lejre, Denmark, c. 8th century (reconstruction)

The Germanic Iron Age is divided into the Early Germanic Iron Age (EGIA) and the late Germanic Iron Age (LGIA). In Sweden, the LGIA (550–800) is usually called the Vendel era; in Norway and Finland, the Merovinger (Merovingian) Age.

The Germanic Iron Age begins with the fall of the Roman Empire and the rise of the Germanic kingdoms in Western Europe. It is followed, in Northern Europe and Scandinavia, by the Viking Age.

During the decline of the Roman Empire, an abundance of gold flowed into Scandinavia; there are excellent works in gold from this period. Gold was used to make scabbard mountings and bracteates.

After the Western Roman Empire fell, gold became scarce and Scandinavians began to make objects of gilded bronze, with decorative figures of interlacing animals. During the EGIA, decorations tended to be representational; the animal figures were drawn in more basic forms. In the LGIA, artistic styles became more abstract, symbolic, and intricate, including figures with interlaced shapes and limbs.

The LGIA in the 8th century blends into the Viking Age and the proto-historical period, with legendary or semi-legendary oral tradition recorded a few centuries later in the Gesta Danorum, heroic legend and sagas, and an incipient tradition of primary written documents in the form of runestones.

Important royal or elite centres from this period include Gamla Uppsala and Uppåkra in Sweden, Lejre and Tissø in Denmark, and Avaldsnes and Borg (Lofotr) in Norway.

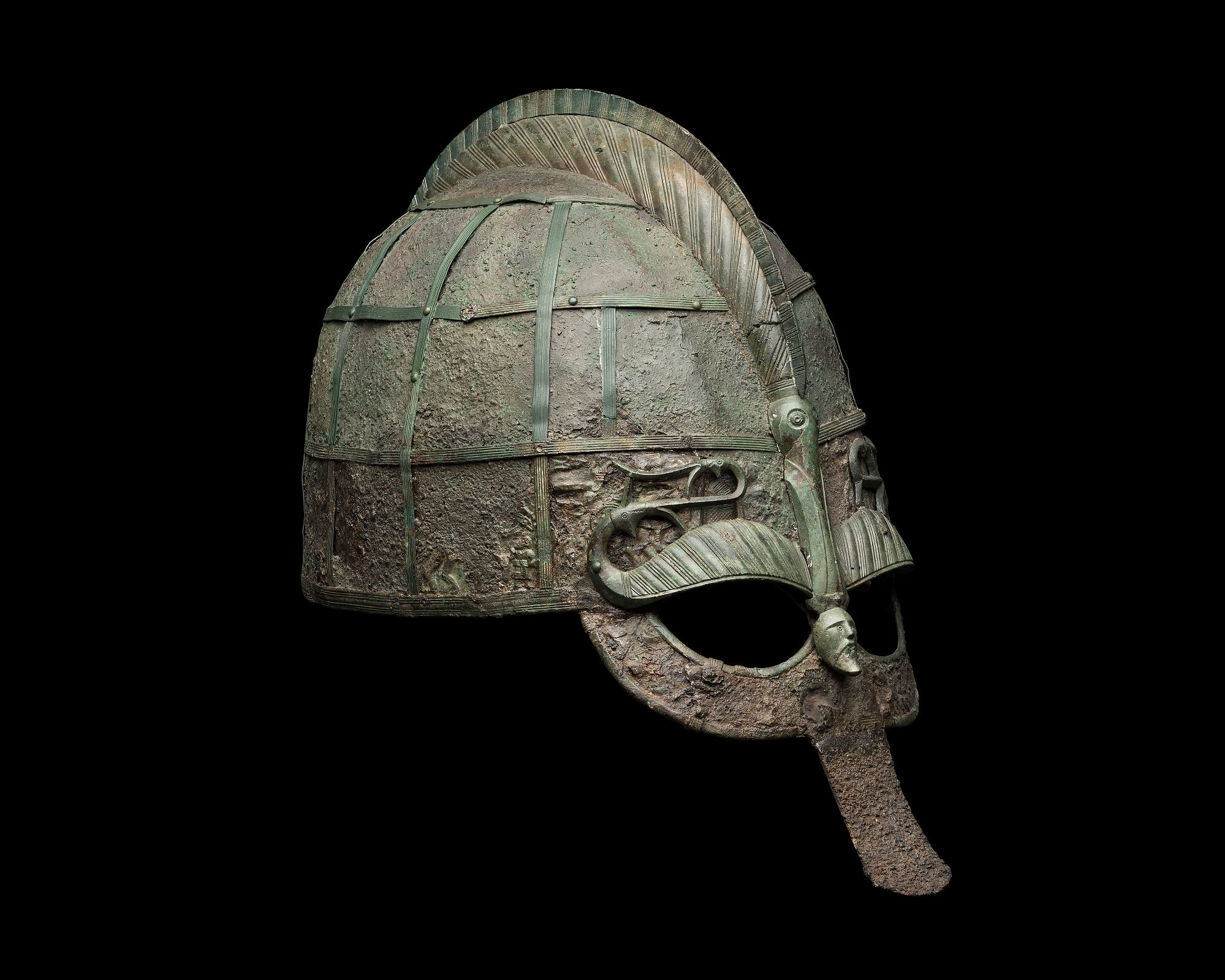
Vendel Period helmet, Sweden, c. 600 AD

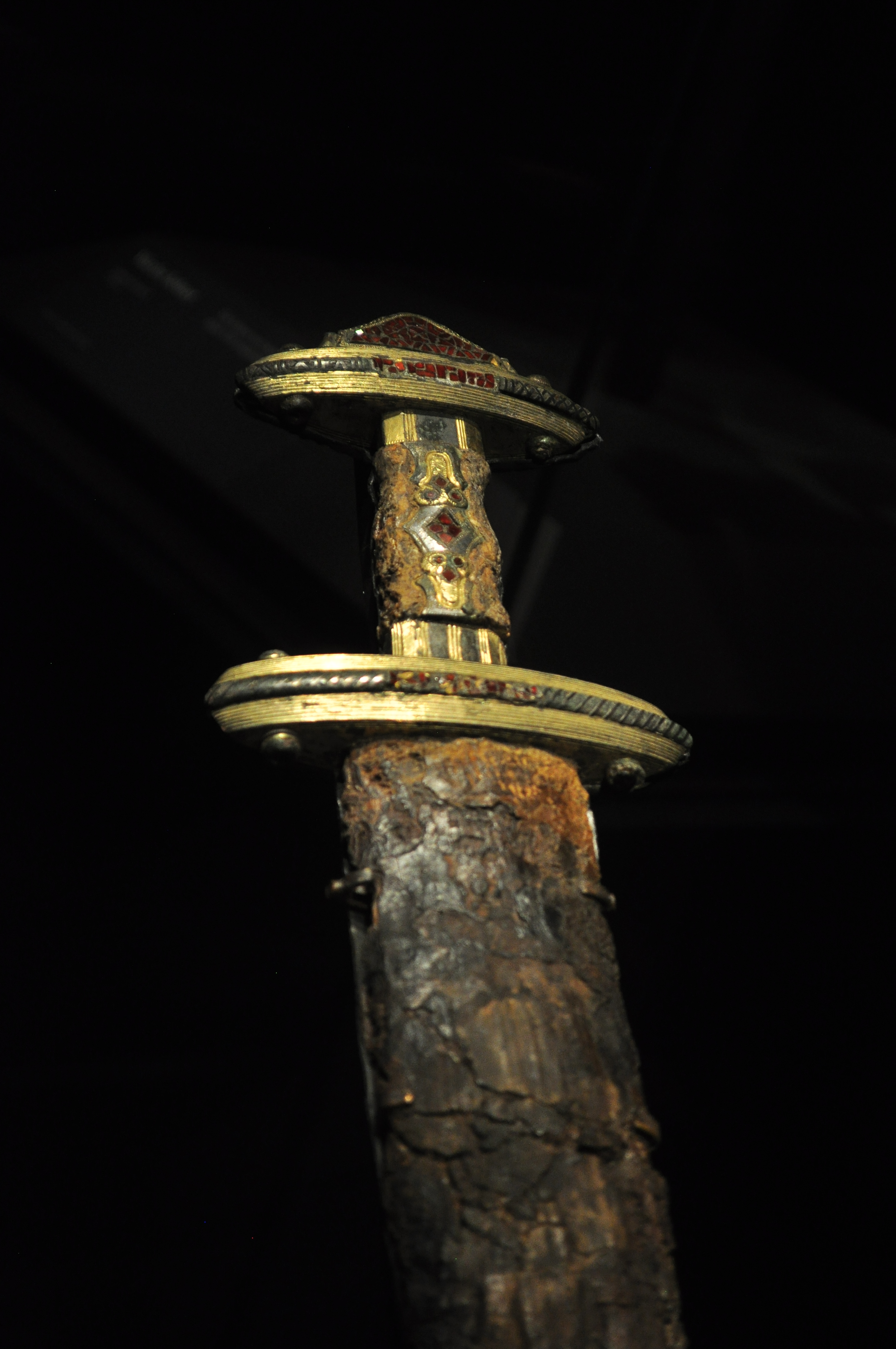
Vendel Period sword, Sweden, 7th century AD

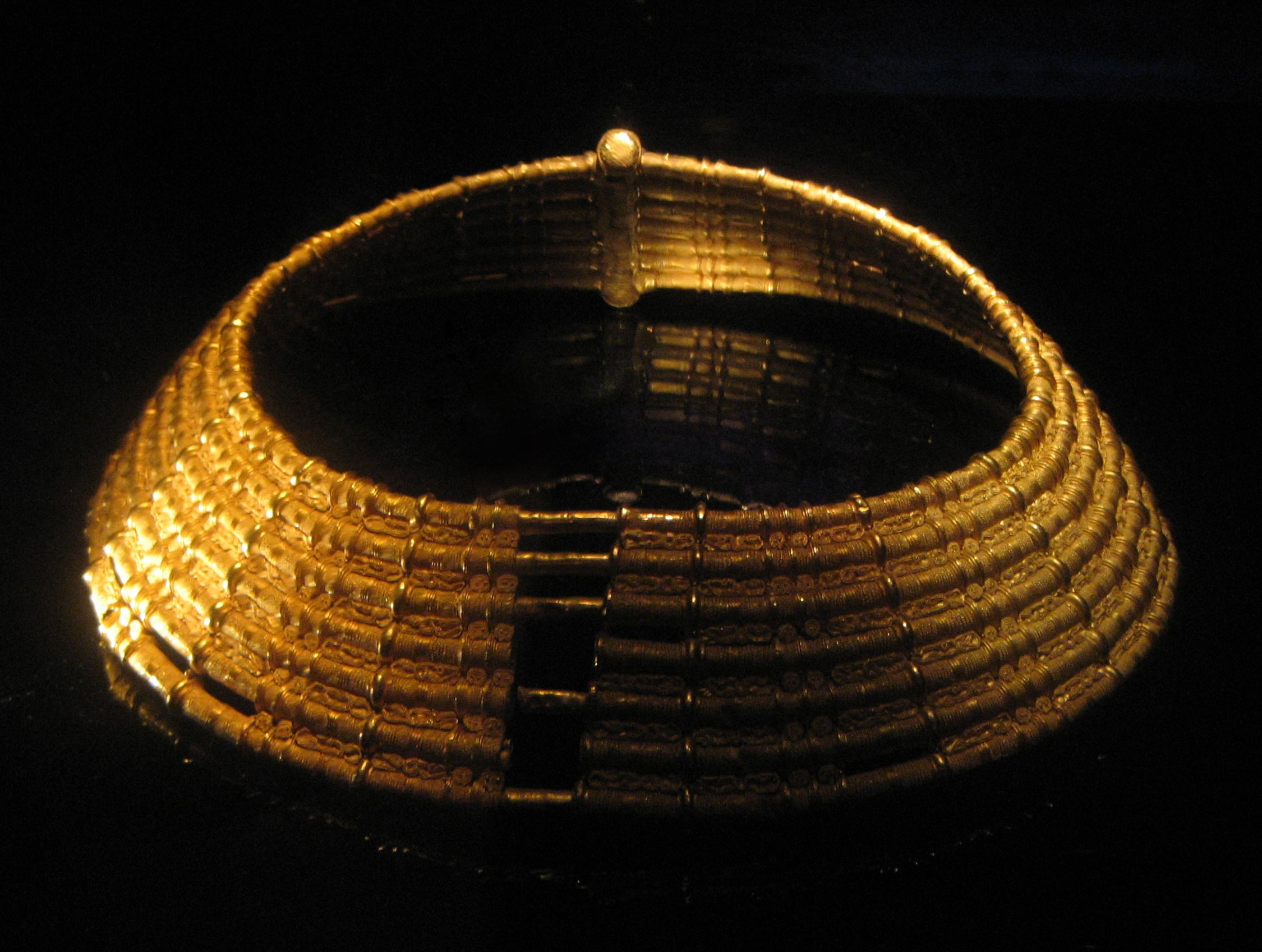
Möne Collar from Västergötland, Sweden, 400-500 AD

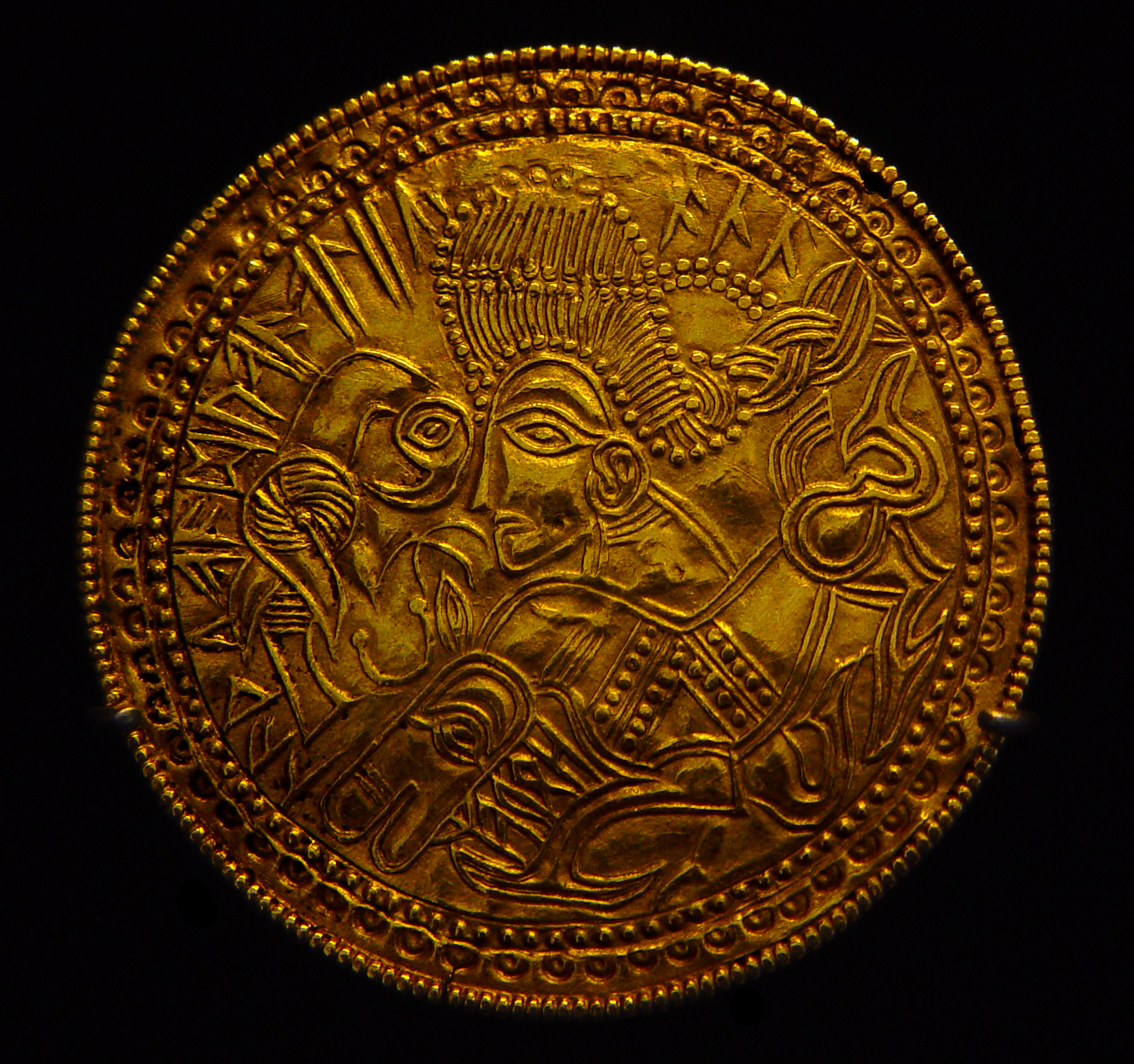
Gold bracteate from Funen, Denmark, with runic inscription to Odin

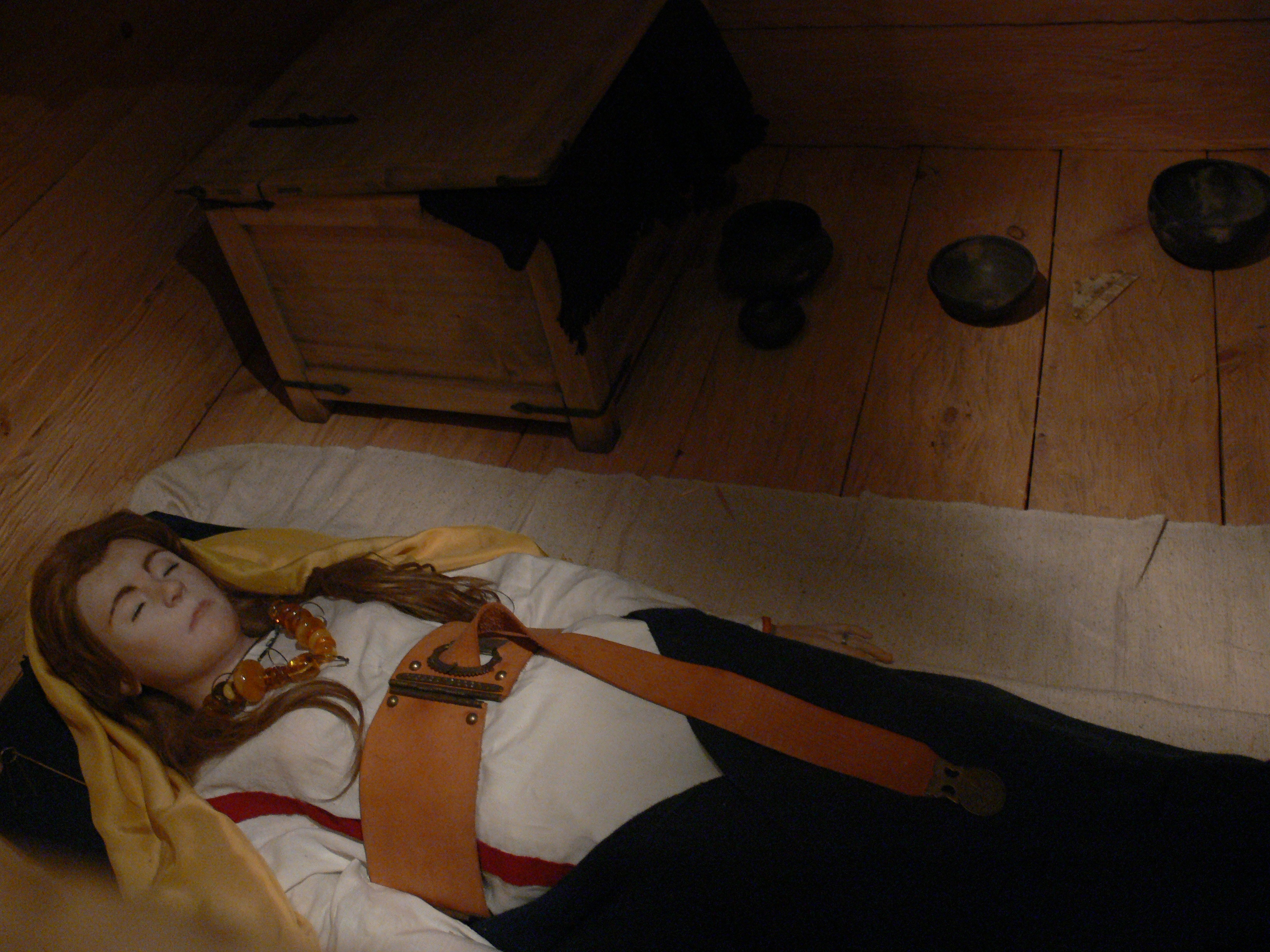
Burial reconstruction, Germany, 420 AD

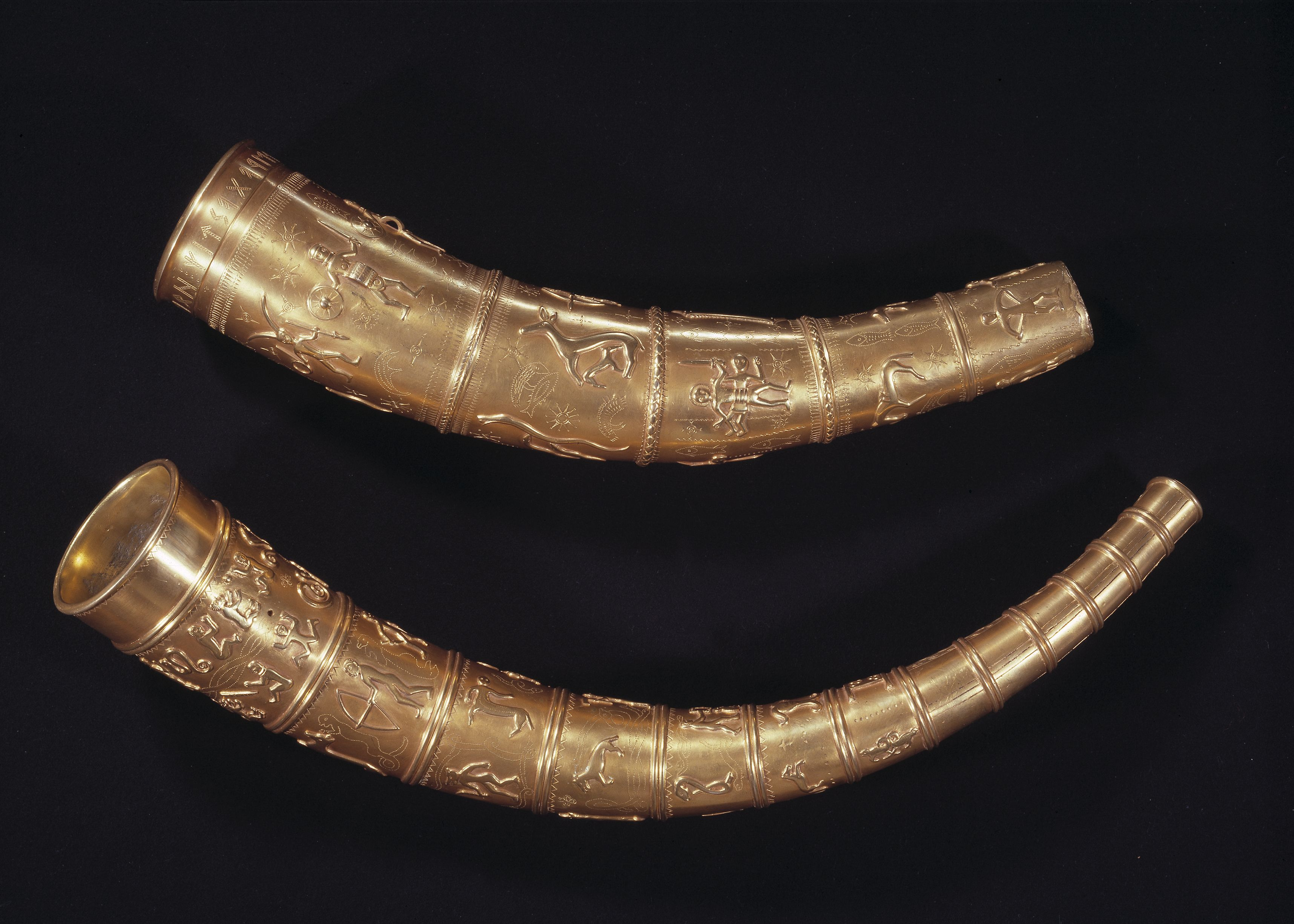
Golden Horns of Gallehus, Denmark, 5th century AD

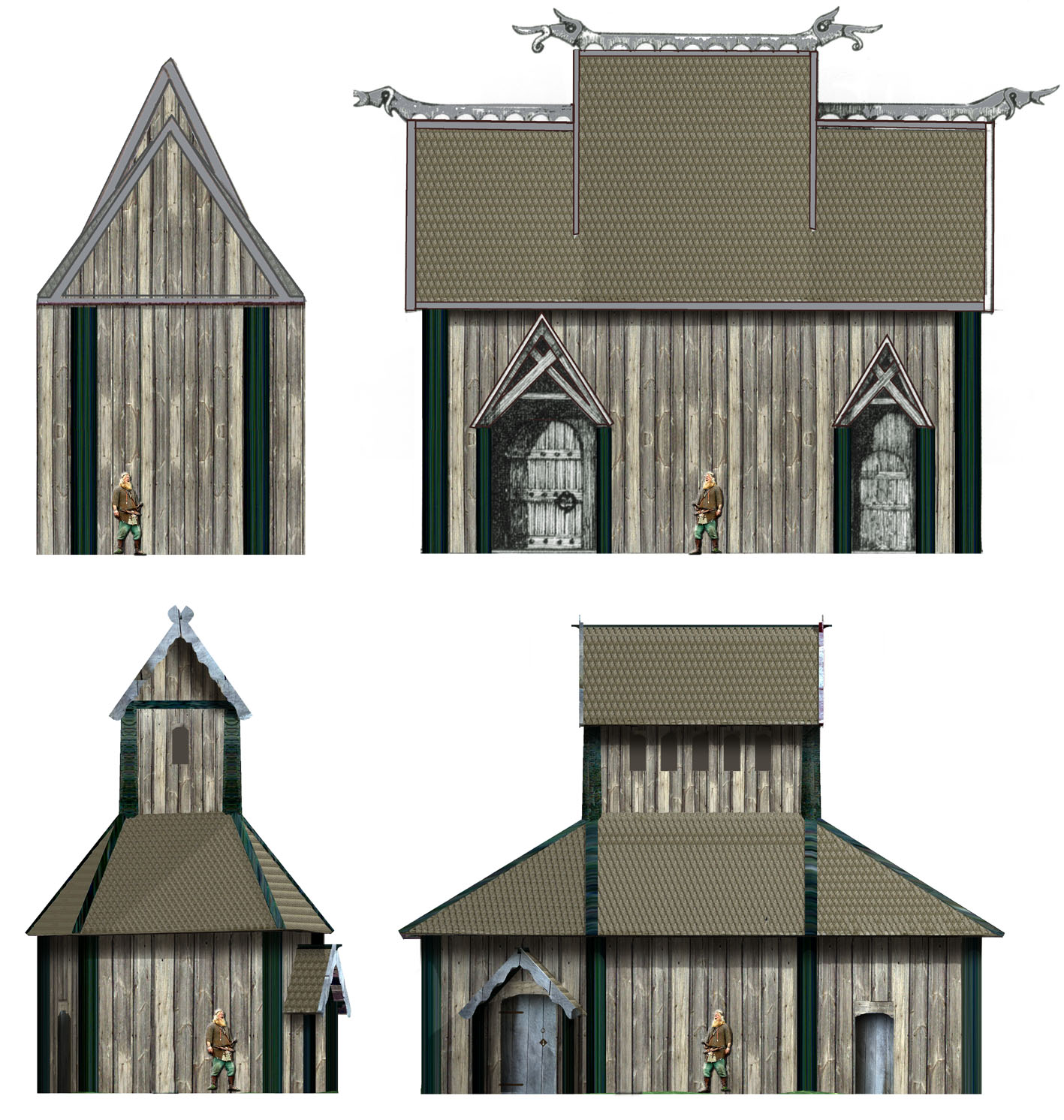
Uppåkra temple in Sweden, c. 6th-9th centuries

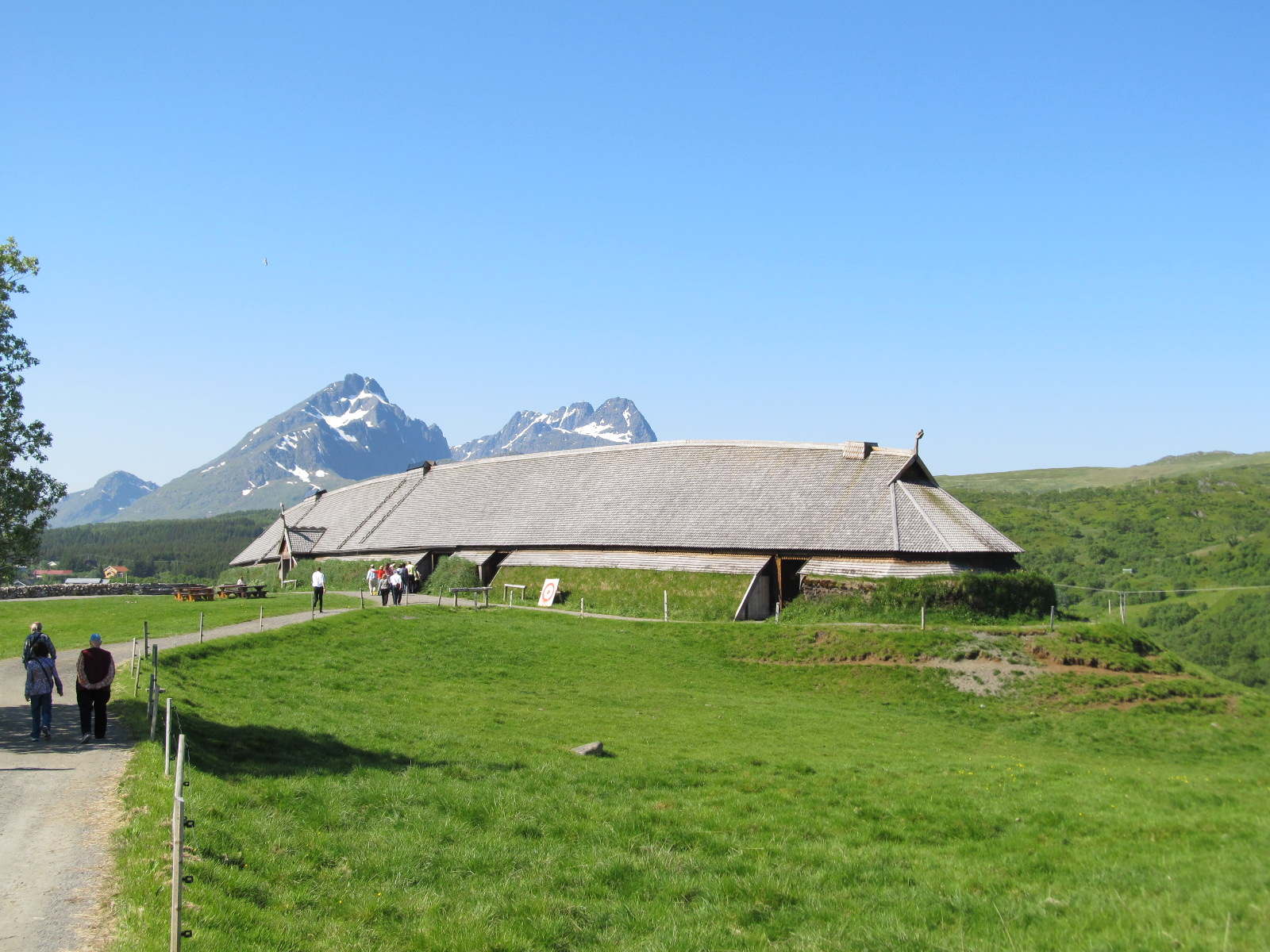
Chiefly hall at Borg (Lofotr), Norway, 8th century

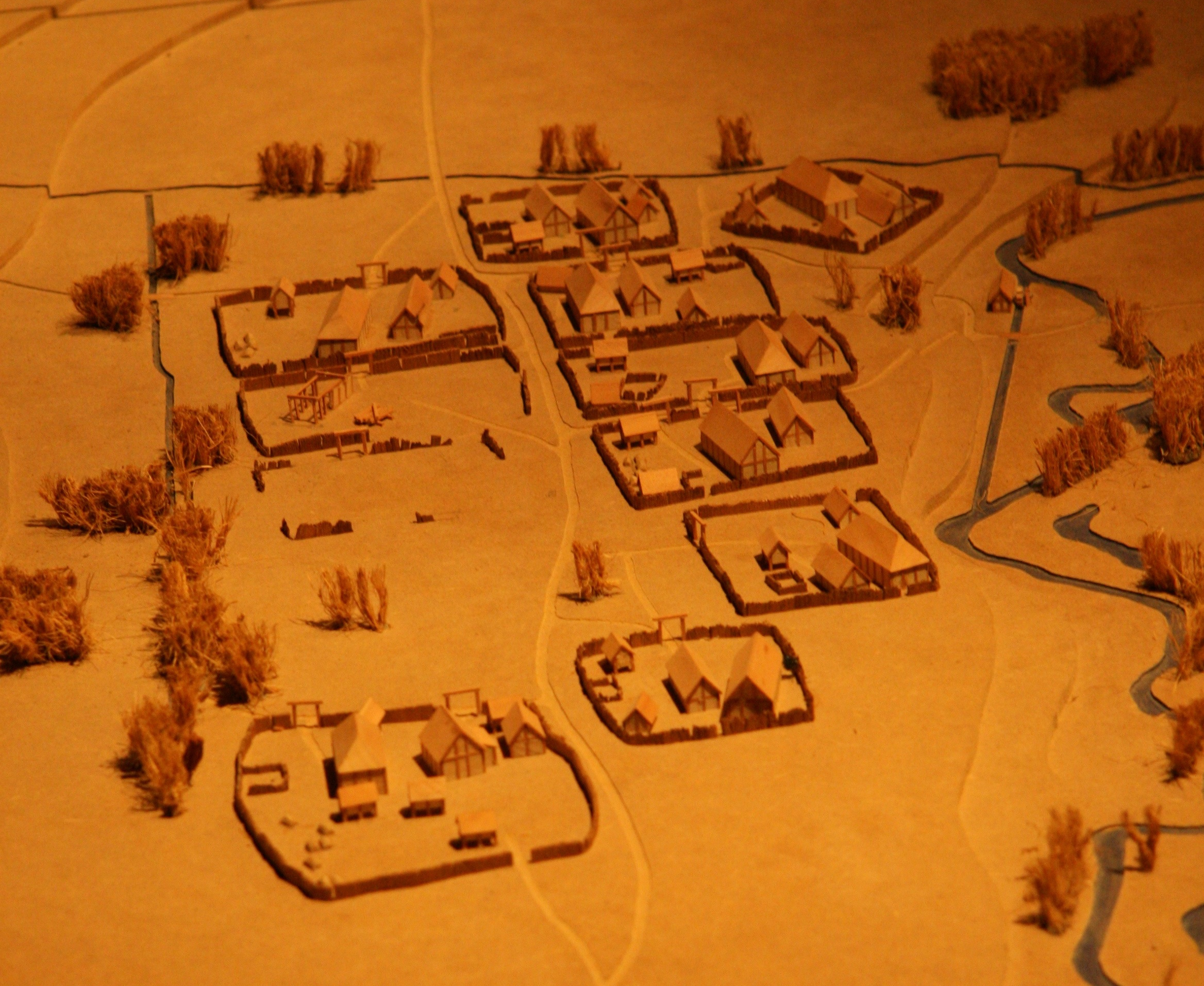
Model of an Alemannic village at Ellwangen, Germany, 7th century

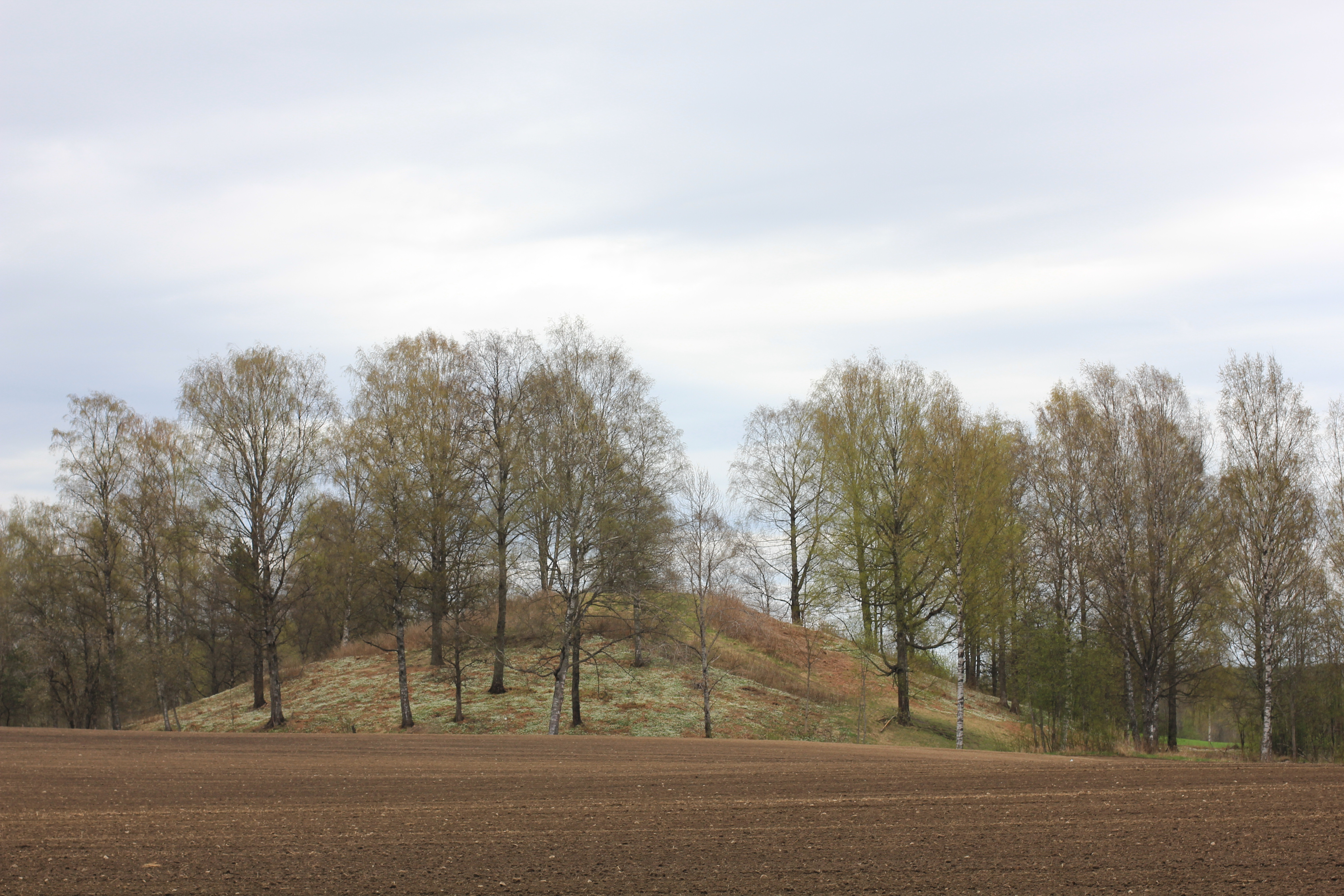
Burial mound, Norway, mid-6th century

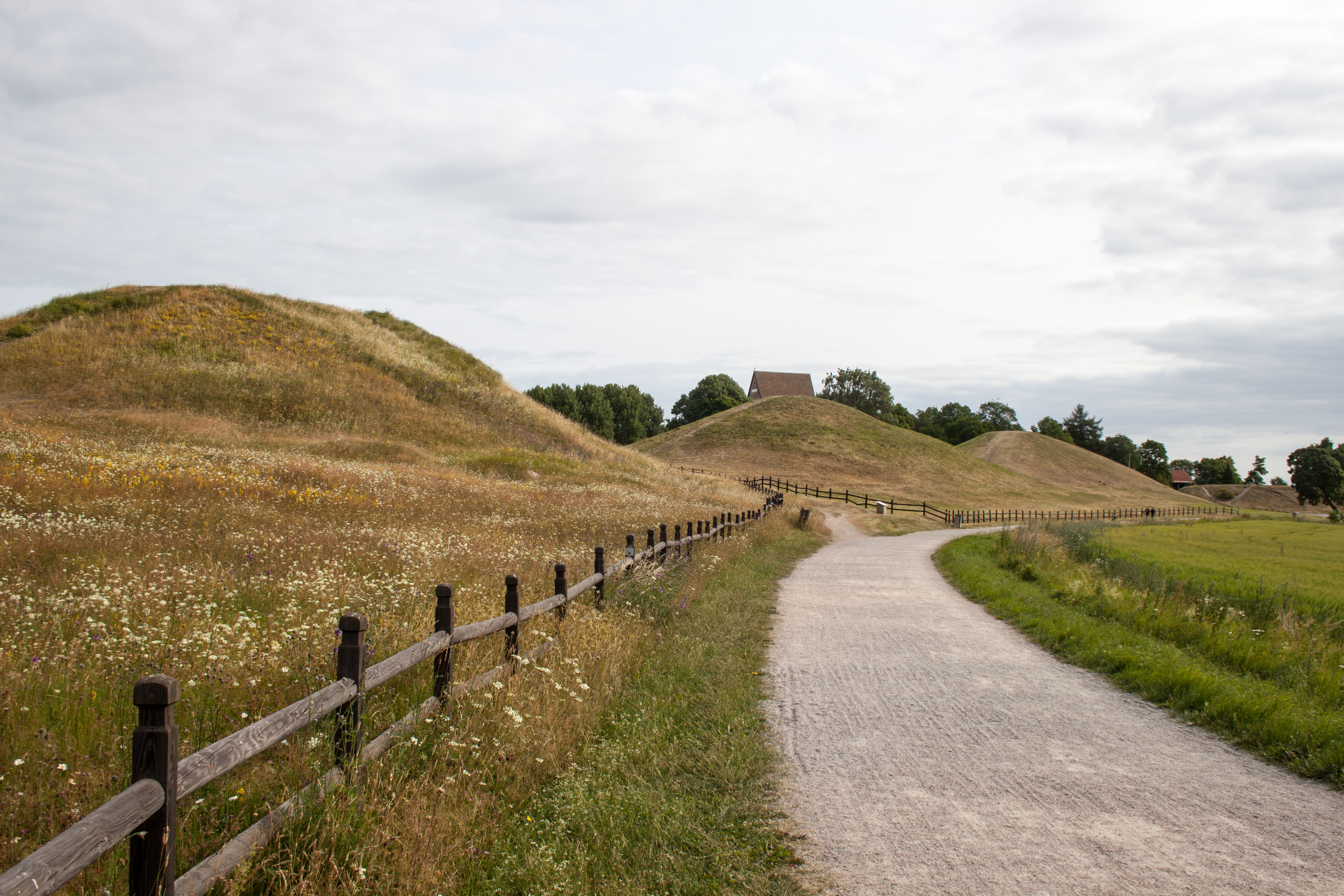
Royal burial mounds at Gamla Uppsala, Sweden, 5th-6th century

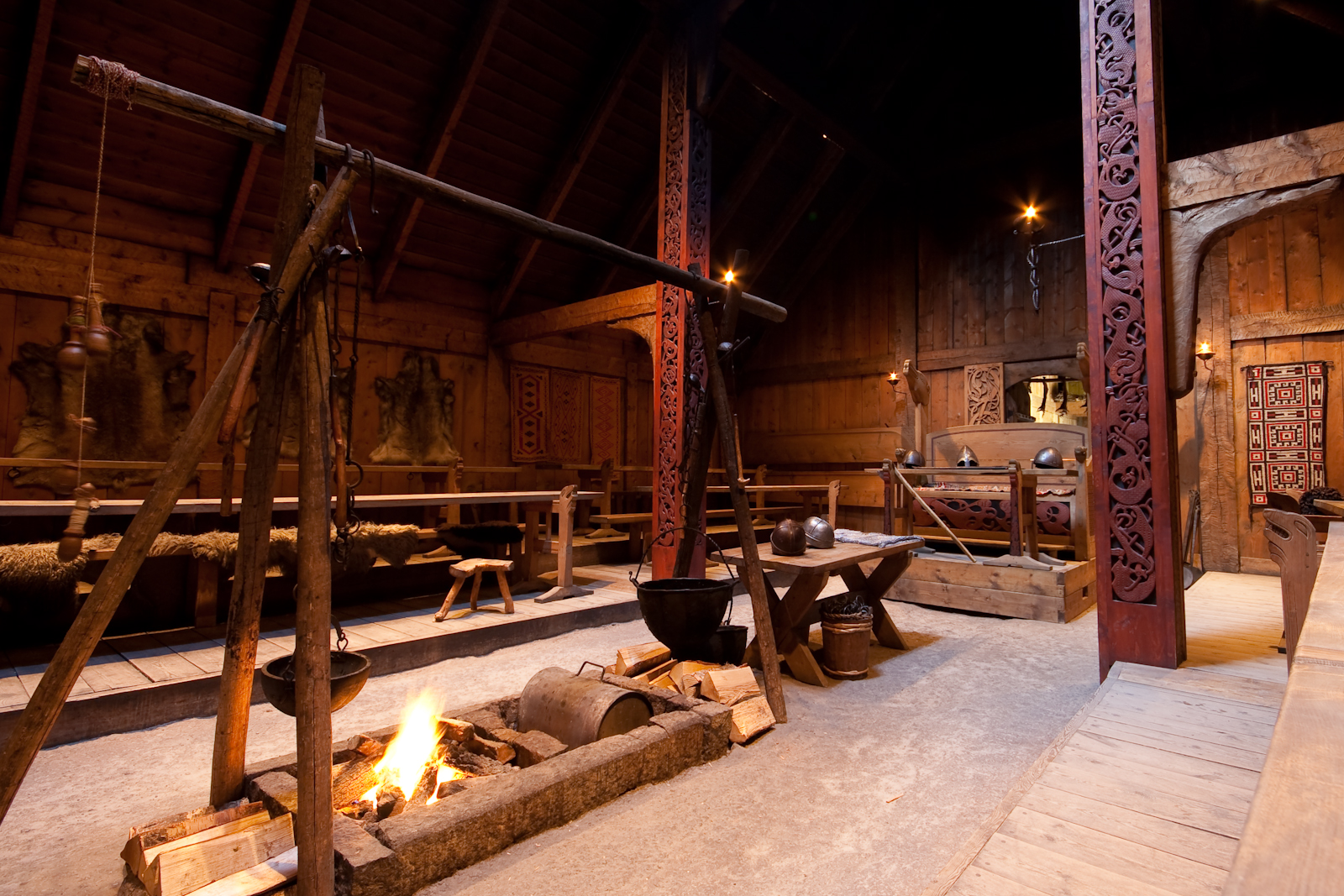
Reconstructed interior of the Hall at Lofotr, Norway, 8th century

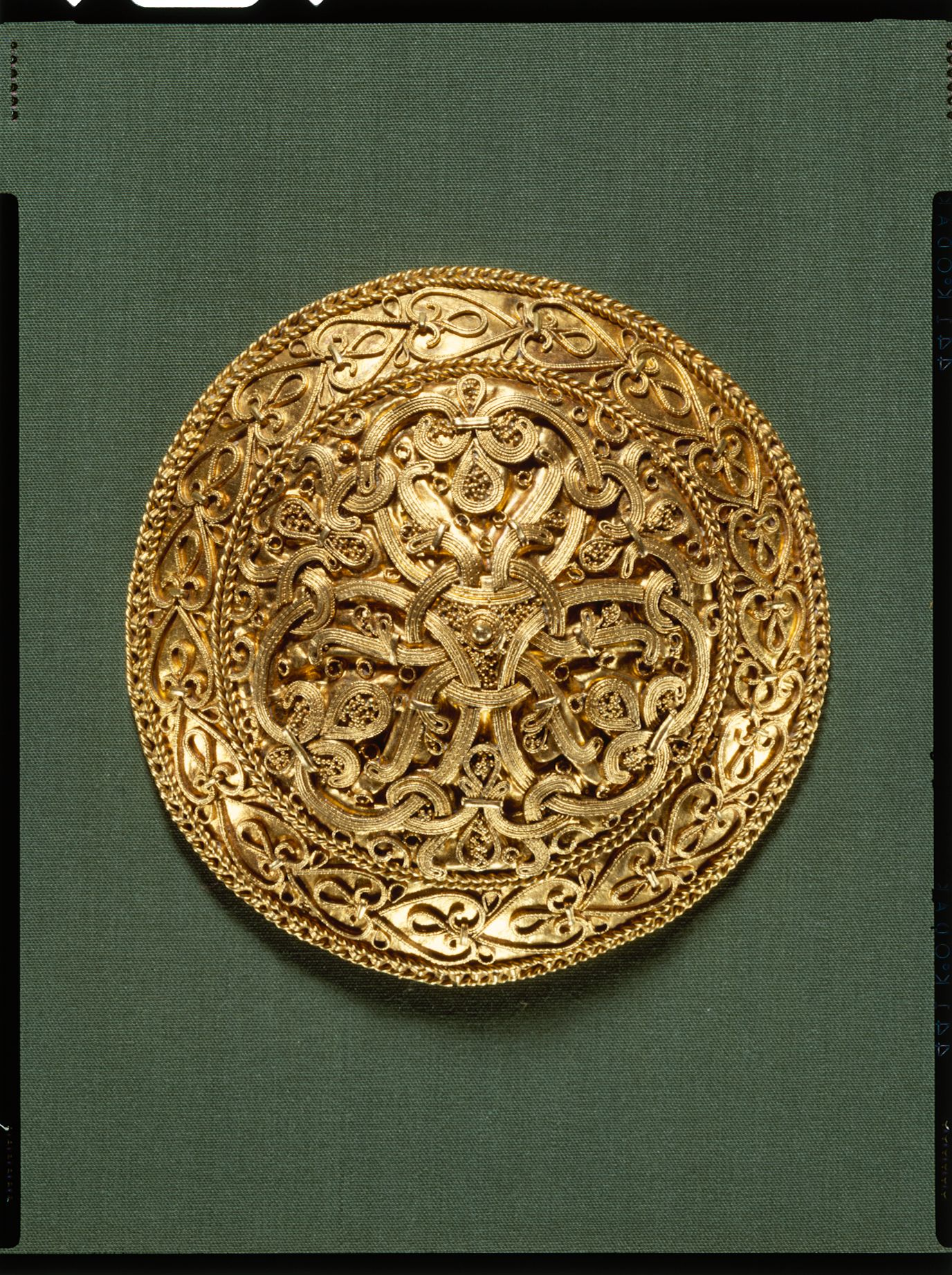
Gold brooch, Denmark

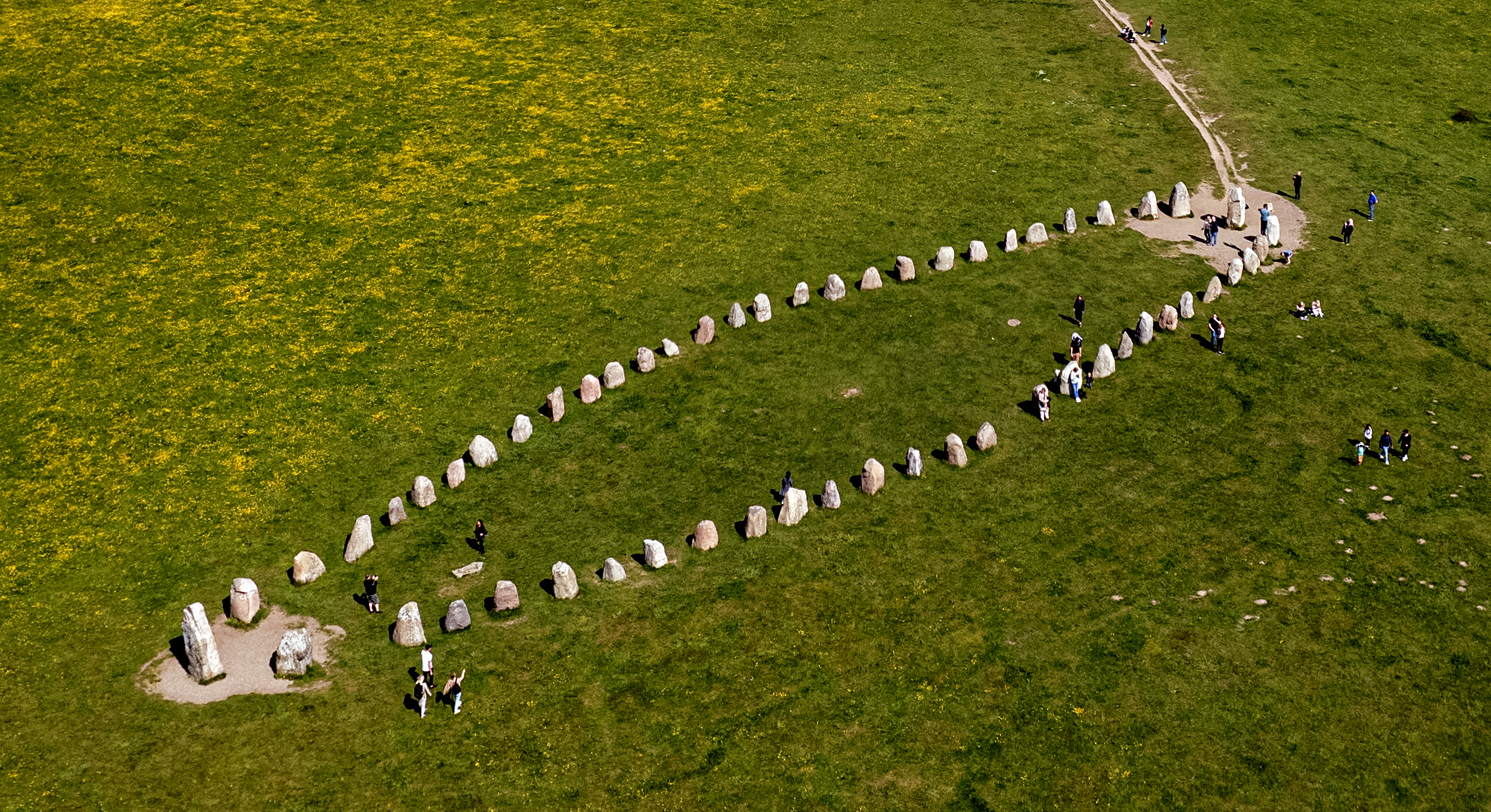
Ale's Stones, 'stone ship' setting, Sweden, c. 600 AD

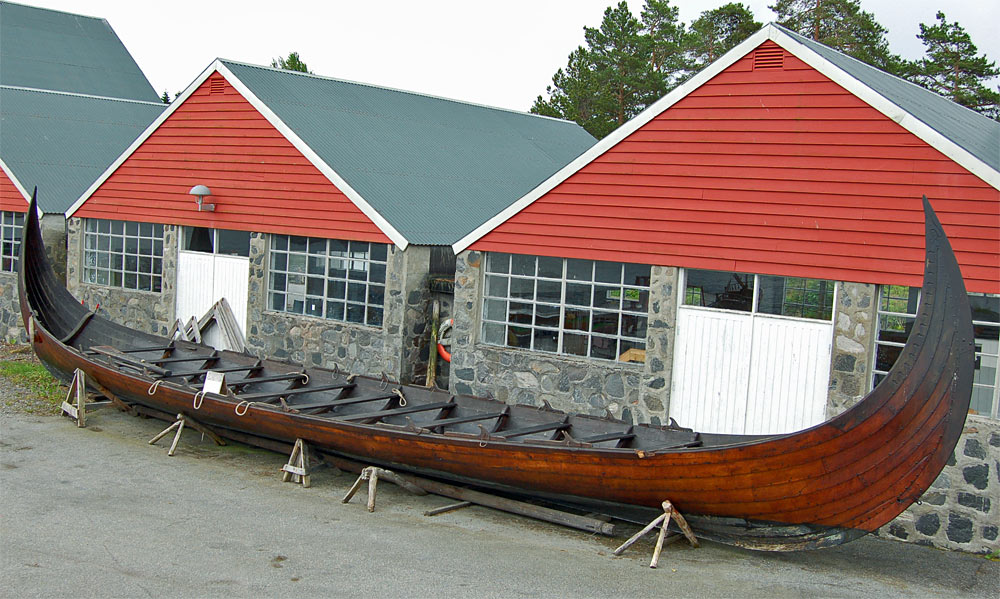
Reconstruction of the Kvalsund ship, Norway, 780-800 AD

Reconstruction of Gamla Uppsala in 650 AD

== See also ==
- Archaeology of Denmark
- Archaeology of Scandinavia
- List of archaeological periods
- Scandinavian prehistory
- Prehistoric Europe
- Ringwall (German wiki)
- Zakrzów Treasure (Polish wiki)
- Illerup Ådal
- Vimose inscriptions
