= Zarubintsy culture =

Iron Age culture in Eastern Europe

- Geographical range: Ukraine
- Period: Iron Age
- Dates: 3rd century BC – 1st century
- Preceded by: Milograd culture Pomeranian culture Scythian forest-steppe cultures
- Followed by: Kiev culture Chernyakhov culture Wielbark culture

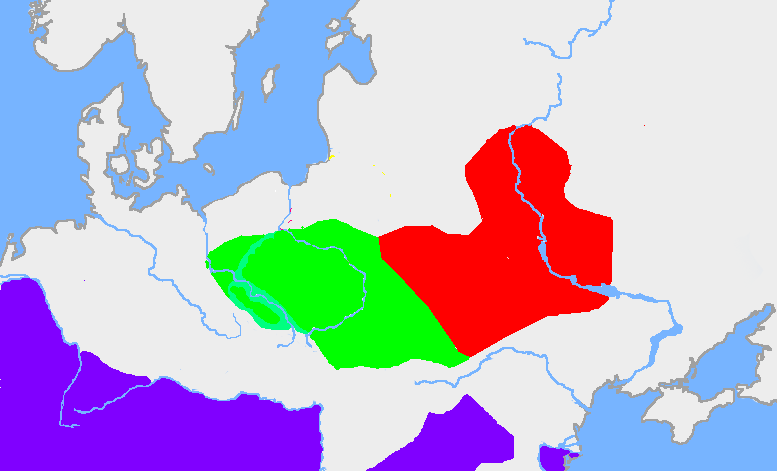
Zarubintsy culture (red) and Przeworsk culture (green)

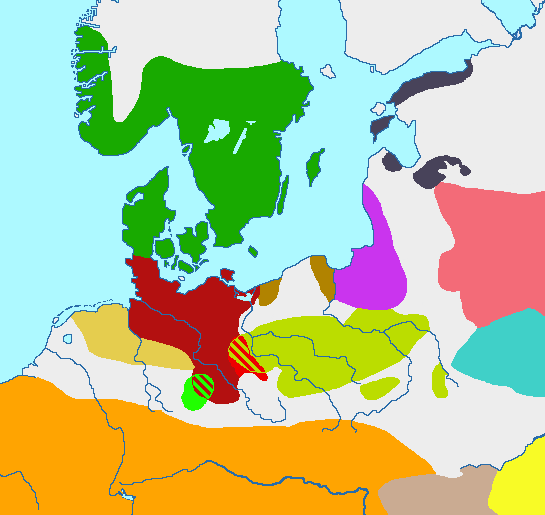
Archaeological cultures of Northern and Central Europe in the late Pre-Roman Iron Age: Jastorf culture Nordic (Germanic) culture Harpstedt-Nienburger group Celtic culture Przeworsk culture House Urns culture Eastern Balt (Forest Zone) culture Western Balt culture Zarubintsy culture Estonian group Gubin culture Oksywie culture Thracian group Poienești-Lukaševka culture

The Zarubintsy, Zarubyntsi or Zarubinets culture was a culture that, from the 3rd century BC until the 1st century AD, flourished in the area north of the Black Sea along the upper and middle Dnieper and Pripyat Rivers, stretching west towards the Southern Bug river. Zarubintsy sites were particularly dense between the Rivers Desna and Ros as well as along the Pripyat river. It was identified around 1899 by the Czech-Ukrainian archaeologist Vikentiy Khvoyka and is now attested by about 500 sites. The culture was named after finds of cremated remains in the village of Zarubyntsi on the Dnieper.

The Zarubintsy culture is possibly connected to the early Slavs (proto-Slavs), with possible links to the peoples of the Dnieper basin. The culture was influenced by the La Tène culture and the nomads of the steppes (the Scythians and the Sarmatians). The Scythian and Sarmatian influence is evident especially in pottery, weaponry, and domestic and personal objects.

The bearers of the culture engaged in agriculture, documented by numerous finds of sickles. Pobol suggested that the culture experienced a transition from swidden ('slash-and-burn') to plough-type cultivation. In addition, they raised animals. Remains included sheep, goat, cattle, horses, and swine. There is evidence they also traded wild animal skins with Black Sea towns.

Some sites were defended by ditches and banks, structures thought to have been built to defend against nomadic tribes from the steppe. Dwellings were either of surface or semi-subterranean types, with posts supporting the walls, a hearth in the middle, and large conic pits located nearby.

== Burials ==
Inhabitants practiced cremation. Cremated remains were either placed in large, hand-made ceramic urns, or were placed in a large pit and surrounded by food and ornaments, such as spiral bracelets and Middle to Late La-Tene type fibulae.

== Decline ==
The disintegration of the Zarubintsy culture has been linked with the emigration of its population in several directions. Density of settlements in the central region decreases, as late Zarubintsy groups appear radially, especially southward into the forest-steppe regions of the middle Dnieper, Desna, and southern Donets rivers. Influences upon local cultures in the east Carpathian/ Podolia region, as well as, to a lesser extent, north into the forest zone are also evident. The movement of Zarubintsy groups has been linked to an increasingly arid climate, whereby the population left the hillforts on high promontories and moved southward into river valleys. This mostly southern movement brought them closer to westward moving Sarmatian groups (from the Don region) and Thracian-Celtic elements. By the 3rd century AD, central late Zarubintsy sites 're-arranged' into the so-called Kyiv culture, whilst the westernmost areas were integrated into the Wielbark culture.

== Sources and external links ==
- J. P. Mallory, "Zarubintsy Culture", Encyclopedia of Indo-European Culture, Fitzroy Dearborn, 1997.
- The Early Germans
- The Slavs in Antiquity
- The Early Slavs. Eastern Europe from the Initial Settlement to the Kievan Rus. Pavel M Dolukhanov. Longman. 1996. Pages 148-151.
- Andrew Villen Bell, Andrew Bell-Fialkoff. The role of migration in the history of the Eurasian steppe: sedentary civilization vs. "barbarian" and nomad . Palgrave Macmillan, 2000. ISBN 0-312-21207-0

== See also ==
- Chernyakhov culture
