= Ancient Belgian language =

Hypothetical extinct European language

Ancient Belgian
- Belgic
- (controversial)
- Native to: Low Countries
- Region: Nordwestblock, Belgica
- Ethnicity: Belgae, Germanic Substrate?
- Extinct: Antiquity
- Language family: Indo-European (?): Celtic/Italic (?); Ancient Belgian

Language codes
- ISO 639-3: None (mis)
- Glottolog: None

Ancient Belgian is a hypothetical extinct Indo-European or Pre-Indo-European language, spoken in Belgica (northern Gaul) in late prehistory with no known written records. It is mostly explained by Celtic onomastics, but having some features distinct from neighbouring languages, including Germanic. It is sometimes identified with the hypothetical Nordwestblock. According to the theory, which was further elaborated by Hans Kuhn and others, traces of Belgian can be found in certain toponyms such as South-East-Flemish Bevere, Eine, Mater and Melden.

== Overview ==
The borders of the Belgian Sprachraum are made up of the Canche and the Authie in the south-west, the Weser and the Aller in the east, and the Ardennes and the German Mittelgebirge in the south-east. Some scholars associate it with the Nordwestblock, more specifically with the Hilversum culture.

The use of the name Belgian for the language is to some extent supported by Julius Caesar's De Bello Gallico. Some terms can be traced directly to Celtic, such as Indutiomaros (Gaulish maros 'great', 'powerful'), Eburovices (similar to Eburacum, York) or Boduognatos (compare the Irish mythological figure Bodb Derg)

Caesar mentions that the Belgae and the Galli spoke different languages, which is partially supported by toponyms in present-day Belgium, which, according to Kuhn, point at the existence of an Indo-European language, distinct from Celtic and Germanic languages. Hans Kuhn also noted certain connections (suffixes, ethnonyms, toponyms, anthroponyms) between this language and the Indo-European languages of southern Europe, in particular with the Italic languages. Before their migration to the south, the Italics might have resided in central Europe, in the vicinity of the Germans, Celts and the Slavs, as shown by the amount of vocabulary common to these groups. Some of them may have migrated to the northwest, while the others headed for the Italian peninsula.

Proponents of the Belgian language hypothesis also suggest that it was influenced by Germanic languages during a first, early Germanicisation in the 3rd century BC, distinct from the Frankish colonization in the 5th to the 8th centuries AD. For example, the Germanic sound shifts (p → f, t → th, k → h, ŏ → ă) have affected toponyms that supposedly have a Belgian-language origin.

Characteristics of Belgian are said to include the retention of p after the sound shifts, a trait that it shared with the Lusitanian language. Names of bodies of water ending in -ara, as in the name for the Dender; -ănā or -ŏnā, as in Matrŏnā (Marne River and also the current Mater) and settlement names ending in -iŏm are supposedly typically Belgian as well.

According to Gysseling, traces of Belgian are still visible. The diminutive suffix -ika, the feminizing suffixes -agjōn and -astrjō and the collective suffix -itja have been incorporated in Dutch, sometimes very productively. In toponymy, apa, poel, broek, gaver, drecht, laar and ham are retained as Belgian loanwords.

== Classification ==
The language is mostly seen as Celtic, due to Celtic tribe names of later Belgae or Para-Celtic features similar to Lusitanian, and sometimes as Germanic. Linguists proposed that Belgian was distinct from the Celtic and Germanic languages; some see it as a non-Indo-European language related to Tyrsenian, while others suggest a distinct Indo-European branch, similar to the case with Lusitanian. Similarly, an alternative view suggests that Belgian was the result of an interaction between different substrates and time periods, that started resembling a distinct language, despite not being one.

== See also ==
- Germanic substrate hypothesis
- Para-Celtic languages

== Sources ==
- M. Gysseling, "Enkele Belgische leenwoorden in de toponymie", in Naamkunde 7 (1975), pp. 1–6. (in Dutch)
- J. Molemans, "Profiel van de Kempische toponymie", in Naamkunde 9 (1977), pp. 1–50. (in Dutch)
