= Pomeranian culture =

Iron Age culture in northern Central Europe

- Geographical range: Central Europe, Eastern Europe
- Period: Iron Age
- Dates: 7th century BC – 3rd century BC
- Preceded by: Lusatian culture
- Followed by: Oksywie culture, Przeworsk culture

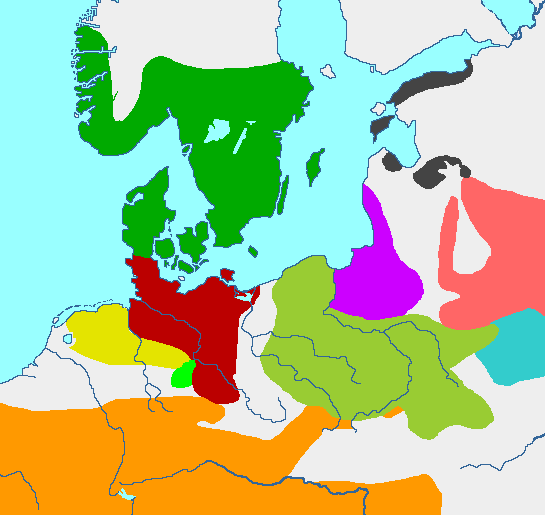
Early Iron Age: Nordic Bronze Age Jastorf culture Harpstedt-Nienburg group Celtic groups Pomeranian culture House urns culture East Baltic culture West Baltic cairns culture Milograd culture Estonian group

The Pomeranian culture, also Pomeranian or Pomerelian Face Urn culture was an Iron Age culture with origins in parts of the area south of the Baltic Sea (which later became Pomerania, part of northern Germany and Poland), from the 7th century BC to the 3rd century BC, which eventually covered most of today's Poland.

About 650 BC, it evolved from the Lusatian culture between the lower Vistula and Parseta rivers, and subsequently expanded southward. Between 200 and 150 BC, it was succeeded by the Oksywie culture in eastern Pomerania and the Przeworsk culture at the upper Vistula and Oder rivers.

== Features ==
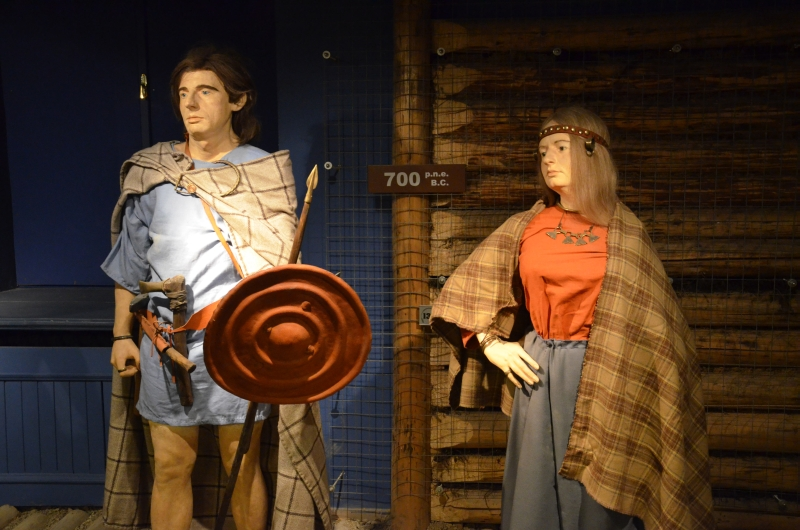
Pomeranian culture, reconstruction

The Pomeranian culture developed in Western Pomerania covering the entire range of the Oder (Odra) and Vistula river basins. It has been sometimes associated with the Bastarnae. The original homeland of the Bastarnae remains uncertain. Babeş and Shchukin argue in favour of an origin in eastern Pomerania on the Baltic coast of northwestern Poland, on the grounds of correspondences in archaeological material e.g. a Pomeranian-style fibula found in a Poieneşti site in Moldavia.

The most characteristic feature was the use of burial urns with faces. The urns were often contained in stone cists. The face-urns have lids in the form of hats, often miniature ear-rings of real bronze are added. The faces are sometimes modelled very naturalistically, and no two urns show the same face. Incised drawings on the urns show hunting scenes, chariot races, or riders. Brooches of Certoza-type and necklaces of multiple bronze rings are typical examples of metal work.

The economy was similar to that of the Lusatian culture. Rye was systematically cultivated for the first time, but still formed a minor component of the cereals. There were fewer hill forts than in the area of the Lusatian culture further west. Southern imports were sparse as well.

== Related cultures ==
A related culture of the same age was the House Urn culture in central Germany.

== Spread ==
In the later Iron Age, the Pomeranian culture spread southward, into areas formerly belonging to the Lusatian, Wysoko- and Milograd cultures.

Later, the Pomeranian culture developed into the group with bell-shaped burials – it is, however, disputed whether these represent two distinct archaeological cultures or the organic development of a single culture.

== Gallery ==
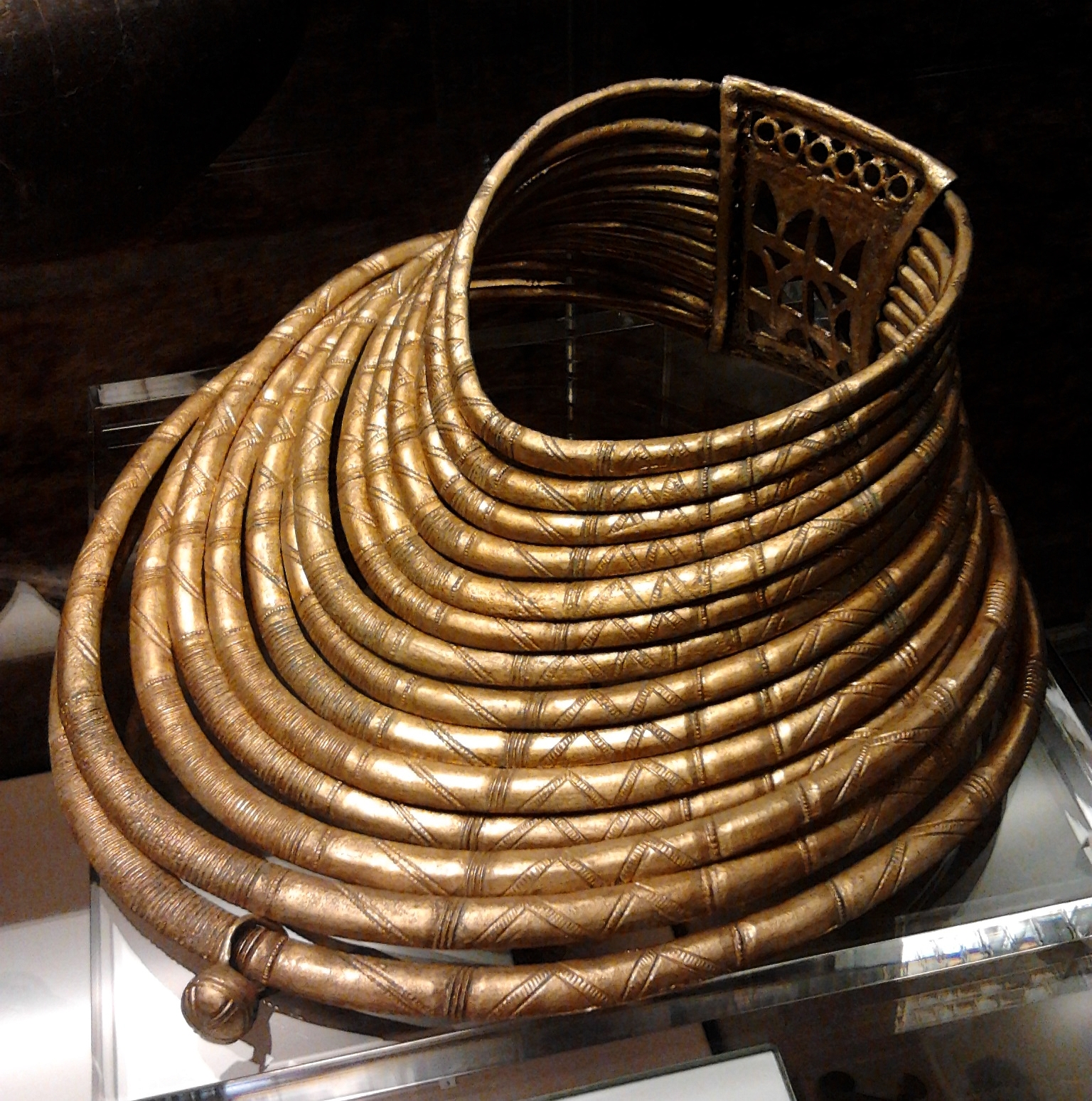
Pomeranian bronze pectoral, Poland

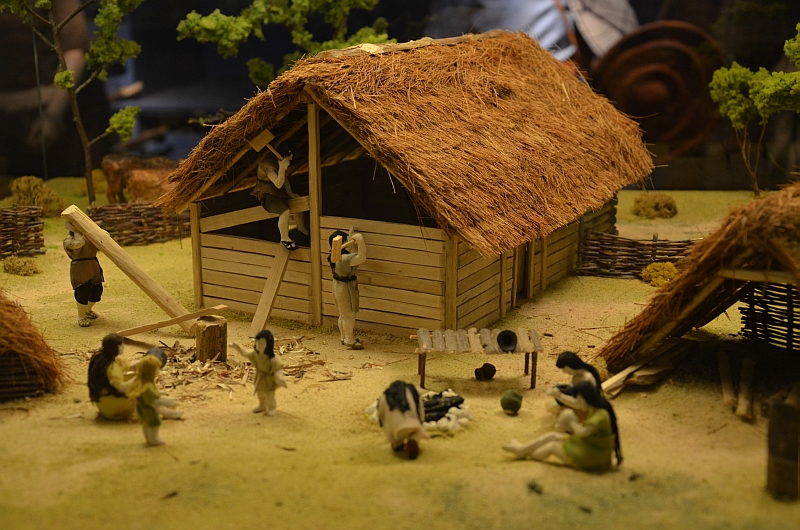
8th century BC house model

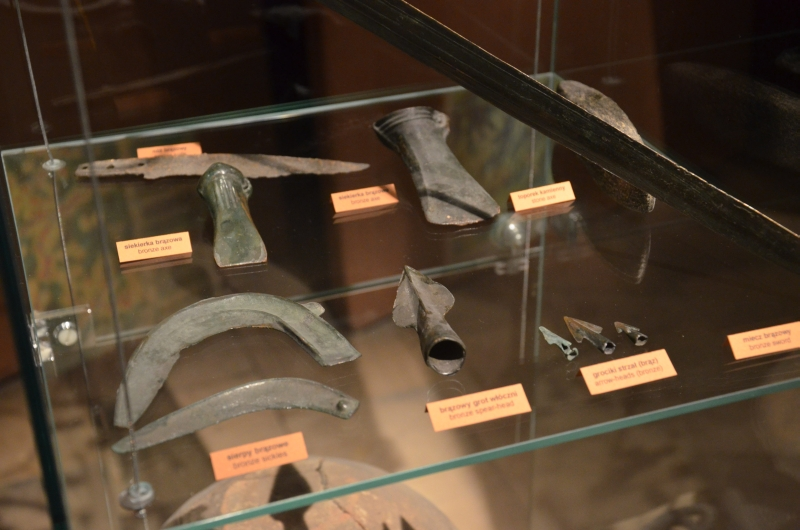
Tools and weapons

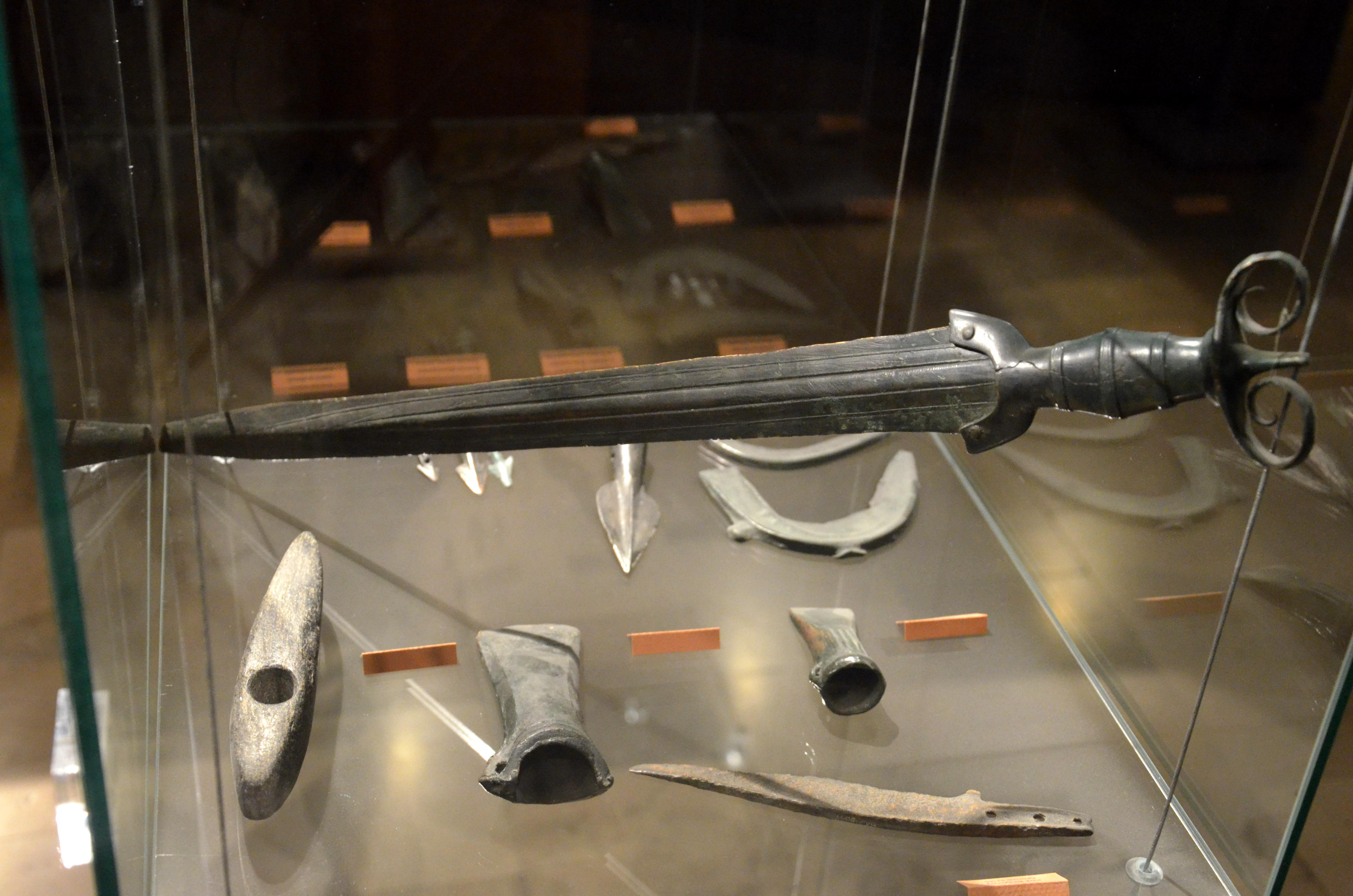
Antenna sword, Hallstatt period, 8th century BC

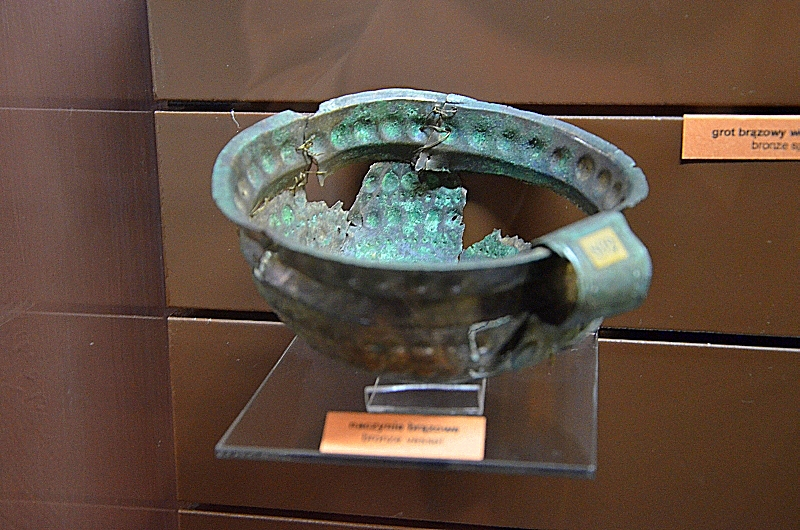
Bronze cup

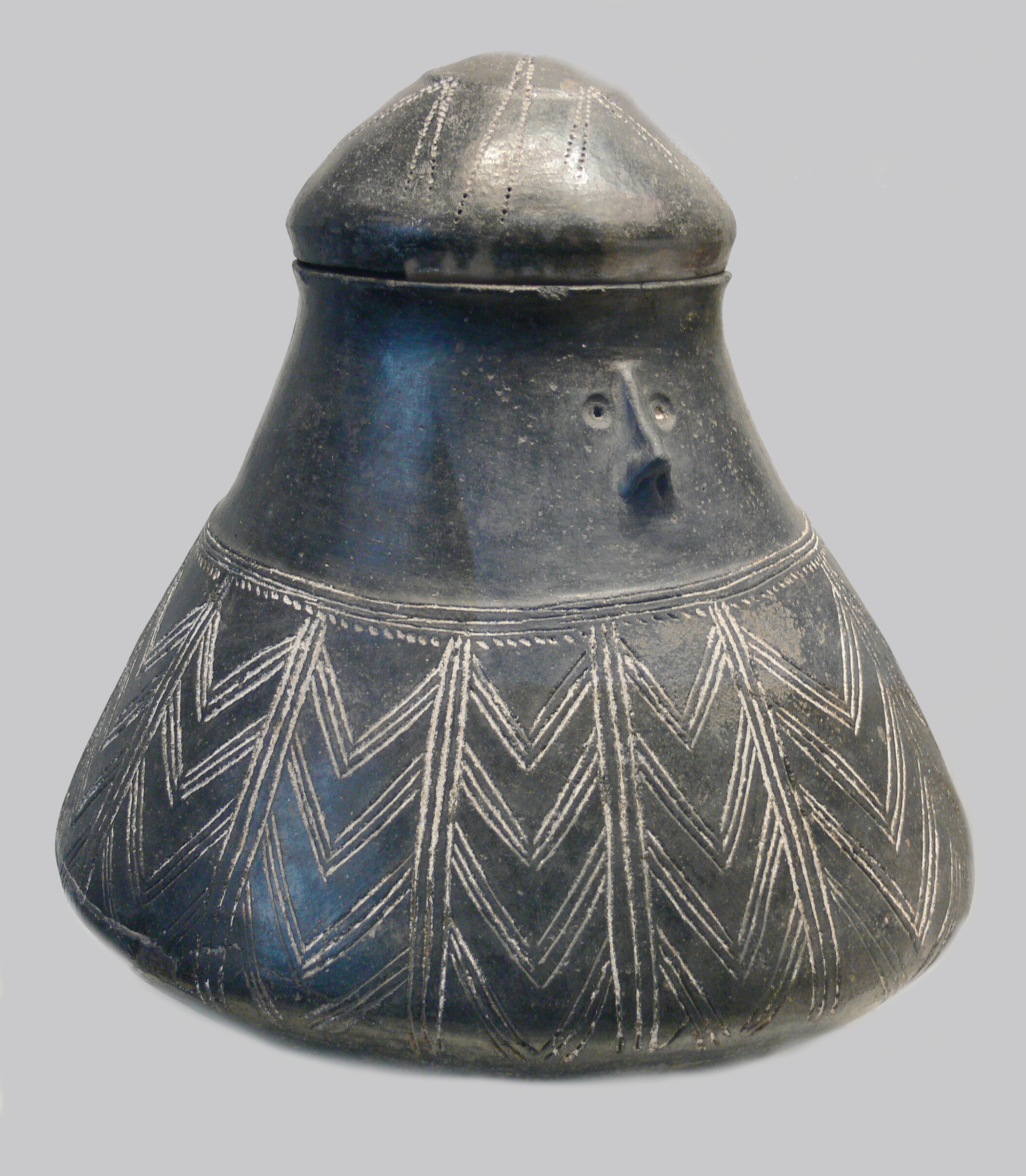
Urn with facial decoration

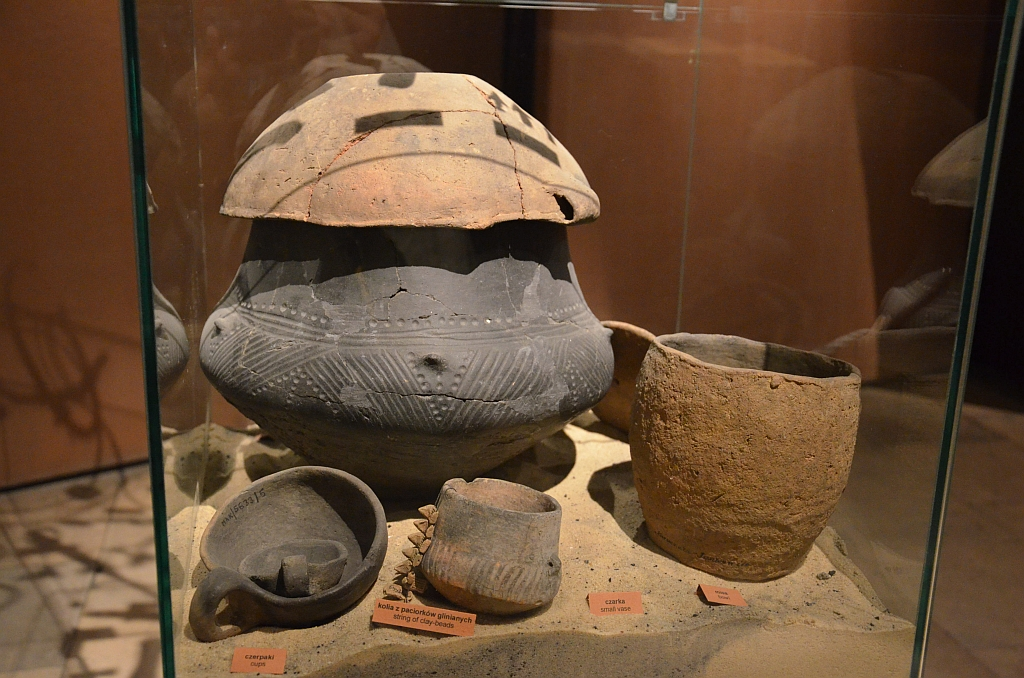
7th century cinerary urn burial

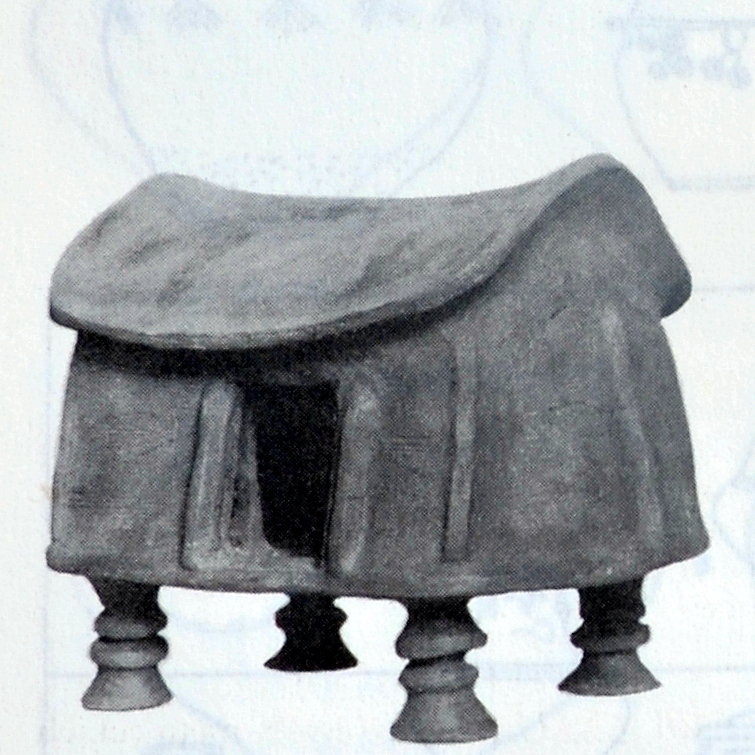

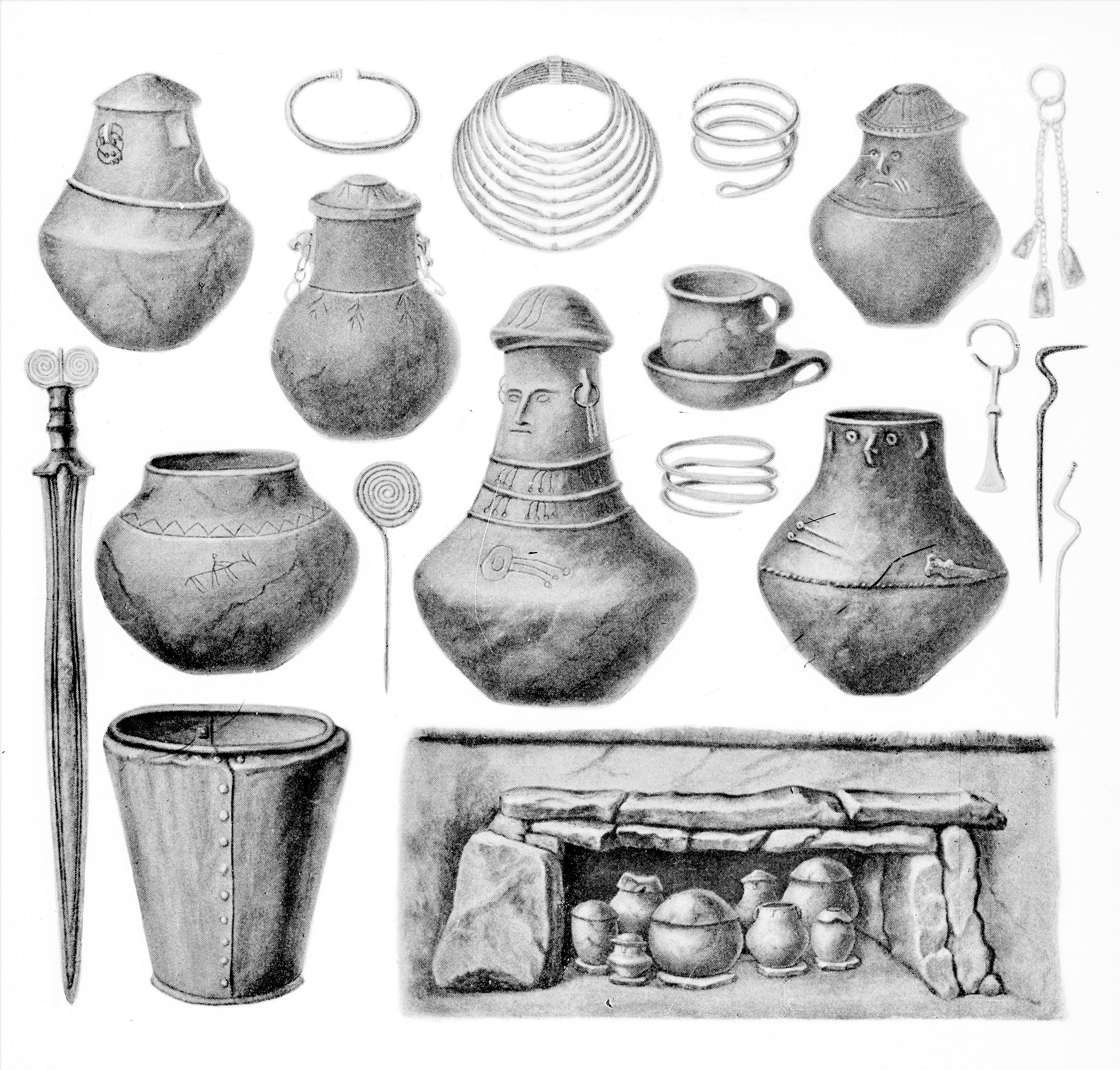

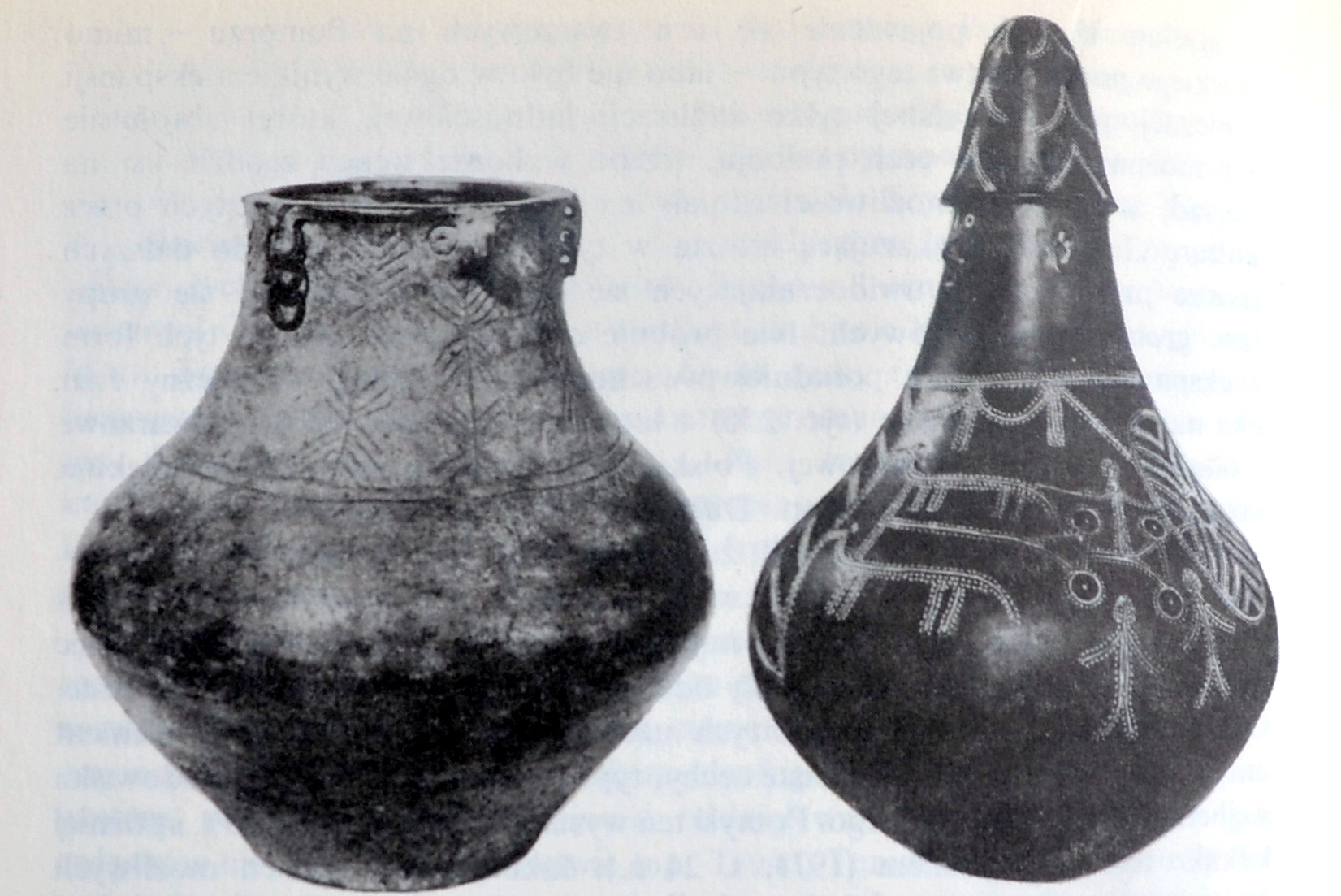

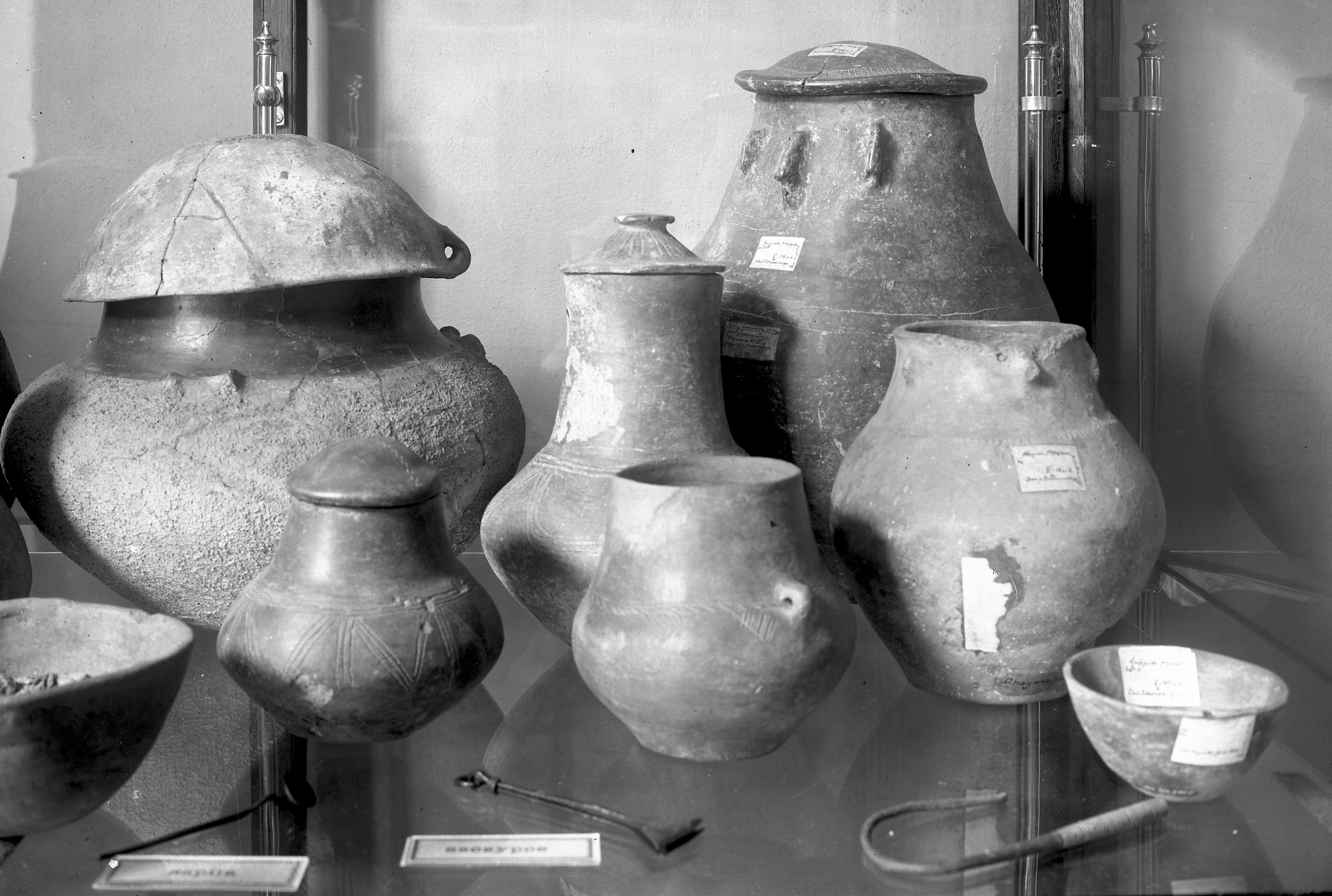

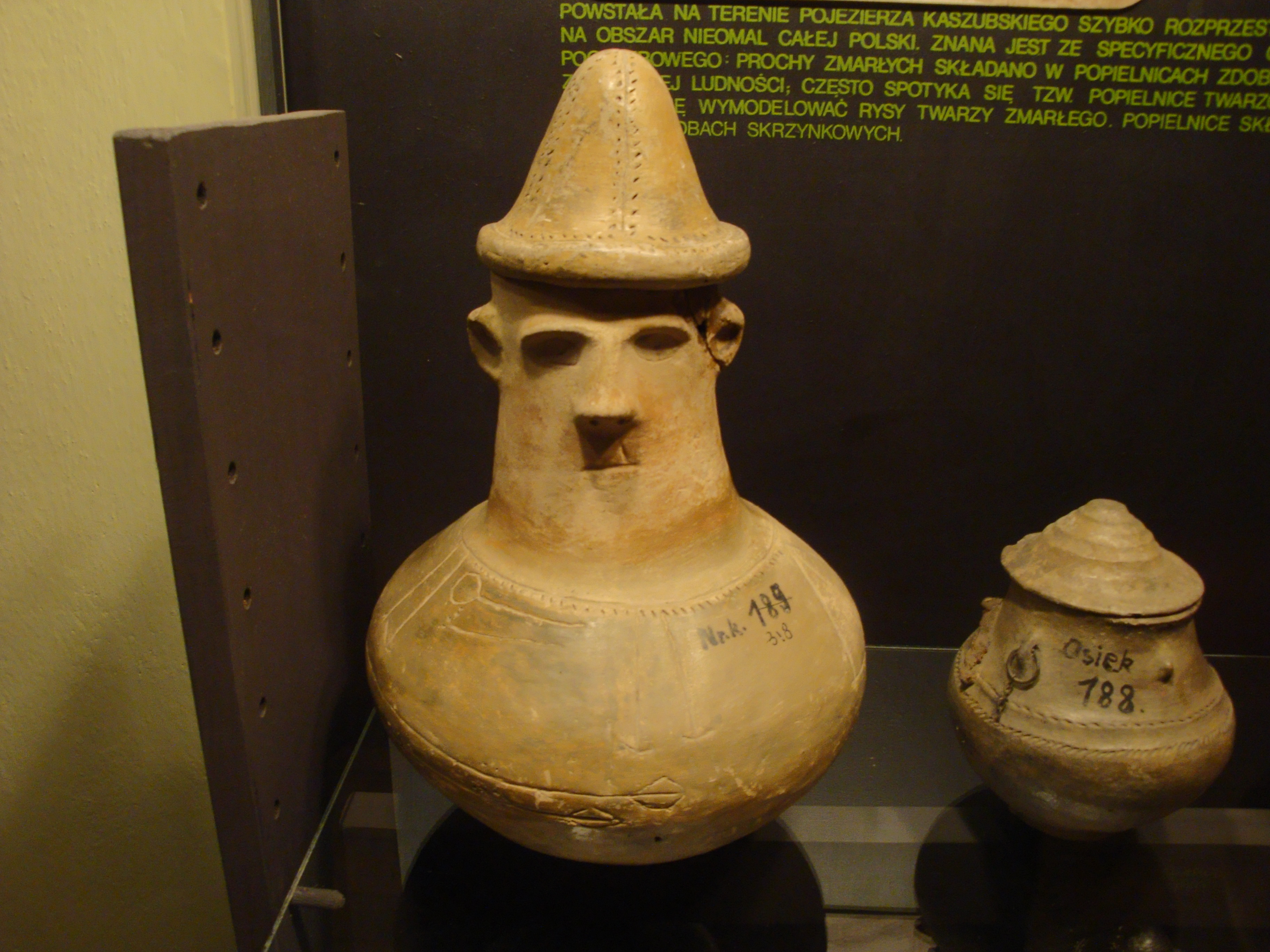

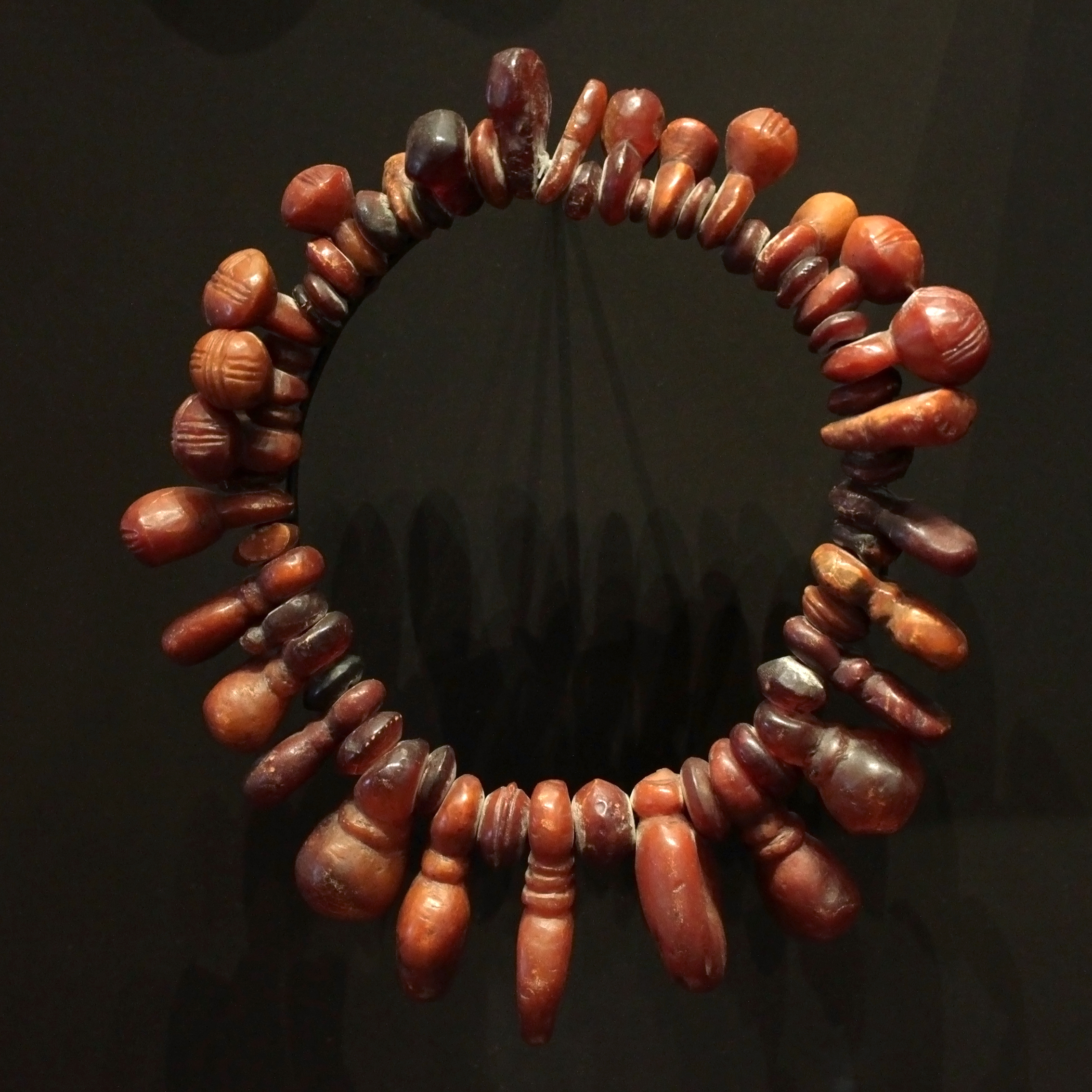
Amber necklace

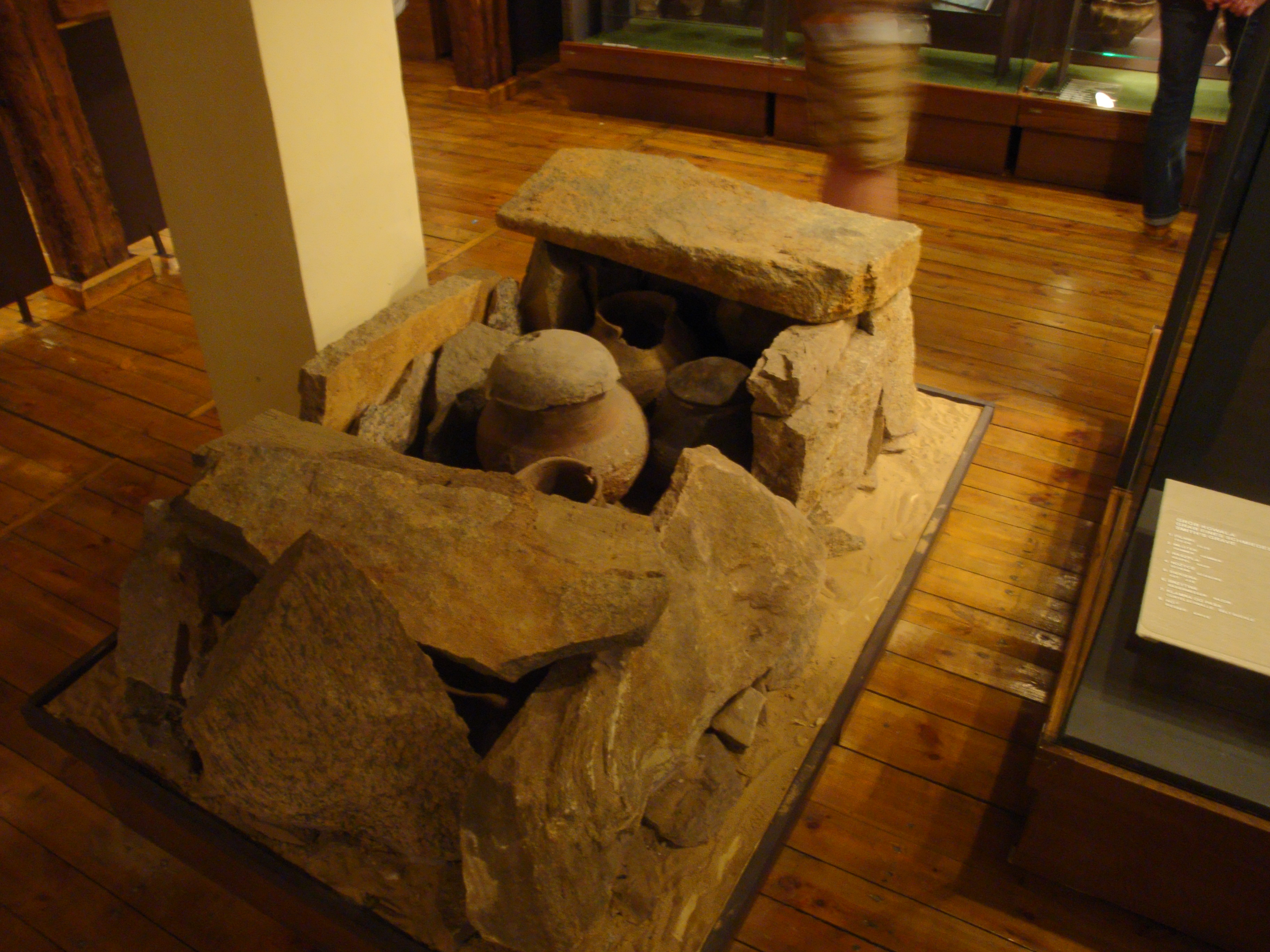

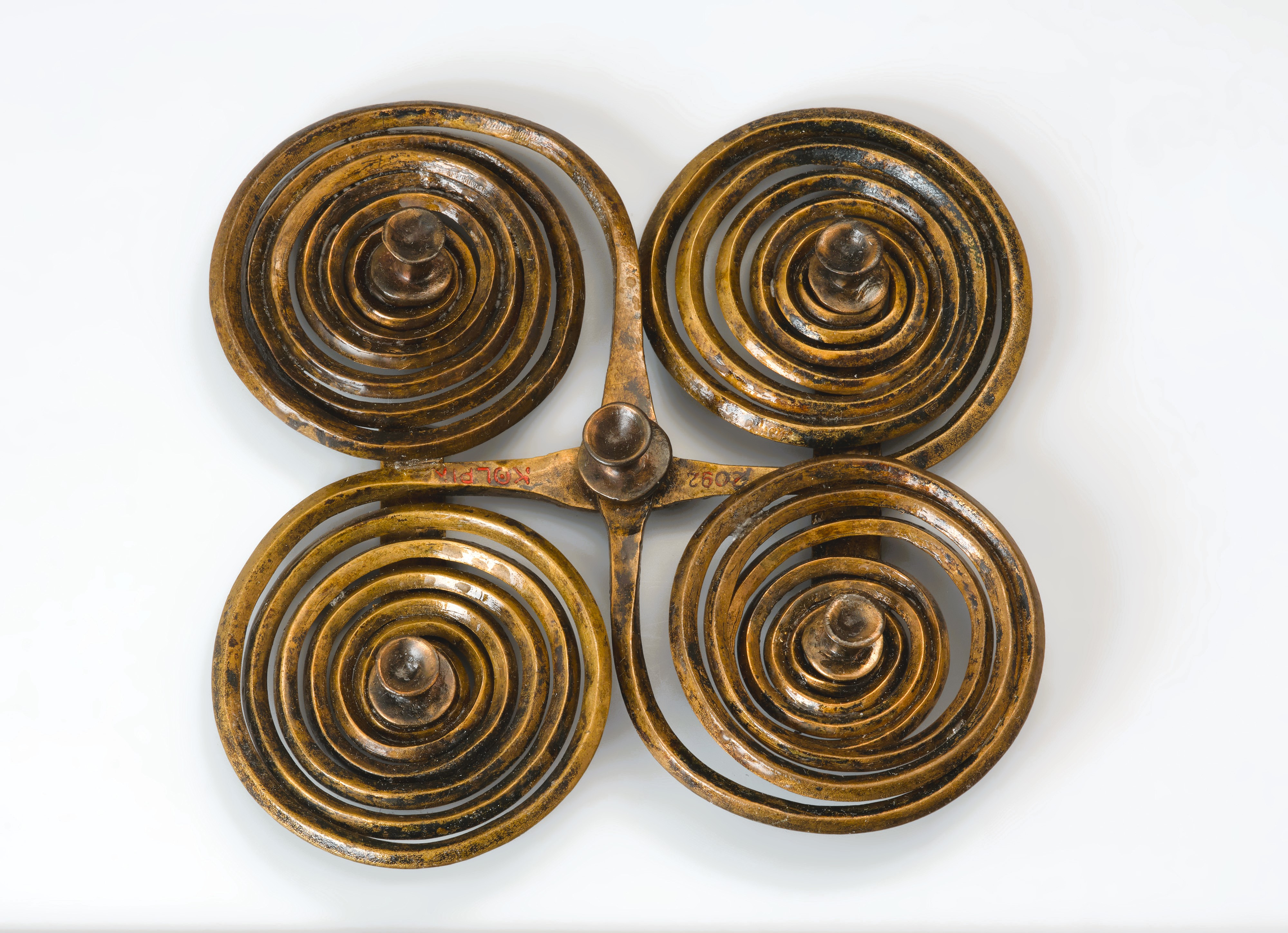

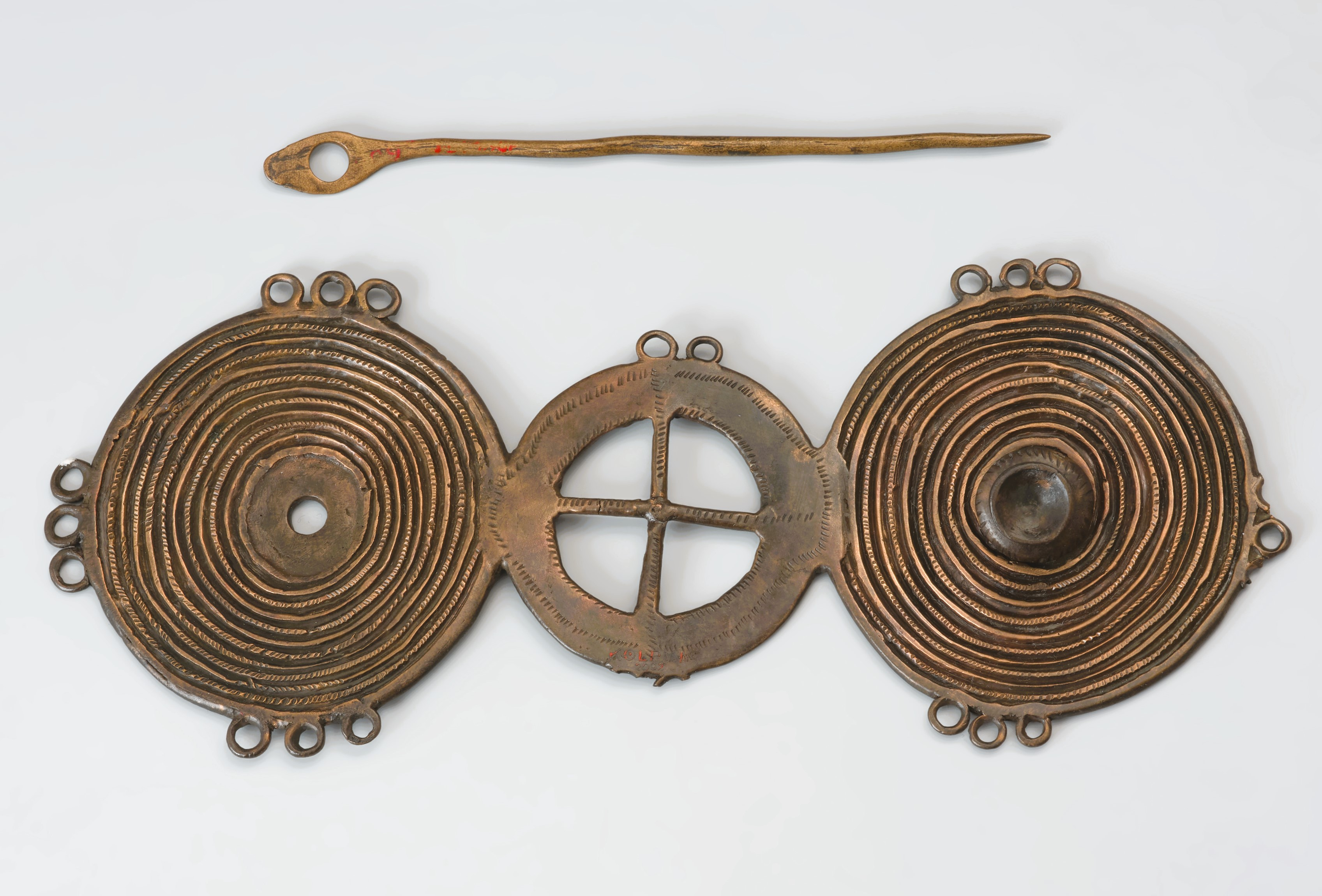

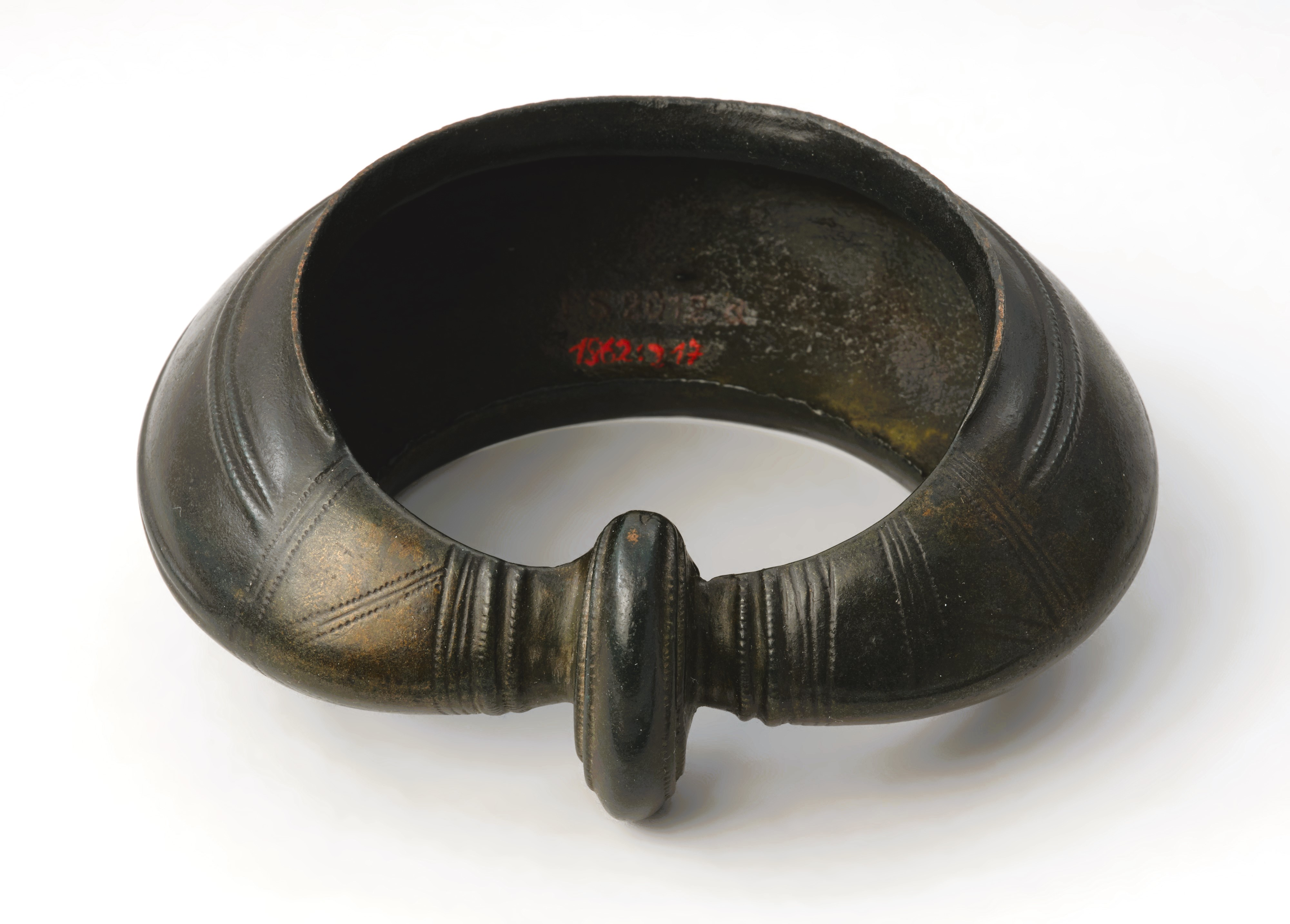

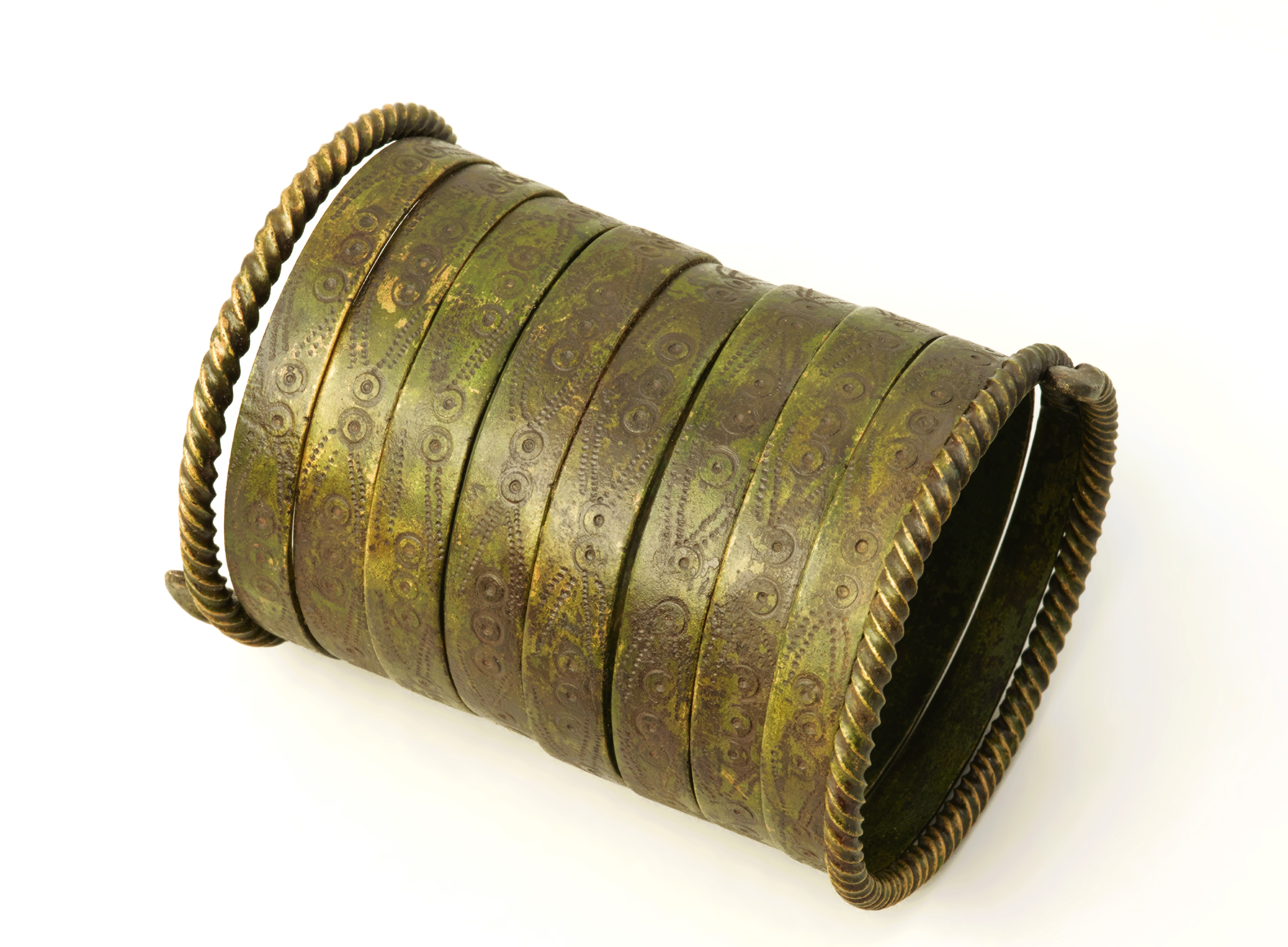

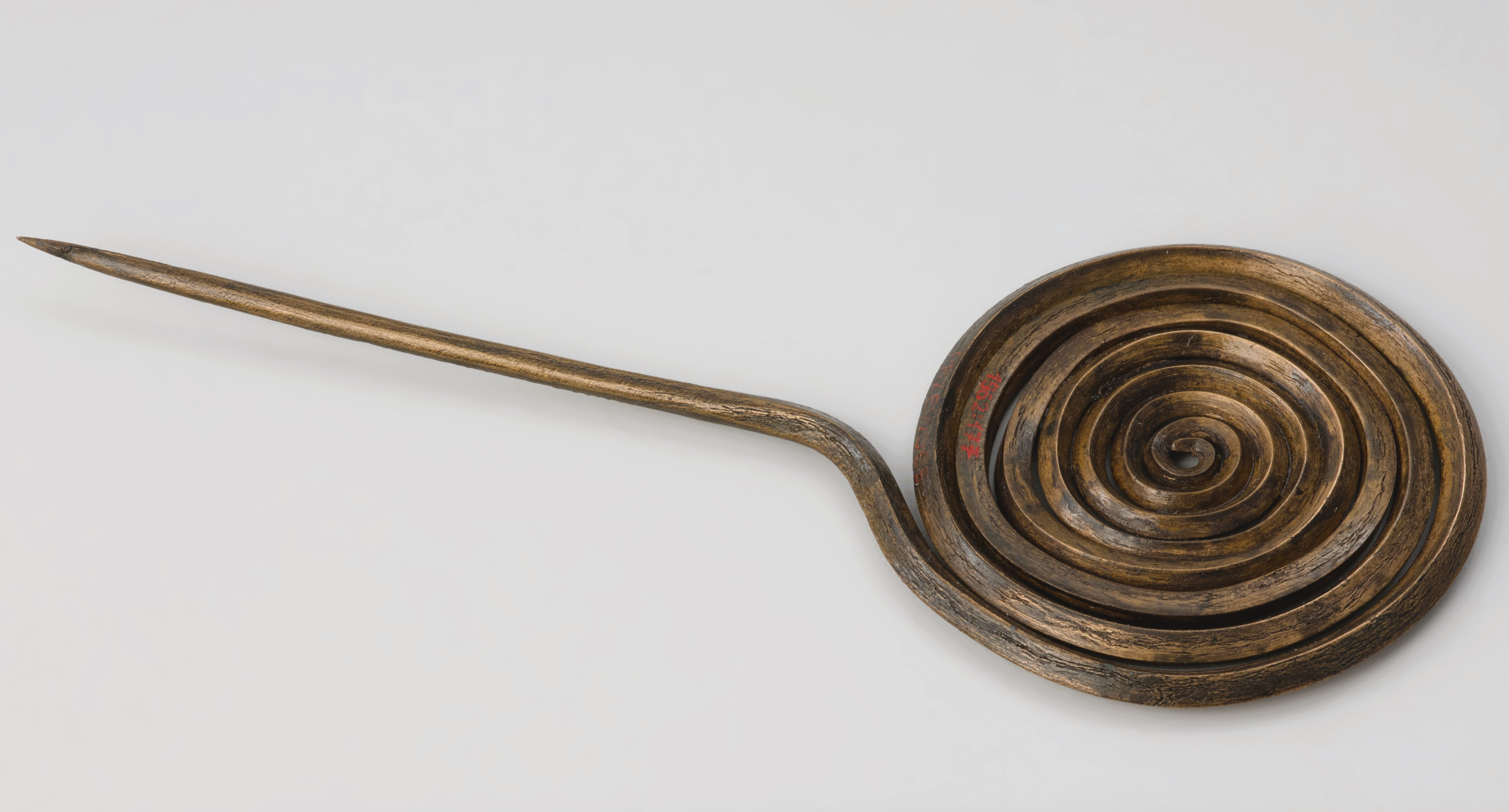

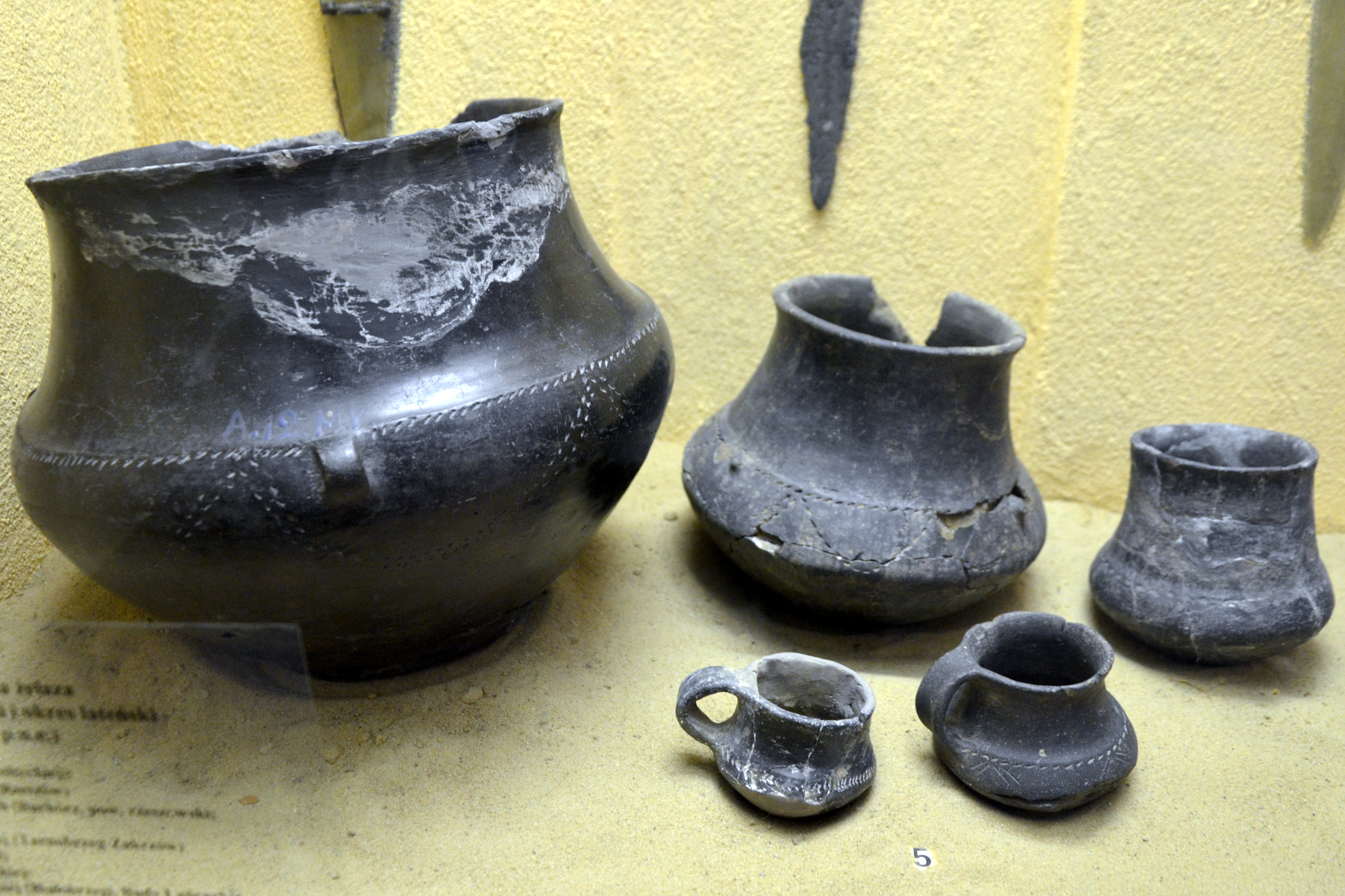

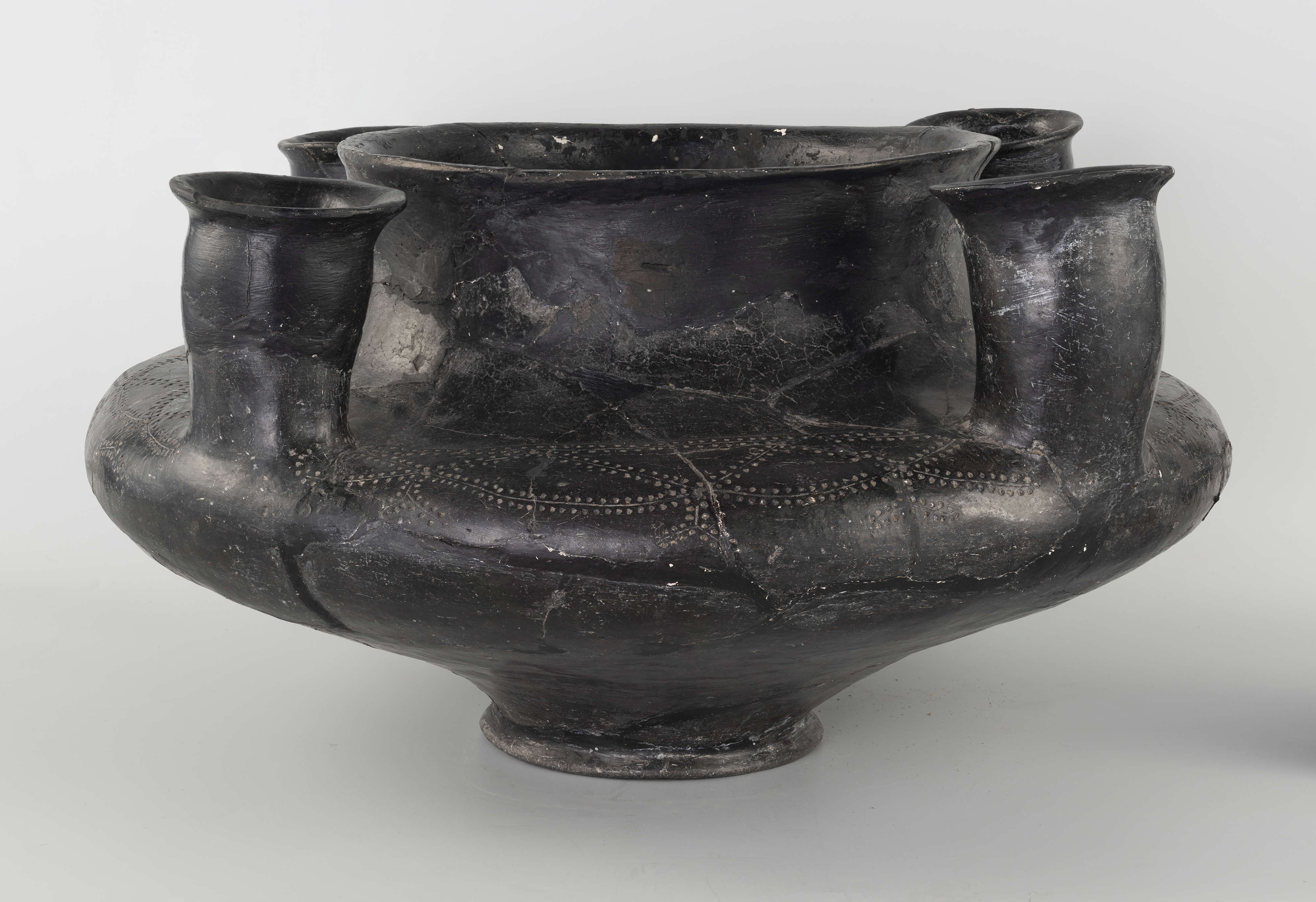

== See also ==
- Bronze and Iron Age Poland
- Prehistoric Europe
- Lusatian culture
- Przeworsk culture
- Nordic Bronze Age
- Gandhara grave culture

== Bibliography ==
- Kokowski, Andrzej (2026). Gräberfelder der pommerschen Kultur in den ehemaligen Provinzen Grenzmark Posen-Westpreußen und Mark – Neumark Brandenburg (mit Nordkante). Katalog (Entdeckungen bis 1945) [Cemeteries of the Pomeranian culture in the former provinces of Grenzmark Posen-Westpreußen and Mark–Neumark Brandenburg (including the northern edge). Catalogue (discoveries up to 1945)]. Lublin: Wydawnictwo Uniwersytetu Marii Curie-Skłodowskiej. ISBN 978-83-68741-33-9..
- van den Boom, Helga (1980–1981). "Die Pommerellische Gesichtsurnenkultur" [The Pomerelian Face Urn culture]. Acta Praehistorica et Archaeologica. 11/12: 219–304.
