= Jastorf culture =

Iron Age material culture

- Geographical range: Germany, Jutland, and Poland
- Period: Iron Age
- Dates: circa 6th century BC – circa 1st century BC
- Preceded by: Nordic Bronze Age, Urnfield culture
- Followed by: Roman Iron Age

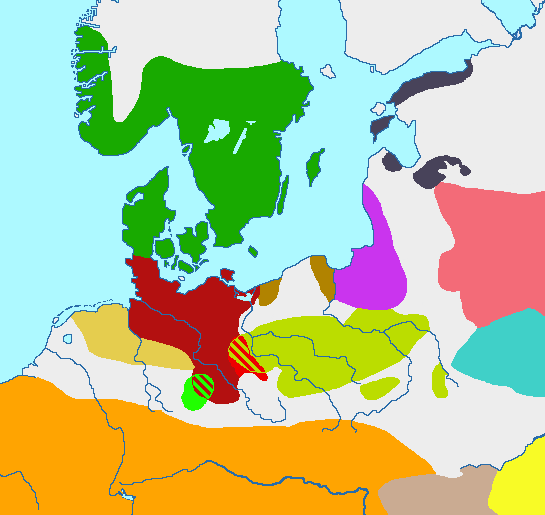
Archaeological cultures of Central Europe in the Late Pre-Roman Iron Age: Nordic group House Urns culture Oksywie culture late phase Jastorf culture Gubin group of Jastorf Przeworsk culture Western Baltic culture Eastern Balt forest zone cultures Zarubintsy culture Celtic

The Jastorf culture was an Iron Age material culture in what is now Germany, stretching north into Jutland, and east into Poland, spanning the 6th to 1st centuries BC, forming the southern part of the Pre-Roman Iron Age.

== Periodization (Central European culture counterpart) ==
- 6th century BC, Jastorf A (Hallstatt D)
- 5th century BC, Jastorf B (La Tène A)
- 400–350 BC, Jastorf C (La Tène B)
- 350–120 BC, Ripdorf (La Tène C)
- 120–1 BC, Seedorf (La Tène D)

== Culture ==
The Jastorf culture is named after a site near the village of Jastorf, Lower Saxony (53°3′N 10°36′E). It was characterized by its use of cremation burials in extensive urnfields and links with the practices of the Northern Bronze Age. Archaeology offers evidence concerning the crystallization of a group in terms of a shared material culture, in which the Northern Bronze Age continued to exert cultural influence on the Celtic Hallstatt culture in the southern parts of the area.

The Jastorf culture extended south to the northern fringes of the Hallstatt culture, while towards the north a general congruence with the late phases of the Northern Bronze Age can be noted. Gravefields in today's Schleswig-Holstein, Mecklenburg, western Pomerania, in Brandenburg and in Lower Saxony show continuity of occupation from the Bronze Age far into the Jastorf period and beyond. The specific contributions from the various quarters witnessing the meeting of Celtic and indigenous cultures during the early periods can not be assessed by the present state of knowledge, although a shift to a northern focus has been noted to accompany the dwindling vitality of continental Celtic cultures later on.

The Jastorf culture's area was first restricted to what is today northern Lower Saxony and Schleswig-Holstein. It then developed a "very expansive" character (Wolfram 1999), expanding towards the Harz hills and reaching by about 500 BC Thuringia, Lower Silesia, and the lower Rhine region, thus covering the southern and western parts of Lower Saxony. This was helped or propitiated by the earlier vacancy or large depopulation of these areas, as it became known in the archaeological record and from Classic sources that local Hallstatt Culture groups considered Celtic or Belgian (more or less Celtic) migrated in its D period to extensive areas further West and South as far as the Mediterranean and Atlantic Europe. In its mature phase, the Jastorf area proper in northern Lower Saxony (Lüneburger Heide, lower Elbe) can be contrasted with the so-called Nienburg (also Harpstedt-Nienburg) group to the west, situated along the Aller and the middle Weser rivers, bordering the Nordwestblock separating it from the La Tène culture proper farther south. The Nienburg group has characteristics of material culture closer to Celtic cultures, and shows evidence of significant contact with the Hallstadt and La Tène cultures. Isolated finds are scattered as far as Berlin and Mecklenburg-Vorpommern.

Finds are mostly from tumuli, flat graves and Brandgruben graves or cremation pits. There are few and modest grave goods, with the weapon deposits characteristic of migration period graves completely absent.

The southernmost extent of Germanic cultures beyond Jastorf has recently been accounted for at the final stages of the Pre-Roman Iron Age, with the paucity of Late-La Téne bracelet-types in Thuringia and northeastern Hesse proposed to suggest population movements between the central-Elbe/Saale region, Main-Franconia and the edge of the Alps and to have been triggered by the spread of the Przeworsk culture. The demographic vacuum left in the south of Germany around the upper Danube and Rhine rivers, by the migrations of Celtic groups hitherto there into much richer lands in Gaul, Spain, Pannonia and Northern Italy from 400 BC probably also played a role.

== Legacy ==
The cultures of the Pre-Roman Iron Age are hypothesized to be the origin of the Germanic languages. Herwig Wolfram locates the initial stages of Grimm's Law here.

== Gallery ==
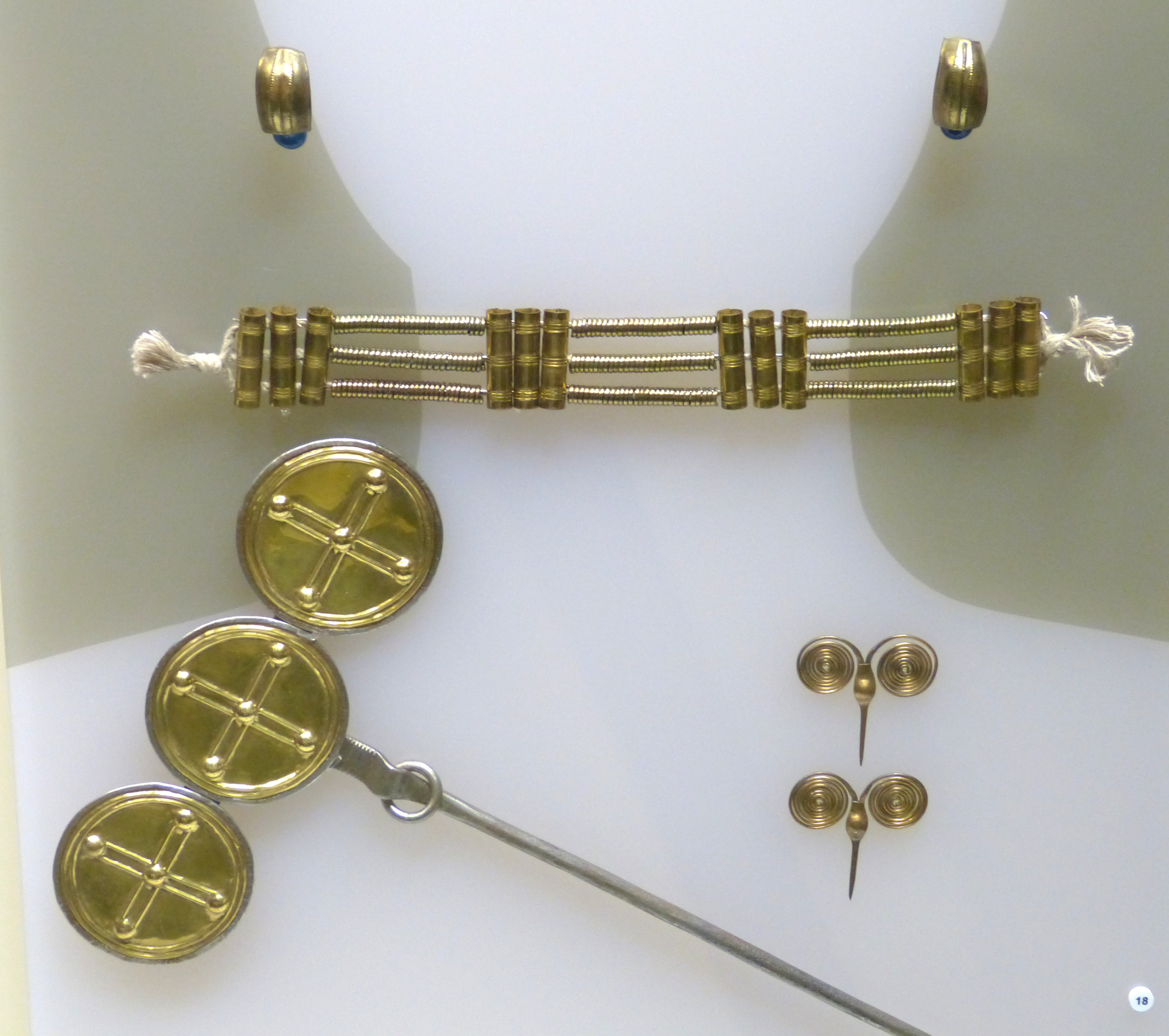
Gold ornaments

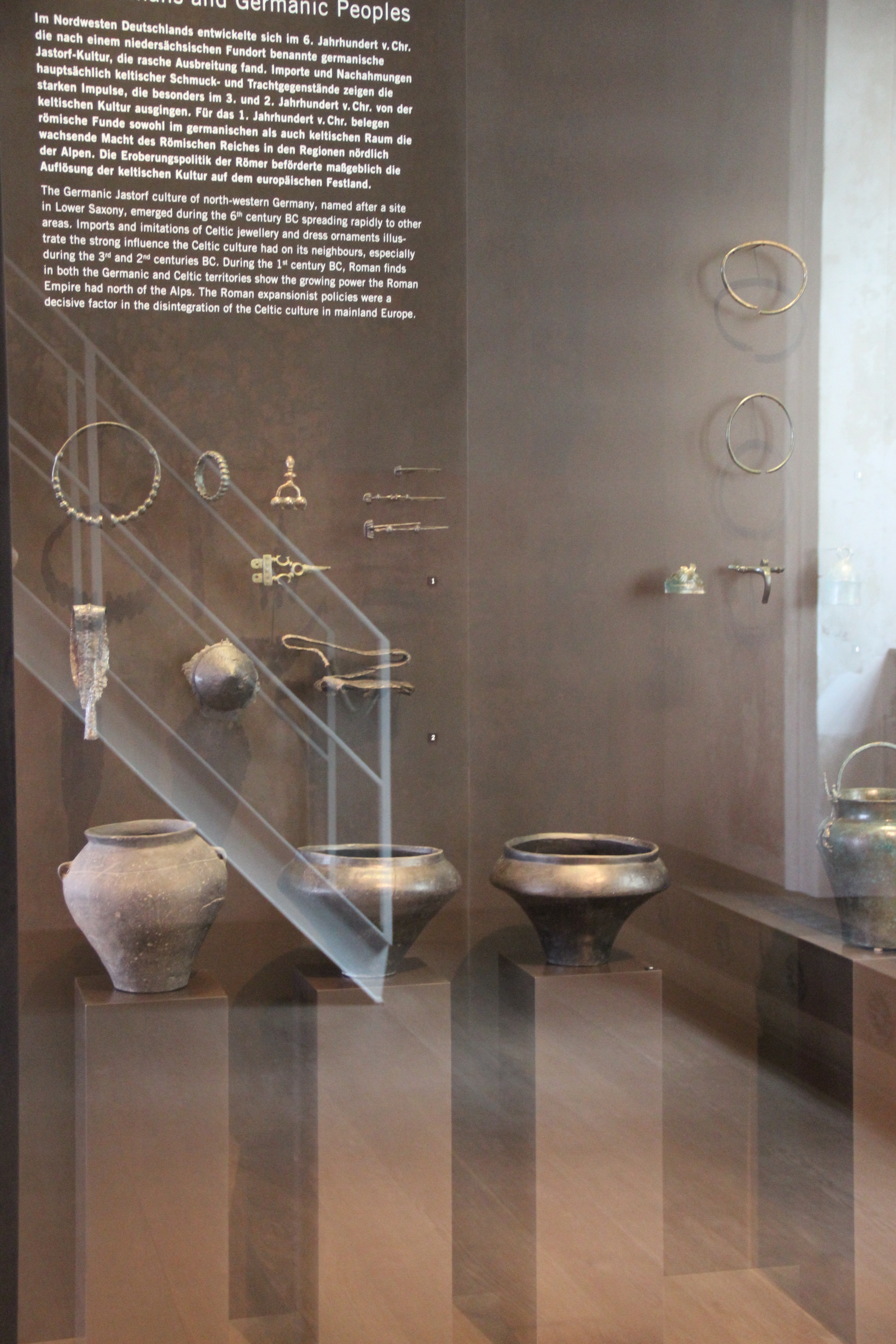
Various artefacts

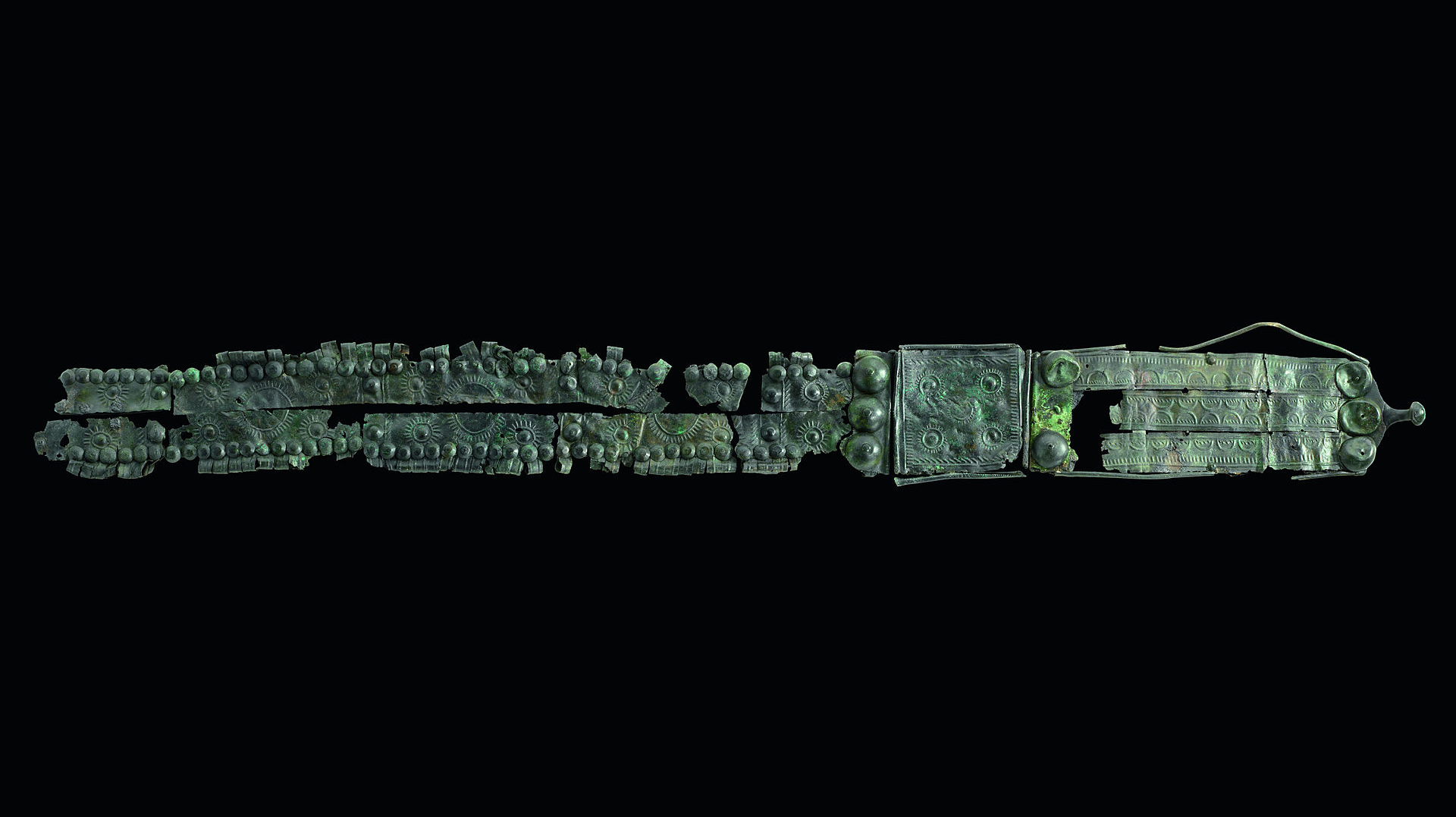
Holstein beltplate, 250–100 BC

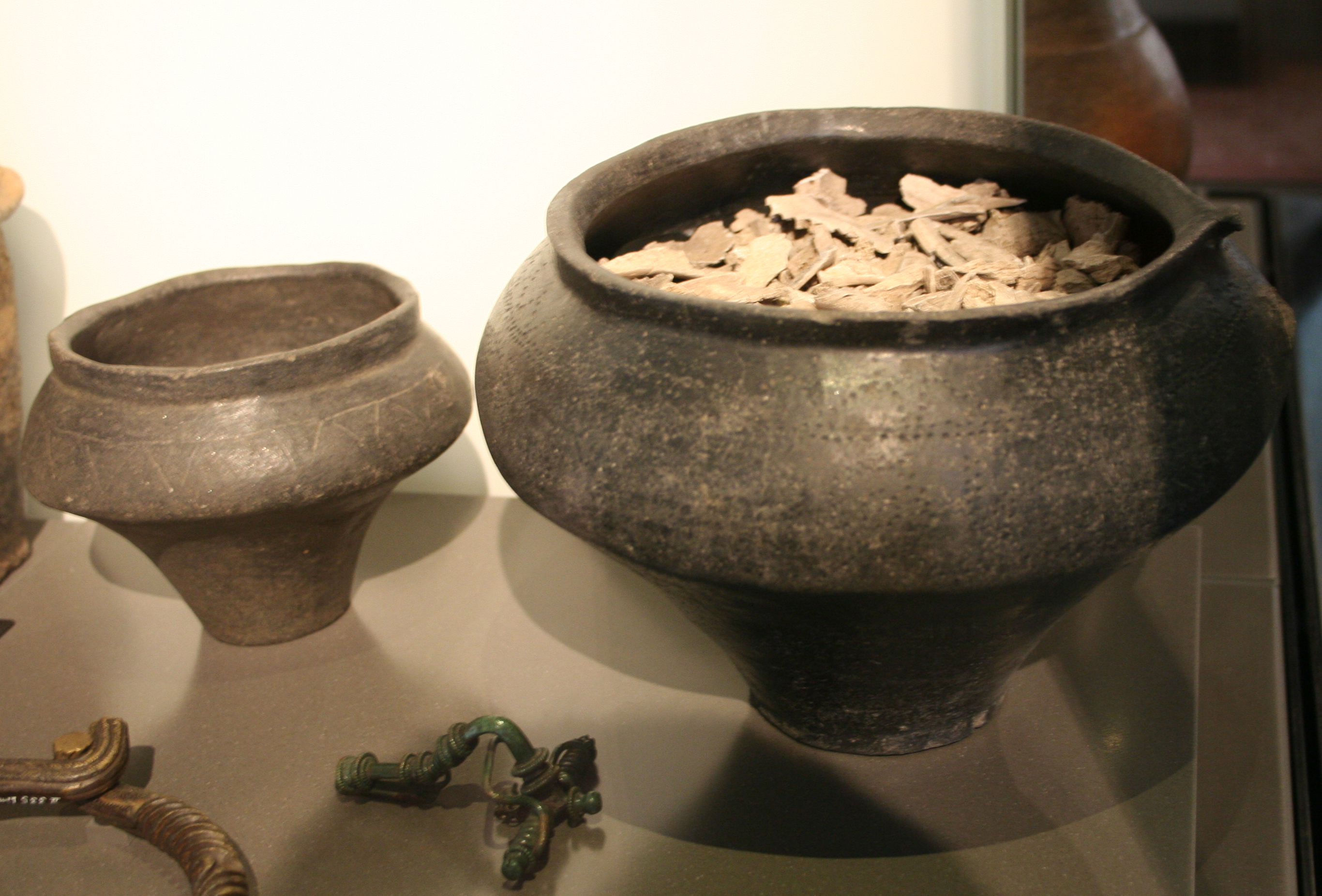
Funerary ceramic vessels and metal brooch

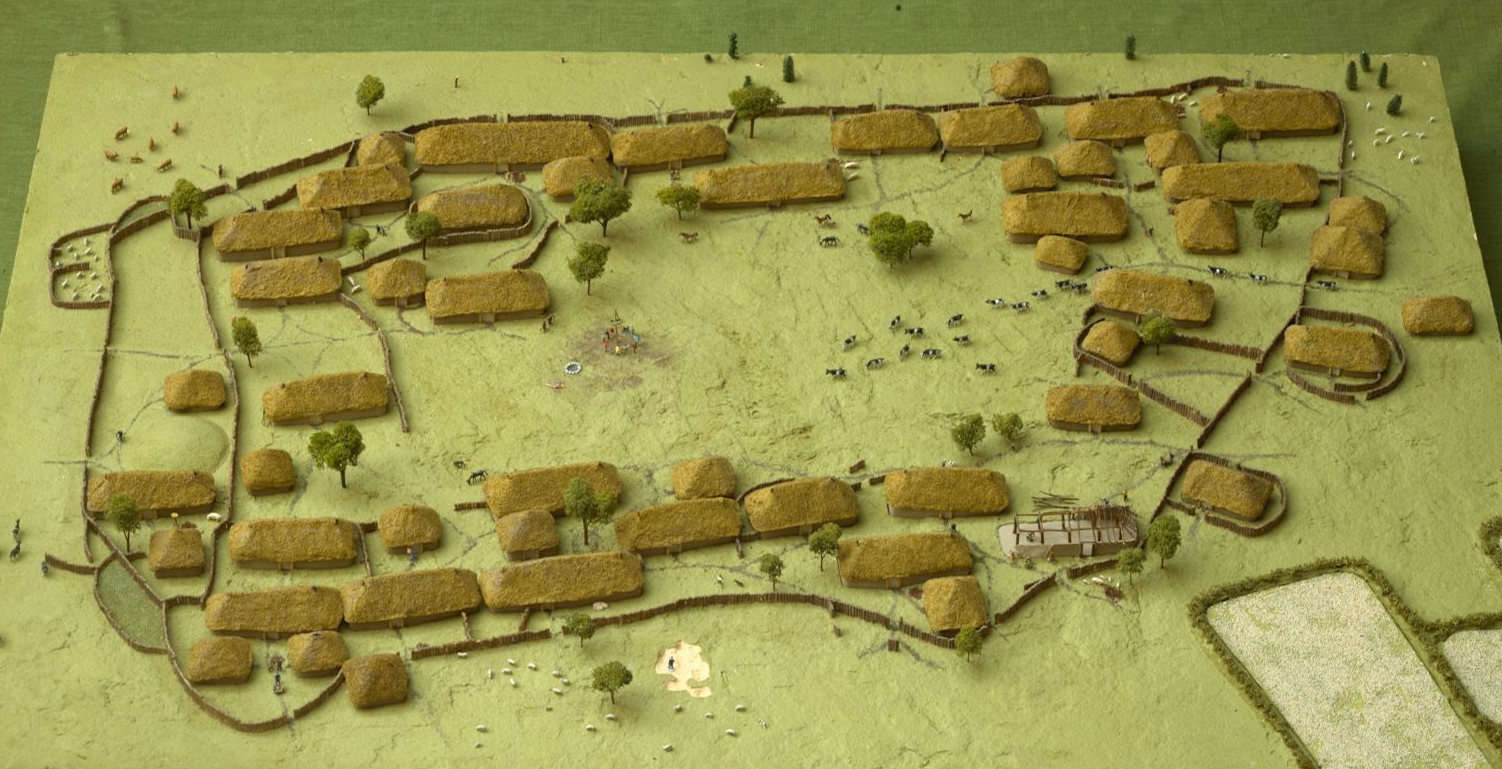
Model of Hodde Iron Age village, Denmark, c. 100 BC

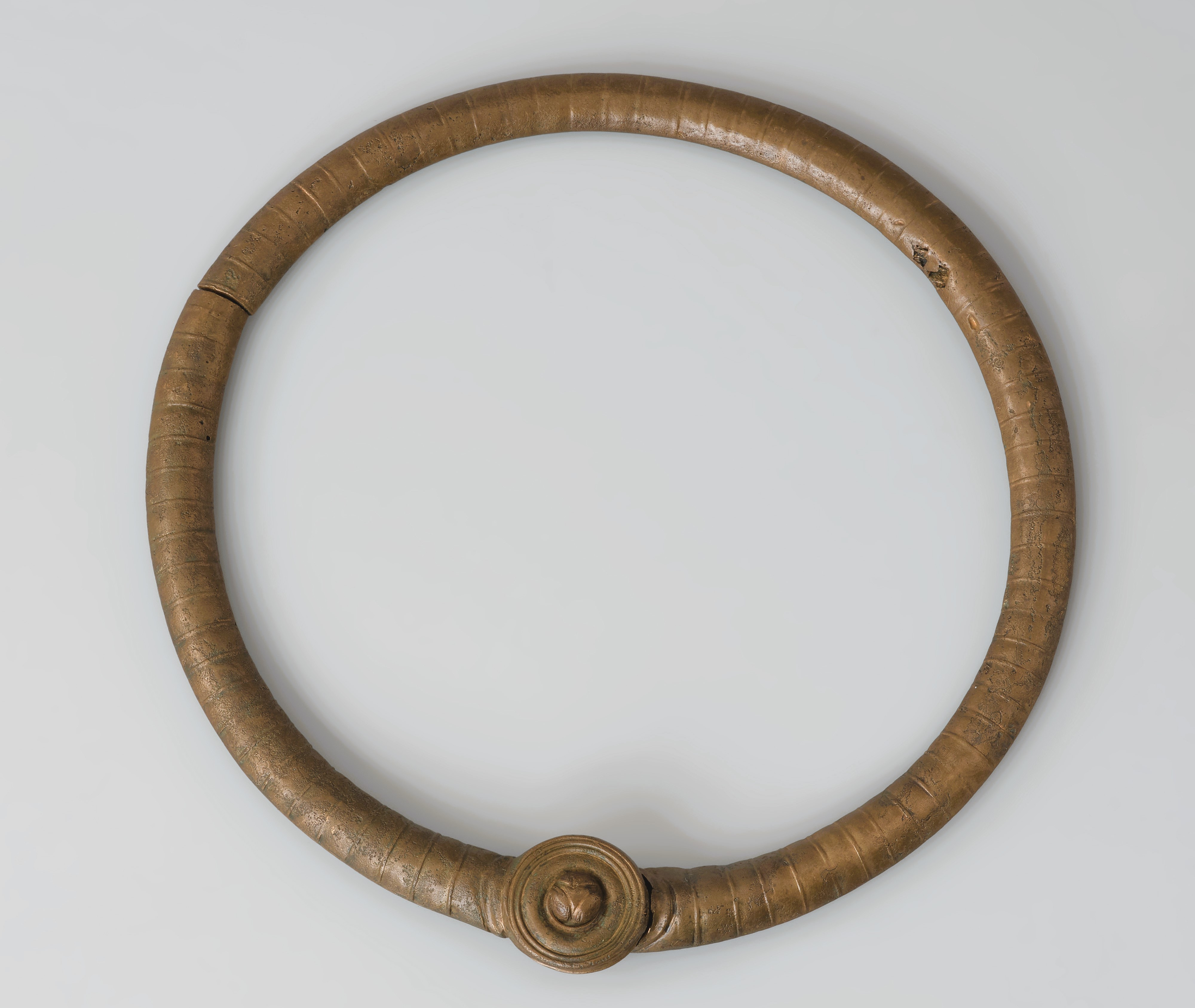
Bronze neck-ring from Kopaniewo, Poland

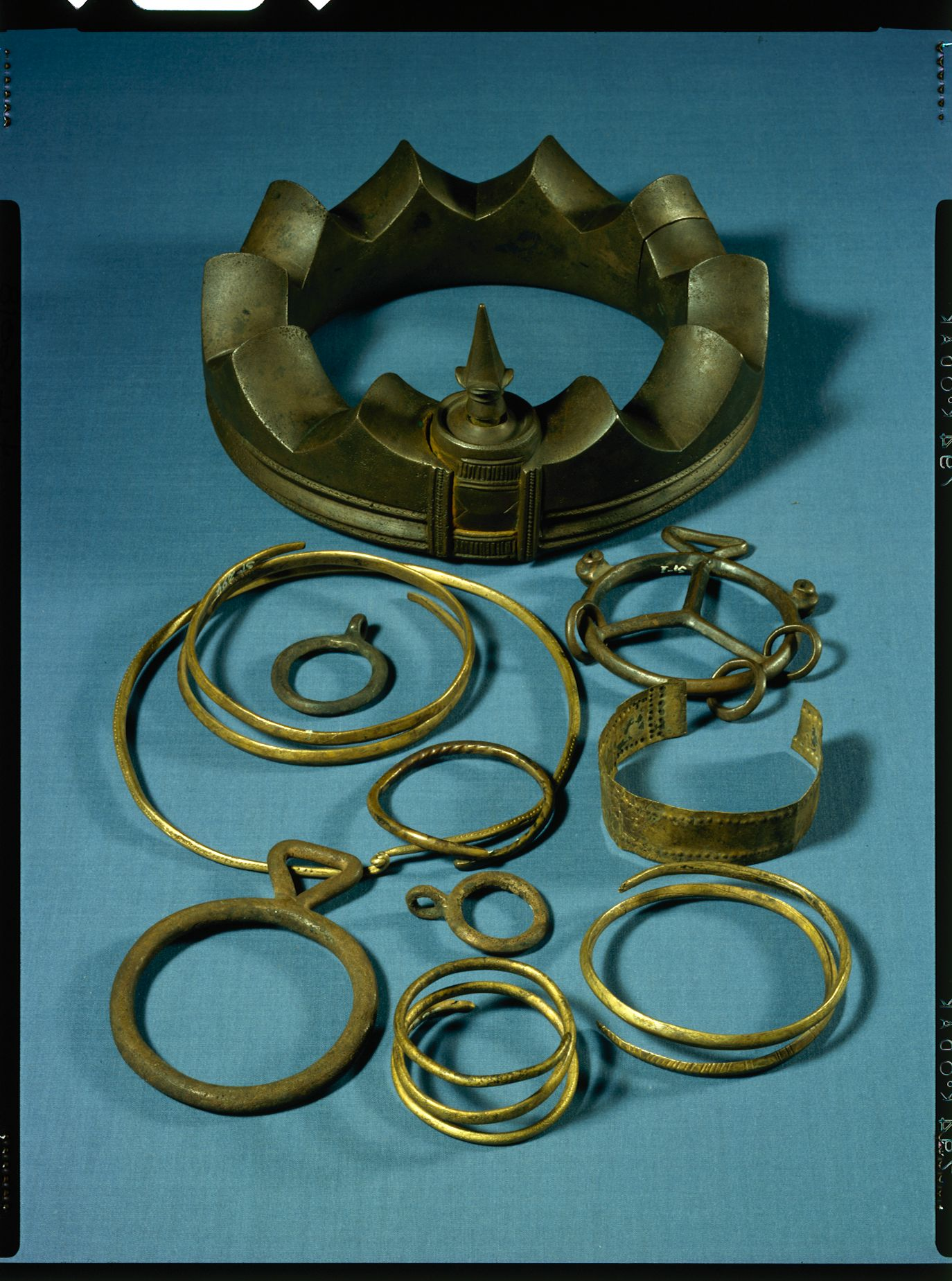
Crown-shaped necklace and bronze rings, Denmark

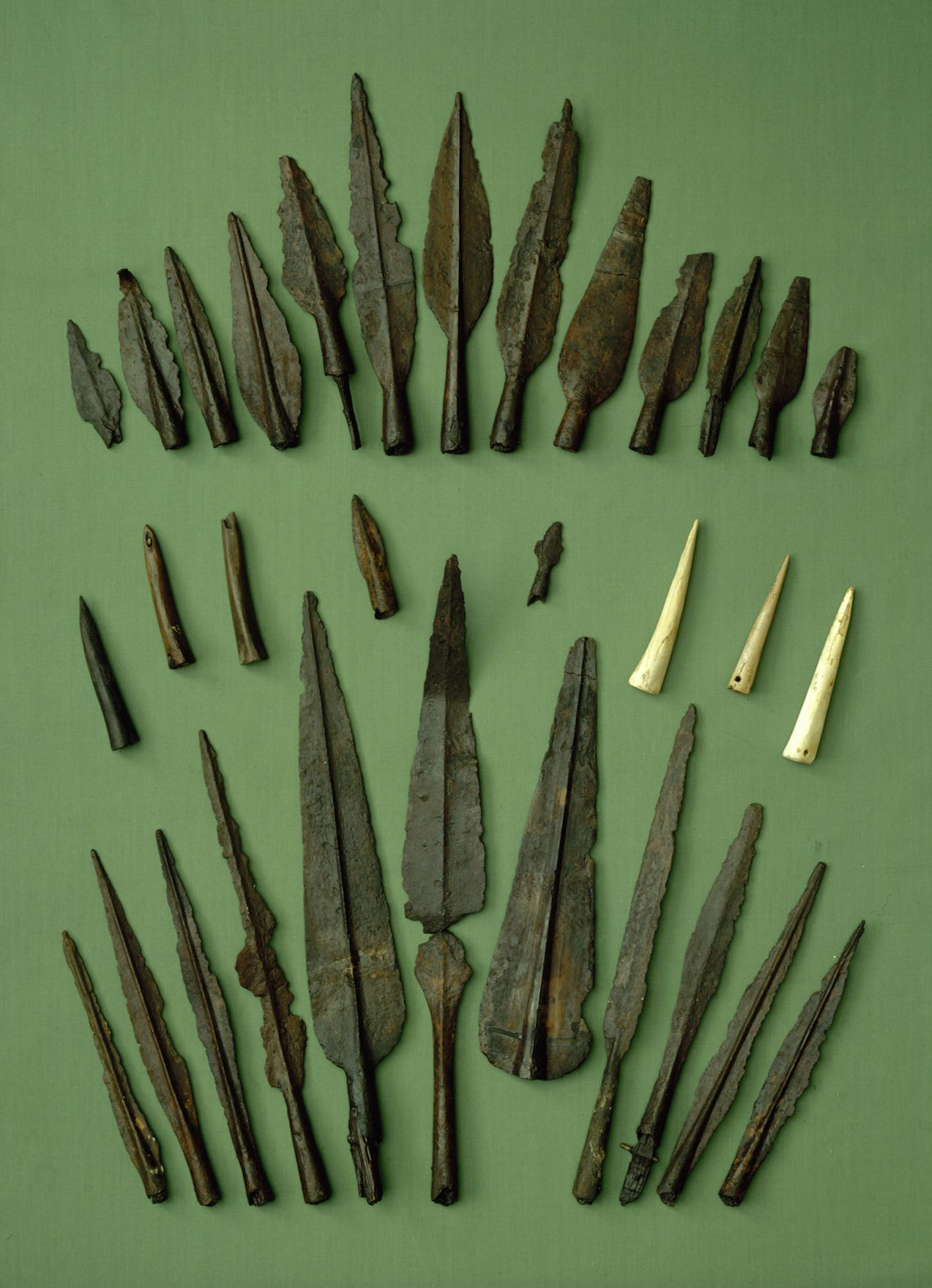
Iron spears from Hjortspring, Denmark

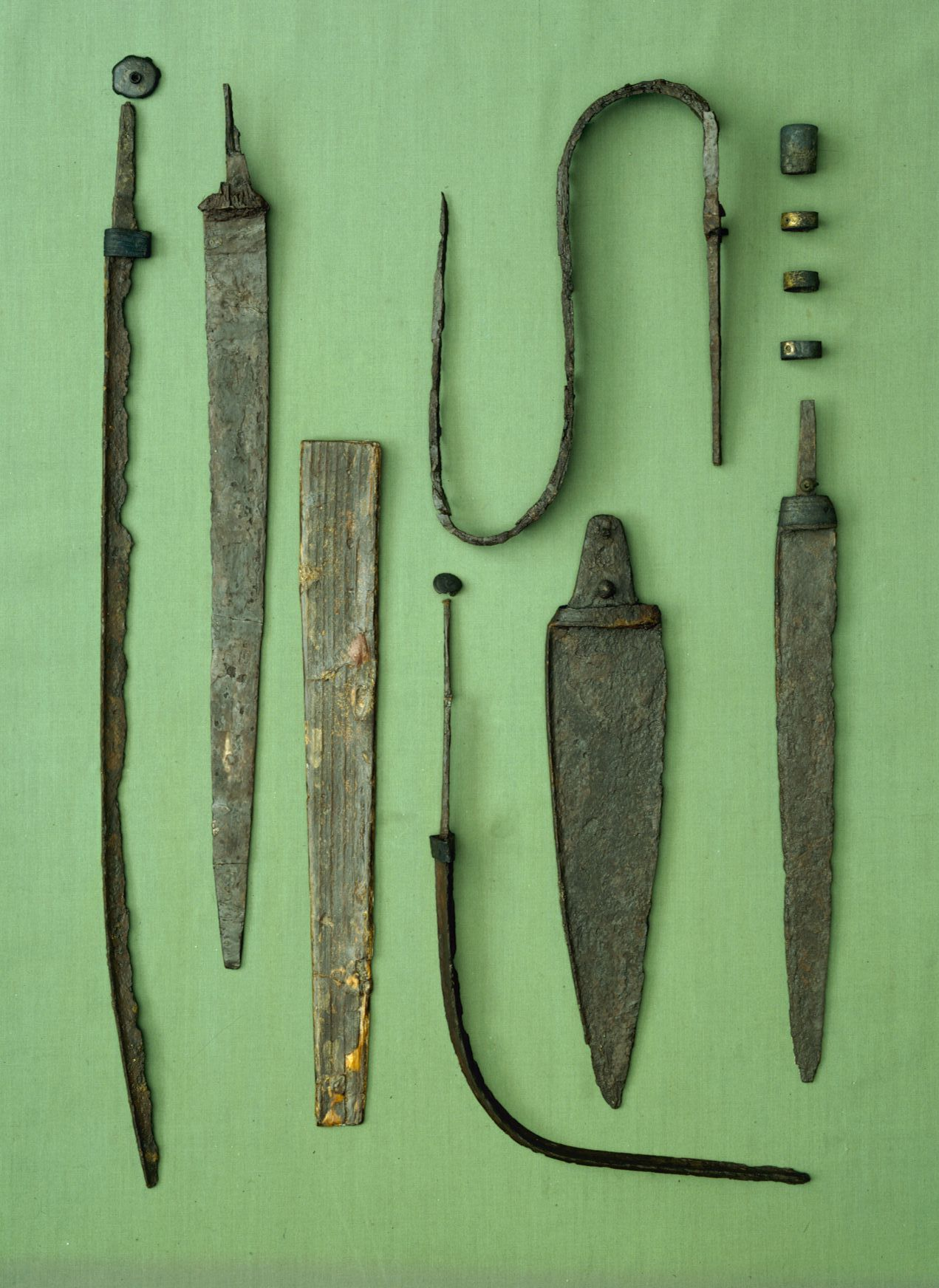
Swords and scabbards from Hjortspring

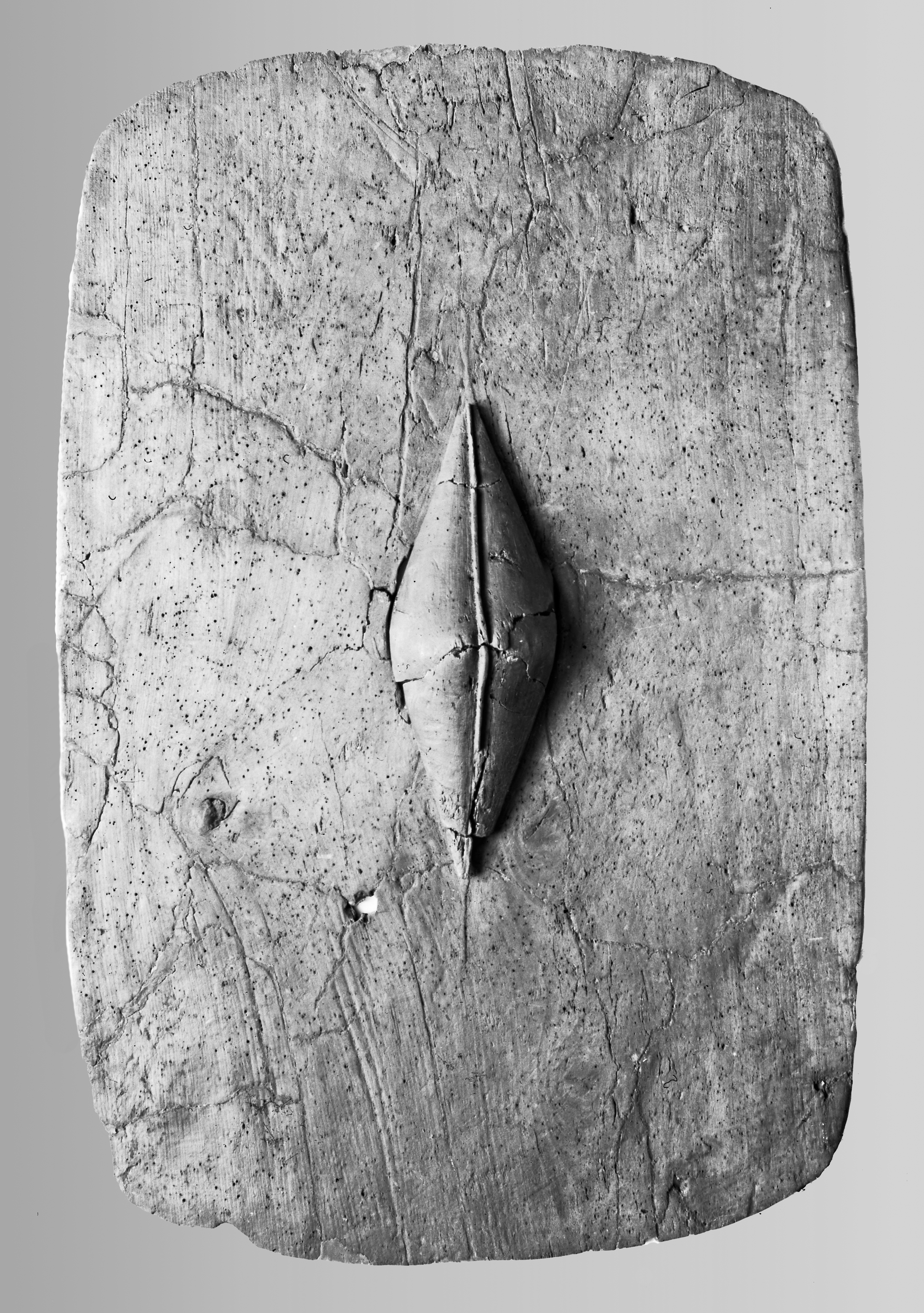
Shield from Hjortspring

== See also ==
- Germanic peoples
- Archaeology of Northern Europe

== Sources ==
- J. Brandt, Jastorf und Latène. Internat. Arch. 66 (2001)
- W. Künnemann, Jastorf – Geschichte und Inhalt eines archäologischen Kulturbegriffs, Die Kunde N. F. 46 (1995), 61–122.
- Herwig Wolfram, Die Germanen, Beck (1999).
- Heinrich Krüger: Die Jastorfkultur in den Kreisen Lüchow-Dannenberg, Lüneburg, Uelzen und Soltau. 1961, ISBN 3-529-01501-6
- Martens, Jes (2014), "Jastorf and Jutland (On the northern extent of the so-called Jastorf Culture)", Das Jastorf-Konzept und die vorrömische Eisenzeit im nördlichen Mitteleuropa
- Wofagiewicz, Ryszard (1997), "The Pre-Roman Iron Age in Pomerania", Chronological Problems of the Pre-Roman Iron Age in Northern Europe, Arkæologiske skrifter, vol. 7
