= Nordwestblock =

Hypothetical European cultural region

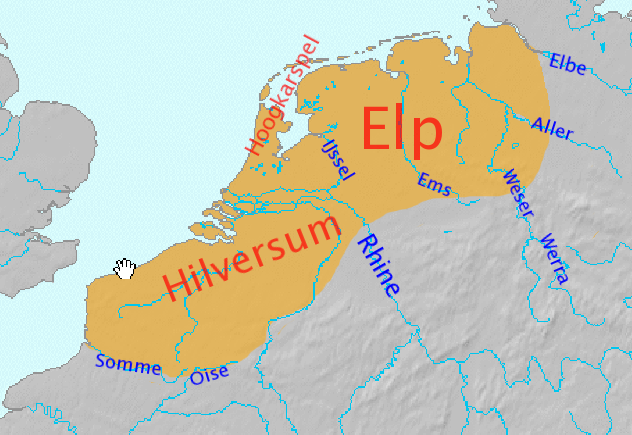
Archaeological cultures of the Bronze Age associated with the Nordwestblock area

The Nordwestblock (German, "Northwest Block") is a hypothetical Northwestern European cultural region that some scholars propose as a prehistoric culture in the present-day Netherlands, Belgium, far-northern France, and northwestern Germany, in an area approximately bounded by the Somme, Oise, Meuse and Elbe rivers, possibly extending to the eastern part of what is now England, during the Bronze and Iron Ages from the 3rd to the 1st millennia BCE, up to the onset of historical sources, in the 1st century BCE.

The theory was first proposed by two authors working independently: Hans Kuhn and Maurits Gysseling, whose proposal included research indicating that another language may have existed somewhere in between Germanic and Celtic in the Belgian region.

The term Nordwestblock itself was coined by Hans Kuhn, who considered the inhabitants of the area neither Germanic nor Celtic and so attributed to the people a distinct ethnicity or culture up to the Iron Age. So far, this has not been proven or disproven.

== Language hypotheses ==
The hypothetical language or languages spoken by the Iron Age Nordwestblock population are a matter of speculation, as there are no written records of such languages as is the case with the Germanic language, but can be inferred based on analysis of substrate features in the primarily West Germanic languages that later came to be spoken in the region (for example, areal loanwords of unknown origin, and the presence of certain geminate consonants that cannot be explained by inheritance from Proto-Indo-European), or by analysis of place-names (toponymy and hydronymy). Broadly, this substrate area is sometimes called the North-West European substratum. Kuhn speculated on linguistic affinity of this substratum to the Venetic language, while other hypotheses connect the Northwestblock with the Rhaetic ("Tyrsenian") or generic Indo-European languages of the centum type (Illyrian, "Old European"). Gysseling suspected an intermediate Belgian language between Germanic and Celtic, that might have been affiliated to Italic. According to Luc van Durme, a Belgian linguist, toponymic evidence of a former Celtic presence in the Low Countries is almost completely absent. Kuhn noted that since, in Proto-Indo-European (PIE), the phoneme */b/ was very rare, and since PIE */b/, via Grimm's law, is the main source of regularly inherited /p/ in words in Germanic languages (except after fricatives, e.g. initial *sp- from PIE *(s)p-), the many words in which /p/ occurs must have some other language as their source. Similarly, in Celtic, PIE */p/ disappeared and in regularly-inherited words did not reappear in p-Celtic languages except as a result of Proto-Celtic *kʷ becoming *p. All that taken together means that any word starting with a /p/ in a Germanic language that is not evidently borrowed from either Latin or a p-Celtic language, such as Gaulish, must be a loan from another language. Kuhn ascribes those words to the Nordwestblock language.

Linguist Peter Schrijver assumes the pre-existence of pre-Indo-European languages linked to the archeological Linear Pottery culture and to a family of languages featuring complex verbs spoken by the earliest Neolithic farmers, of which the Northwest Caucasian languages might have been the sole survivors. Although assumed to have left traces within all other Indo-European languages as well, the influence of an unknown substrate would have been especially strong on Celtic languages originating north of the Alps and on the region including Belgium and the Rhineland.

It is uncertain when Germanic began to gain a foothold in the area. The Nordwestblock region north of the Rhine is traditionally conceived as belonging to the realms of the Northern Bronze Age, with the Harpstedt Iron Age generally assumed to represent the Germanic precedents west of the Jastorf culture. The general development converged with the emergence of Germanic within other previously Northern Bronze Age regions to the east, maybe also involving a certain degree of Germanic cultural diffusion. From about the 1st century CE, that region saw the development of the "Weser–Rhine" group of West Germanic dialects which gave rise to Old Frankish from the 4th century.

The issue still remains unresolved and so far no conclusive evidence has been forwarded to support any alternative. Mallory considers the issue a salutary reminder that some anonymous linguistic groups that do not fully obey the current classification may have survived to the beginning of historical records.

== Prehistoric composition ==
The following prehistoric cultures have been attributed to the region and are compatible with but do not necessarily prove the Nordwestblock hypothesis.

The Bell Beaker culture (2700–2100 BCE) is thought to originate from the same geographic area, as early stages of the culture apparently derived from early Corded Ware culture elements, with the Netherlands/Rhineland region as probably the most widely accepted site of origin (J. P. Mallory, EIEC p. 53).

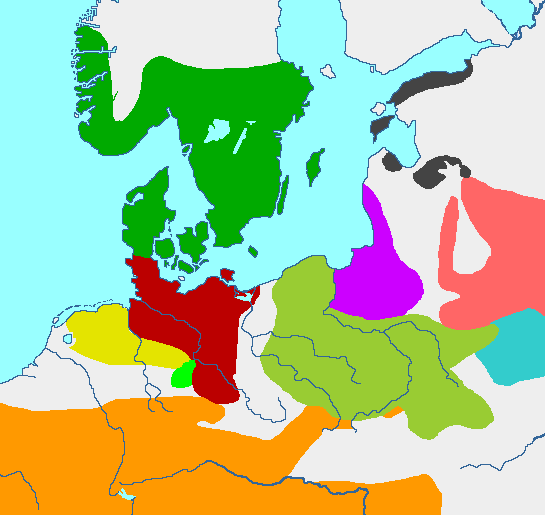
European early Iron Age cultures: Nordic group Jastorf culture Harpstedt-Nienburger group Celtic groups Pomeranian culture House Urns culture East-Baltic cultures of forest zone West-Baltic culture of cairns Milograd culture Estonic group

The Bell Beaker culture locally developed into the Bronze Age Barbed Wire Beaker culture (2100–1800 BCE). In the 2nd millennium BCE, the region was at the boundary between the Atlantic and Nordic horizons, split up in a northern and a southern region, roughly divided by the course of the Rhine. To the north emerged the Elp culture (1800-800 BCE), featuring an initial tumulus phase showing a close relationship to other Northern European tumulus groups (sharing pottery of low quality: Kümmerkeramik) and a subsequent smooth local transformation to the Urnfield culture (1200–800 BCE). The southern region became dominated by the Hilversum culture (1800–800 BCE), which apparently inherited the previous Barbed Wire Beaker cultural ties with Britain.

From 800 BCE onward, the southern area was influenced by the Celtic or proto-Celtic Hallstatt culture. The current view in the Netherlands holds that subsequent Iron Age innovations did not involve substantial Celtic intrusions but featured a local development from Bronze Age culture.

From 750-600 BCE, areas formerly occupied by the Elp culture emerged as the probably-Germanic Harpstedt culture west of the Germanic Jastorf culture, and the southern parts became assimilated to the Celtic La Tène culture, as is consistent with Julius Caesar's account of the Rhine forming the boundary between Celtic and Germanic tribes.

Later, the Roman retreat resulted in the disappearance of imported products like ceramics and coins and a return to virtually-unchanged local Iron Age production methods. To the north, people continued to live in the same three-aisled farmhouse, and to the east, completely-new types of buildings arose. More to the south, in Belgium, archaeological results of the period point to immigration from the north.

== Roman era ==
With the onset of historical records (Tacitus, 1st century), the area was generally called the border region between Celtic (Gaulish) and Germanic influence.

Tribes located in the area include the Batavians, Belgae, Chatti, Hermunduri, Cheruscii, Salii, Sicambri, Tencteri and Usipetes or Usipii. Caesar took the course of the Rhine to be the boundary between Gauls and Germans (Germanic people) but also mentioned that a large part of the Belgae had ancestry from east of the Rhine and that one part were even known collectively as "Germani" (the so-called "Germani cisrhenani"). The Belgae were therefore considered Gaulish (the Usipetes Germanic etc.) because of their position with respect to the Rhine, and not in the modern linguistic sense of the terms.

Some of those tribes would later join the Frankish confederation.

== See also ==
- Ambrones
- Archaeology of Northern Europe
- Dutch mythology
- Germanic substrate hypothesis
- Old Europe (archaeology)
- Old European hydronymy
