= Germanic sound shifts =

Germanic sound shifts are the phonological developments (sound changes) from the Proto-Indo-European language (PIE) to Proto-Germanic, in Proto-Germanic itself, and in various Germanic subfamilies and languages.

== PIE to Proto-Germanic ==
- Germanic spirant law
- Grimm's law
- Holtzmann's law
- Sievers' law
- Verner's law
- Kluge's law

== In Proto-Germanic ==
- Germanic a-mutation

== Germanic subfamilies and languages ==
- Germanic umlaut (all of the early languages except for Gothic)
- Great Vowel Shift (English)
- High German consonant shift
- Ingvaeonic nasal spirant law (attested in Old English, Old Frisian and Old Saxon)
- West Germanic gemination

== See also ==
- Germanic languages
- Germanic substrate hypothesis
