= House Urns culture =

Early Iron Age culture in central Germany

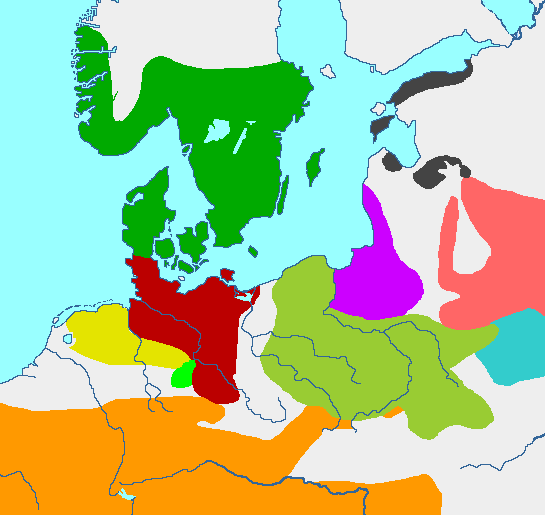
European early Iron Age cultures: Nordic group Jastorf culture Harpstedt-Nienburger group Celtic groups Pomeranian culture House Urn culture East-Baltic cultures of forest zone West-Baltic culture of cairns Milograd culture Estonic group

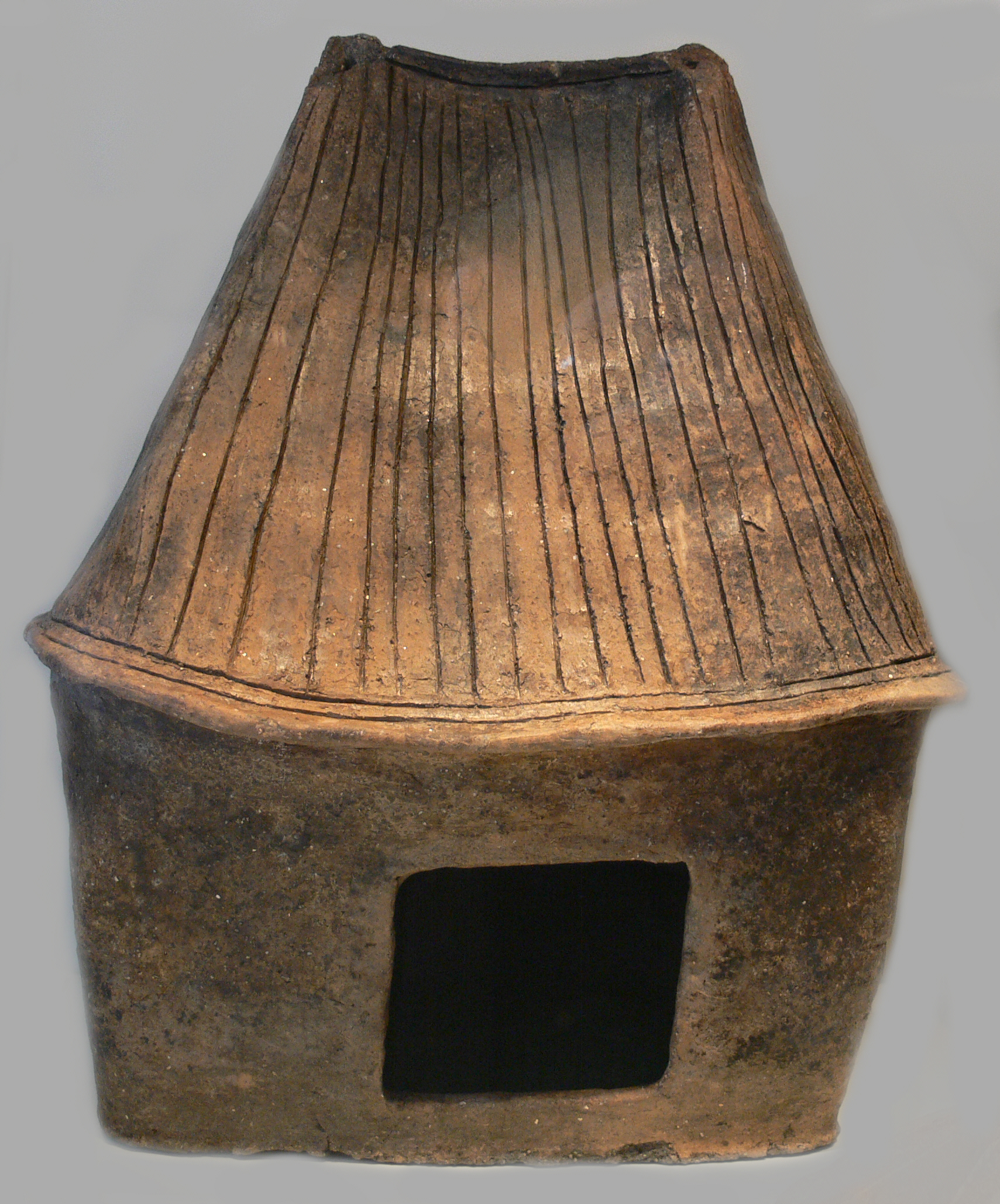
House-shaped urn, 7th century BC, found in Sachsen-Anhalt

The House Urns culture (German: Hausurnenkultur) was an early Iron Age culture of the 7th century BC in central Germany, in the Region between Harz Mountains and the junction of river Saale to river Elbe. It was the western periphery of the bronze and Iron Age Lusatian culture.

Urns in the shape of house models were its characteristical sign. They were set in gravefields that had already been used for centuries, but sometimes in these gravefields they were deposited in stone cists that were an innovation. So it is considered that religious beliefs changed in that time, though the bias was not as great as in the Mediterranean region and in the area of the Hallstatt culture. Archeologists see an obvious connection to the Pomeranian culture of the same age. The relation to the Etruscan Villanovan culture, which had its summit about 1 ½ centuries before, is questioned.

== Literature ==
- Hallstattzeit, Die Altertümer im Museum für Vor- und Frühgeschichte, Bd. 2, 1999, ISBN 3-8053-2566-5
