= Oksywie culture =

Archaeological culture

- Geographical range: Eastern Pomerania
- Period: Iron Age
- Dates: 2nd century BC – early 1st century
- Preceded by: Pomeranian culture
- Followed by: Wielbark culture

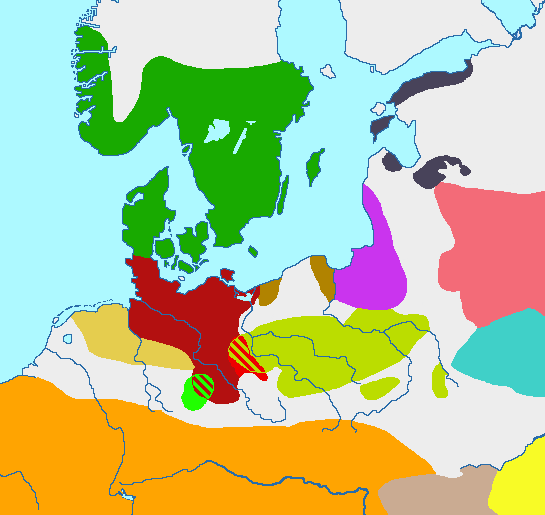
Oksywie culture (brown)

The Oksywie culture (German Oxhöft-Kultur) was an archaeological culture that existed in the area of modern-day Eastern Pomerania around the lower Vistula river from the 2nd century BC to the early 1st century AD. It is named after the village of Oksywie, now part of the city of Gdynia in northern Poland, where the first archaeological finds typical of this culture were discovered.

Archaeological research during the past recent decades near Pomerania in Poland suggests that the transition of the local component of the Pomeranian culture into the Oksywie culture occurred in the 2nd century BC. Like other cultures of this period, Oksywie showed some signs of an influence from the La Tène culture. However, in terms of their ethnolinguistic identity, the time period and geographical location may suggest that the Pomeranian and/or Oksywie cultures were linked to the long-extinct Western Baltic languages and, in particular, the little-known Pomeranian Baltic language.

The Oksywie culture's ceramics and burial customs indicate strong ties with the Przeworsk culture. Men only had their ashes placed in well made black urns with fine finish and a decorative band around. Their graves were supplied with practical items for the afterlife, such as utensils and weapons. Typically buried with the man, this culture would also place swords with one-sided edge, and the graves were often covered or marked by stones. Women's ashes were buried in hollows and supplied with feminine items.

However, connections between the Oksywie culture and the Bastarnae and/or Rugii have also been proposed.

== Gallery ==
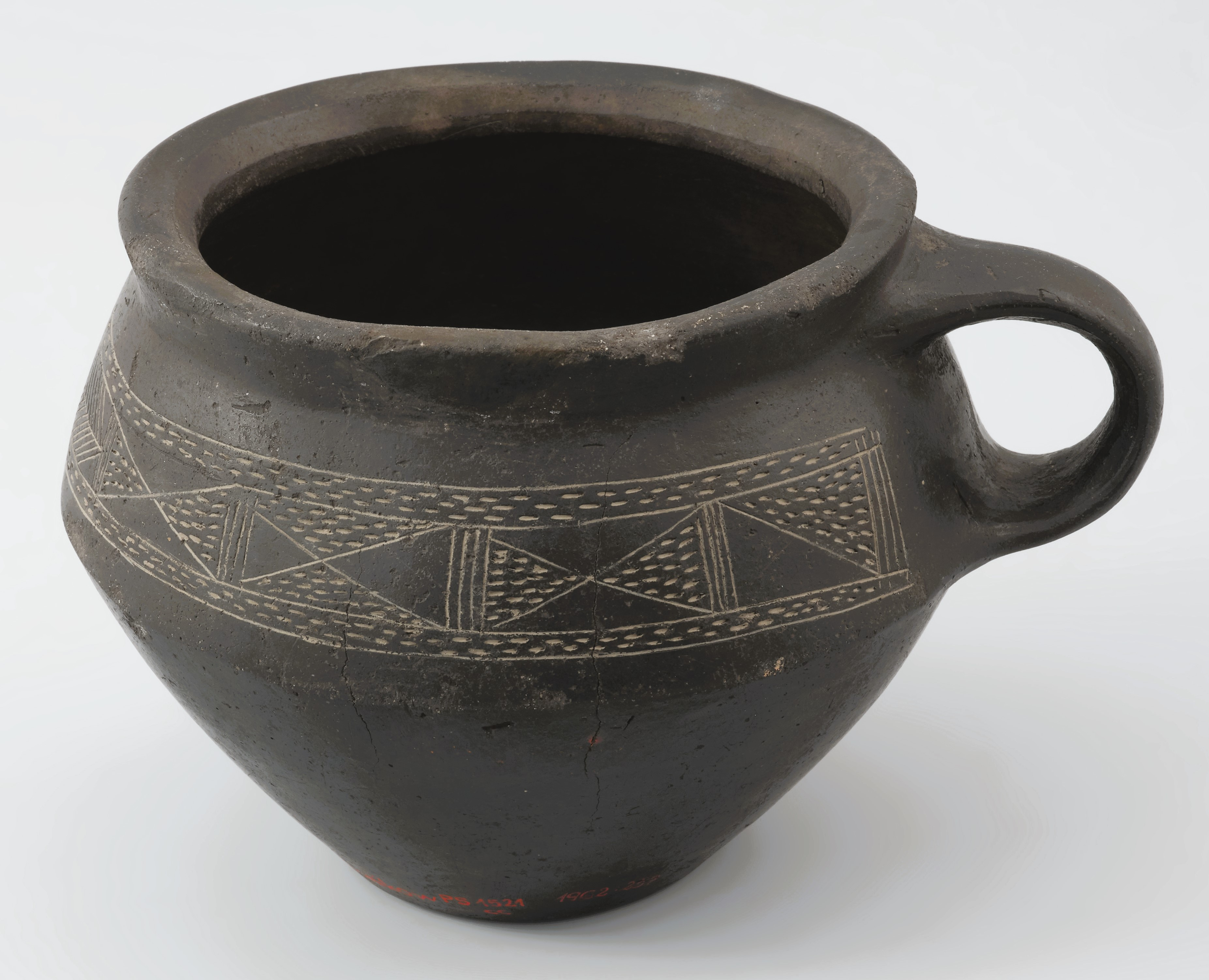

== Sources ==
- Wołągiewicz, Ryszard (1997), "The Pre-Roman Iron Age in Pomerania", Chronological Problems of the Pre-Roman Iron Age in Northern Europe, Arkæologiske skrifter, vol. 7
- (in German) Oxhöftkultur
- (in German) Andrzej Kokowski "Archäologie der Goten" 1999 (ISBN 83-907341-8-4)
- (in German) Marija Gimbutas. "The Bronze and the Early Iron Age of the Eastern Balts"
