= Assebroek =

Sub-municipality of the city of Bruges, Belgium

- Sub-municipality of Bruges
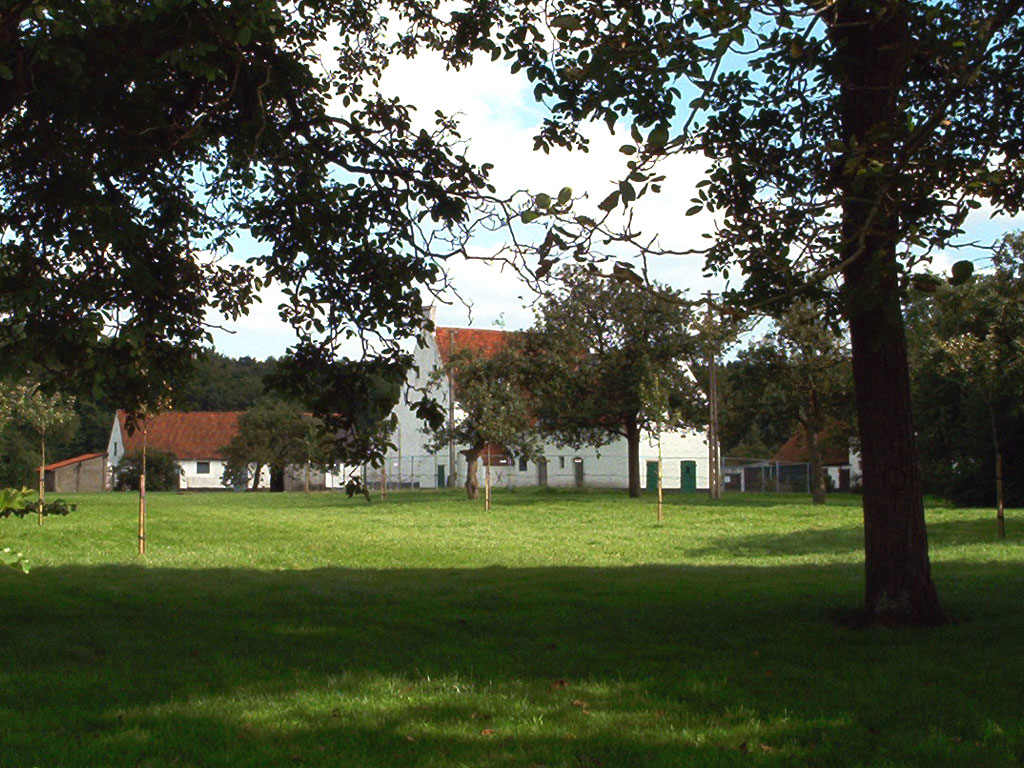
- Abbey farm Saint-Trudo

- Coat of arms

- Location of Assebroek in Bruges
- Interactive map of Assebroek
- Location within Belgium Location within West Flanders
- Coordinates: 51°11′47″N 3°15′13″E
- Country: Belgium
- Community: Flemish Community
- Region: Flemish Region
- Province: West Flanders
- Arrondissement: Bruges
- Municipality: Bruges

Area
  - Total: 10.49 km^{2} (4.05 sq mi)

Population (2014-12-31)
  - Total: 19,737
  - Density: 1,882/km^{2} (4,873/sq mi)
- Postal codes: 8310
- Area codes: 050

Assebroek (Dutch pronunciation: [ˈɑsəbruk]) is a sub-municipality of the city of Bruges located in the province of West Flanders, Flemish Region, Belgium. It was a separate municipality until 1971. On 1 January 1971, it was merged into Bruges. On 31 December 2014, Assebroek had 19,737 inhabitants. Since 1999, this number has hardly changed. Assebroek is home to 16.75% of Bruges’ population.

== History ==
Through artifacts retrieved near Saint-Lucas hospital (and stored at Gruuthusemuseum in Bruges) we assume that the Leitje region was already inhabited in the Stone Age.

Aerial views of the Ver-Assebroekse meersen reveals an approximately 300 m-wide ring of ditches and rampart complex dating from the 5th century where the lords of Assebroek later built their castle.

Apparently around the 12th century, a lord called Boudewijn of Assebroek bought his domain – limited by Oostkamp, Oedelem, Michel van Hamme street, Astridlaan and Lorreinendreef - free from Sijsele.

The Assebroek municipality only consisted of some scattered maisonnettes and a mill along the old road to Bruges. Instigated by the lords of Assebroek, a local church and Engelendale convent were established.

Nowadays Assebroek includes 6 parishes: Immaculata (Ver-Assebroek), Assumpta, Saint Lutgardis, Saint Catharina, Saint Christopher, and Sacred Heart (Steenbrugge).

== Etymology ==
Before the 20th century, the town's name was recorded as Ars(e)brouc, later becoming Assebroek.

Ars(e)brouc probably meant wetland with horses, the medieval Dutch Arse or Ors being horses and brouc meaning marsh. In medieval times, the Meersen area had several inns, all named after horses, with only the ruin of The Flying Horse in Oedelem still standing. Some sources claim Arse stands for ashes so that Assebroek would mean marsh surrounded by ashes.

== Geography ==
Assebroek is situated on a lower sand plain south west of Bruges. Forming a typical polder landscape, in winter an area called Assebroekse Meersen, characterised by small grass fields separated by willow trees often gets flooded.

The Meersen area arose as prolongation within the so-called Flemish Valley. The slope contains sand, lime and peat deposits from the Holocene Epoch. Underneath the peat remains an approx. 30 cm marsh lime layer from the early Holocene. 10,000 years ago, this region was a real marsh.

== Evolution of the number of inhabitants ==
=== 19th century ===
Census results of December 31

Year	1806	1816	1830	1846	1856	1866	1876	1880	1890
Number of inhabitants	543	614	845	1,186	1,171	1,259	1,493	1,599	1,915

=== 20th century till rearrangement of municipalities ===
Census results of December 31

Year	1900	1910	1920	1930	1947	1961	1970
Number of inhabitants	2,733	4,705	5,456	6,936	11,337	14,422	15,572

== Attractions ==
- Local church of Ver-Assebroek with organ (Pastoor Verhaegheplein)
- Reserve 4.2 km^{2} "Assebroekse Meersen" with concentric rings (Kerkdreef)
- 19th century village centre (Generaal Lemanlaan)
- Cemetery of Bruges – a.o. tomb of Guido Gezelle (Kerkhofblommenstraat)
- Bergjesbos (Olmendreef)
- Former inn "The Lily" (Weidestraat)
- Children's farm "The Seven Towers" (Canadaring) (NL = Zeven Torentjes)
- Old barn "Het Leenhof" (Kerklaan)
- Convent domain "Engelendale" (Astridlaan)
- Abbey farm "Saint-Trudo" (Sint-Trudostraat)
- Reserve 400,000 m^{2} "Gemene Weidebeek" (Gemene Weideweg)
- Kasteel Zevecote (Bossuytlaan)

== Assebroek - a sacred place ==
Each year thousands of pilgrims honour the miraculous figurine of The Madonna at Ver-Assebroek and pray with the Benedictine monks of Steenbrugge. According to the legend (represented by the stained-glass windows in the church) this marble figurine floated when the Geuzen threw it into the sea.

== Assebroek beer community ==
In medieval times, the inner city of Bruges imposed significant taxes on beer consumption. Hence so called outside drinkers found their way to Assebroek's inns till the early morning when Bruges’ city gates were opened.

Many beers are named after this place (Steenbrugge Blonde, Steenbrugge Double Brown, Steenbrugge Triple and Steenbrugge White) or were locally brewed by the Regenboog Brewery (now moved to Mater).

== Gallery ==
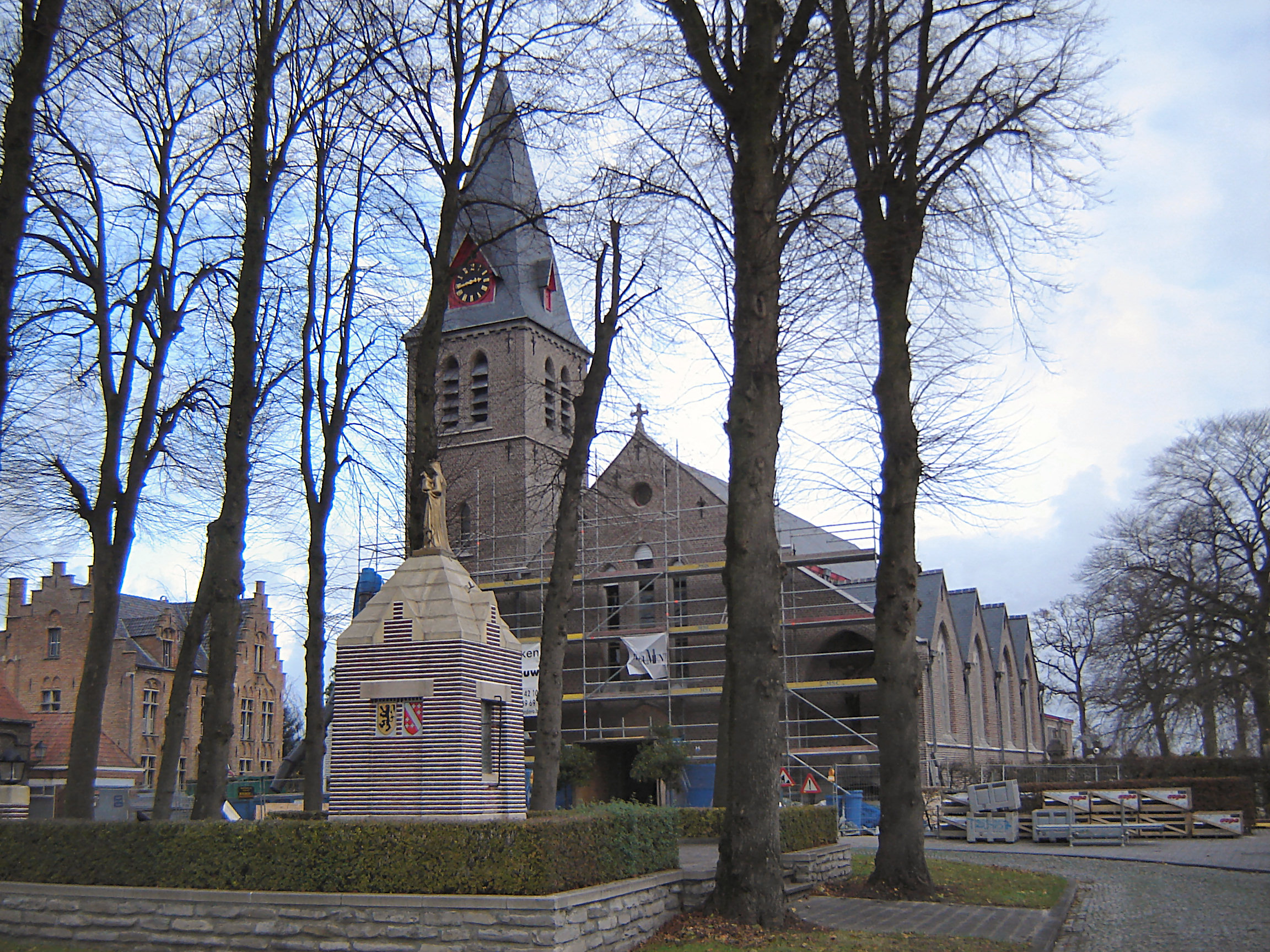
O.-L.-V.-Onbevlekt- Ontvangenkerk

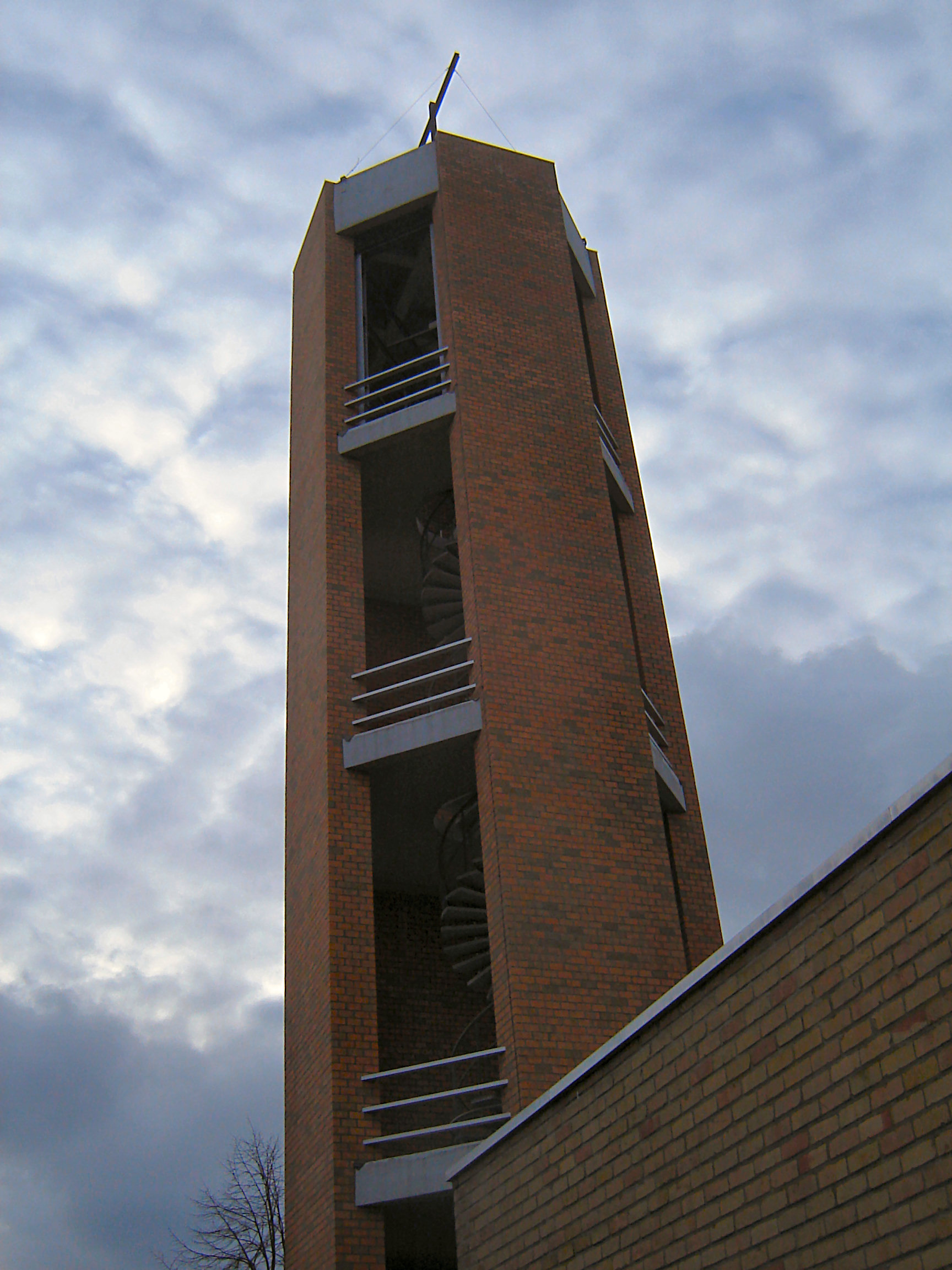
O.-L.-V.-ten-Hemel- Opgenomenkerk

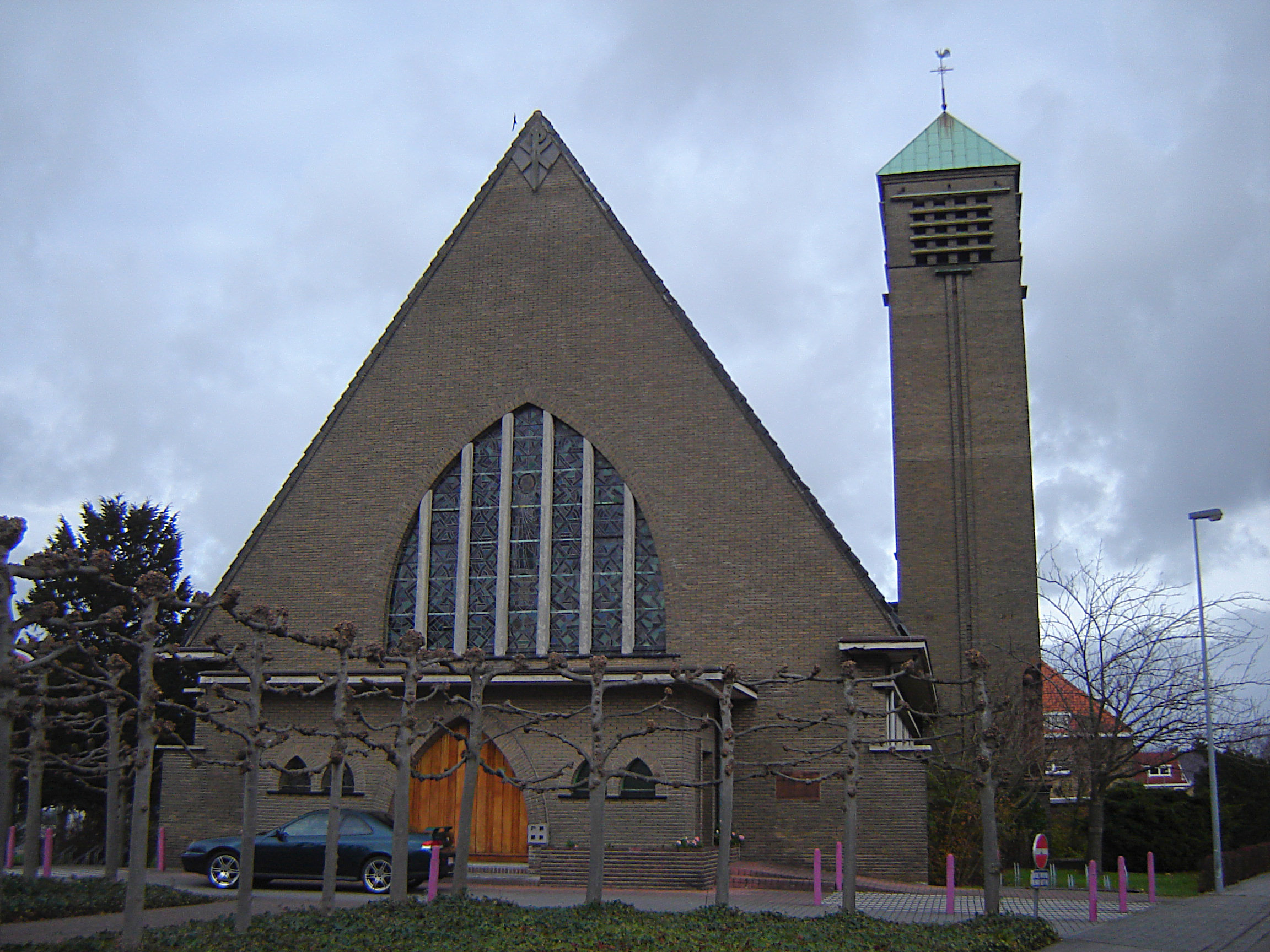
Sint-Jozef en Sint-Christoffelkerk

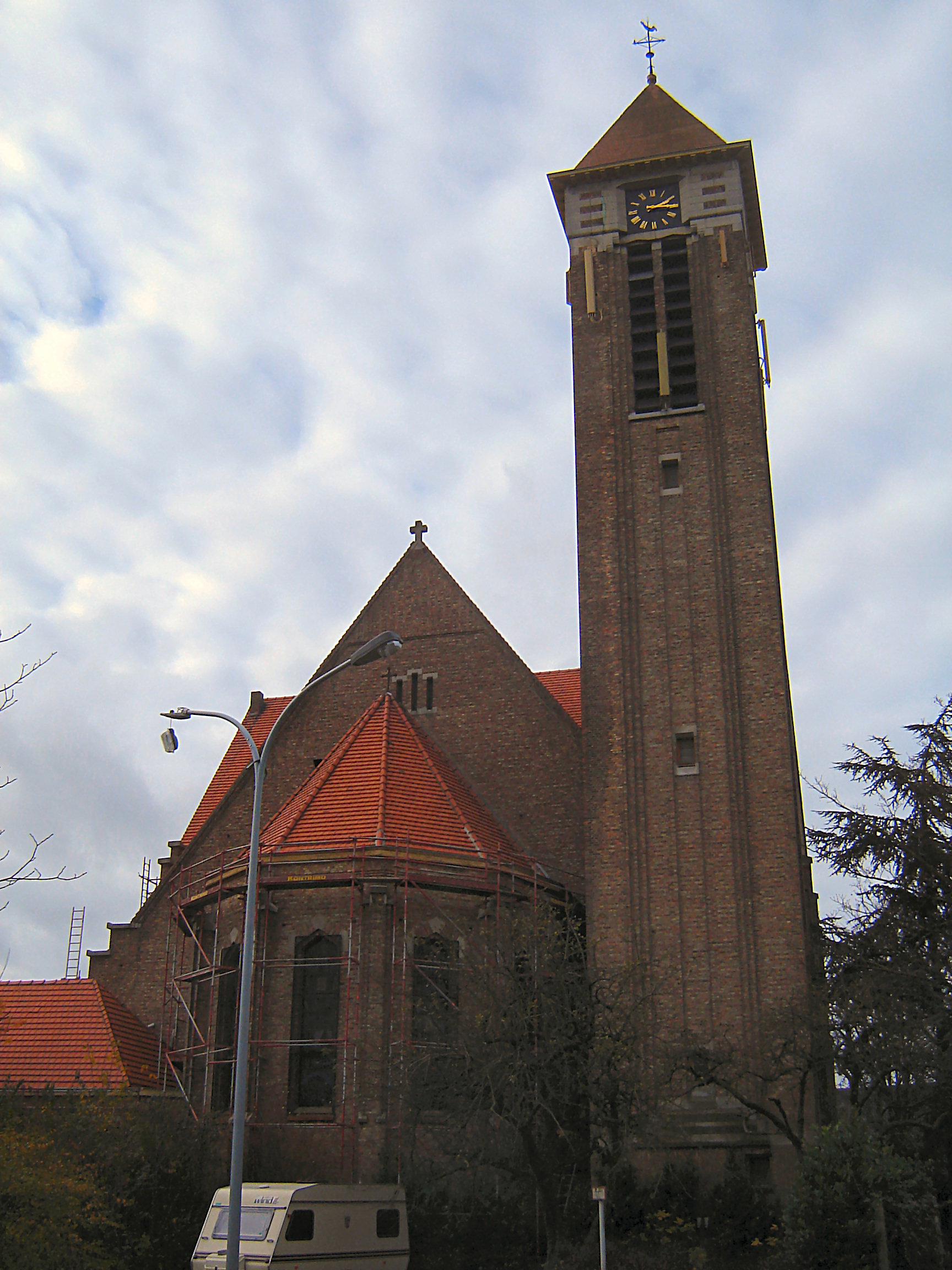
Sint-Katharinakerk

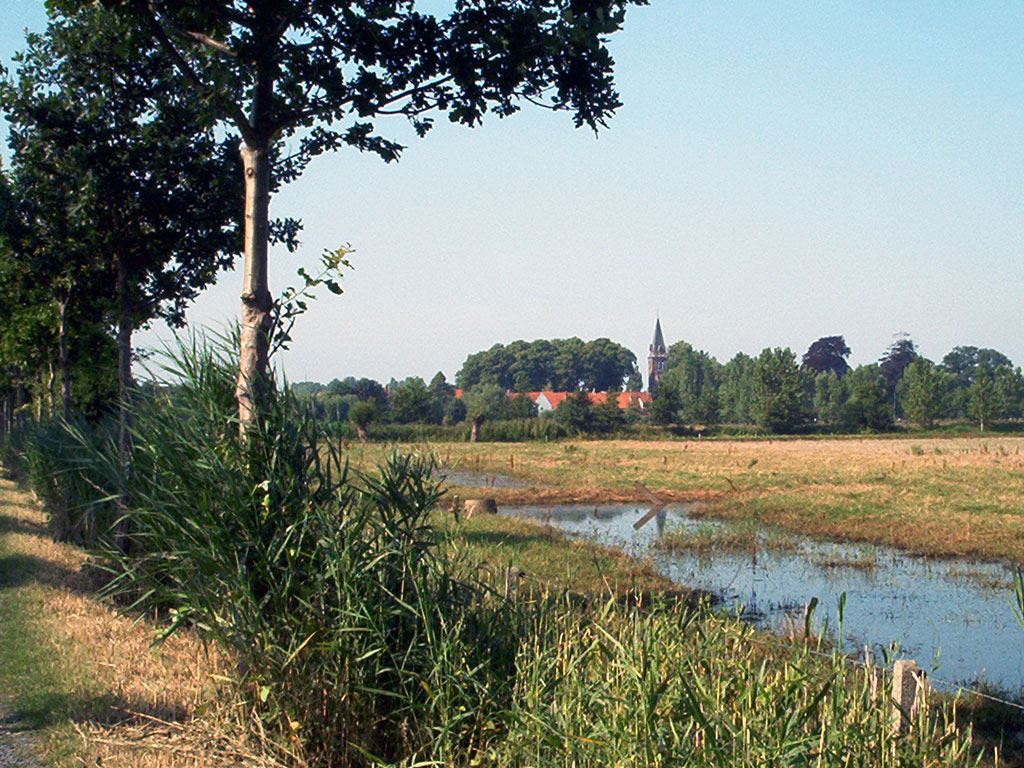
Assebroekse Meersen with in the background the church of Ver-Assebroek

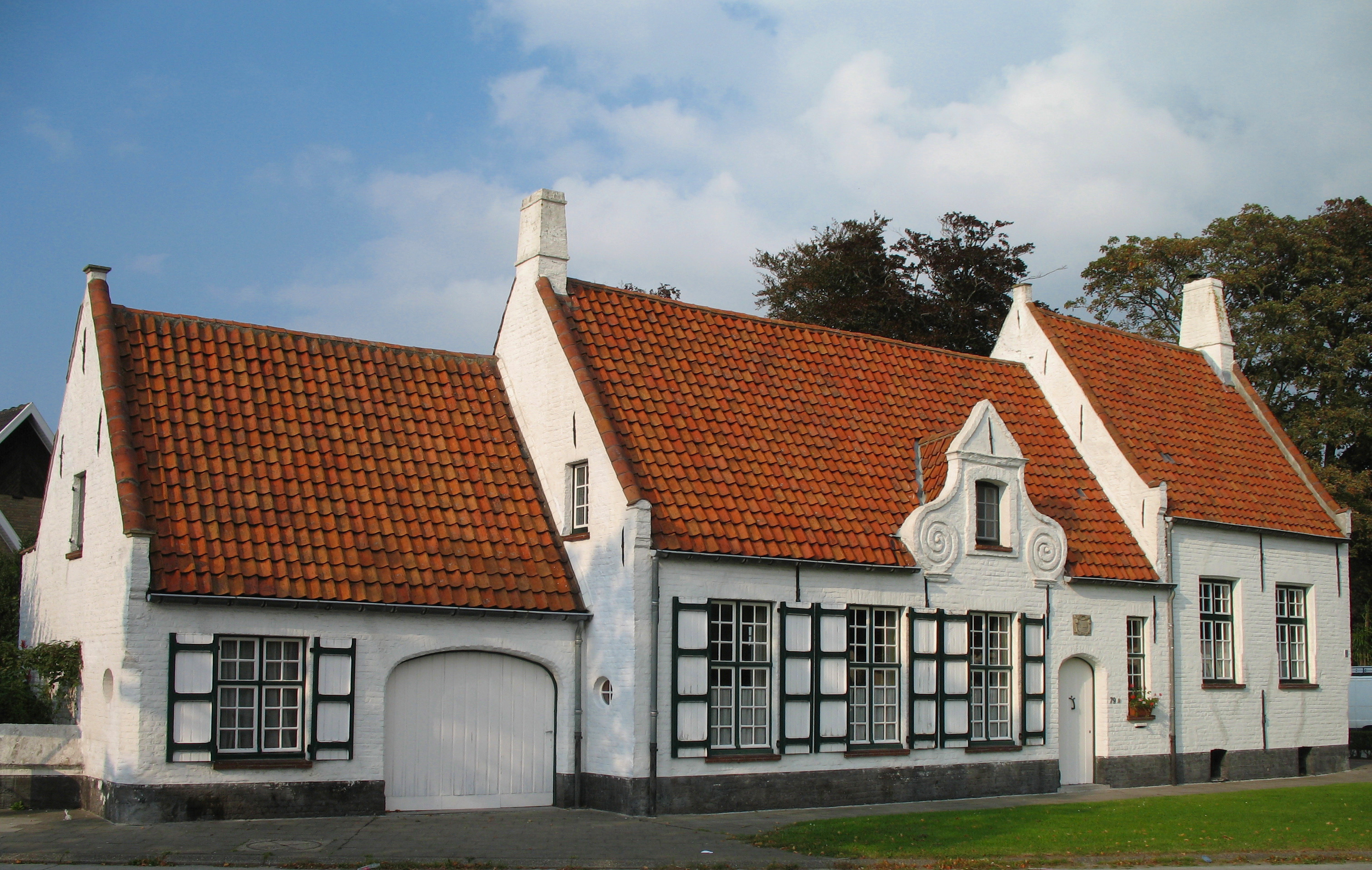
Former inn De Lelie (17th century)

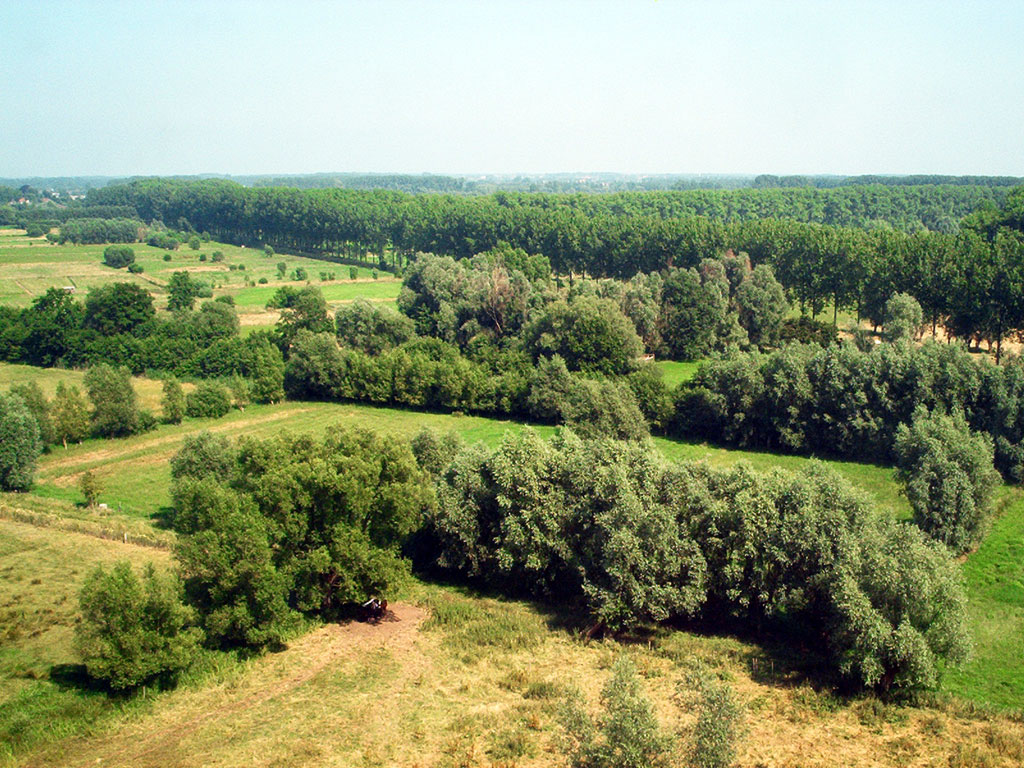
The Assebroekse Meersen

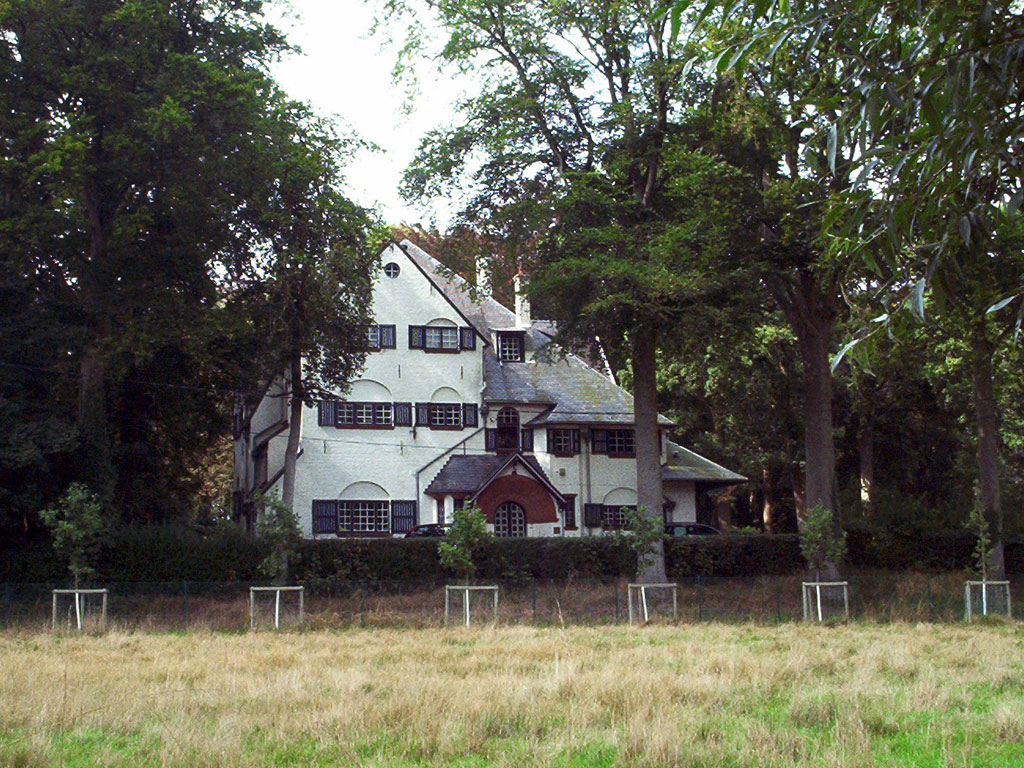
The Bergjesbos castle

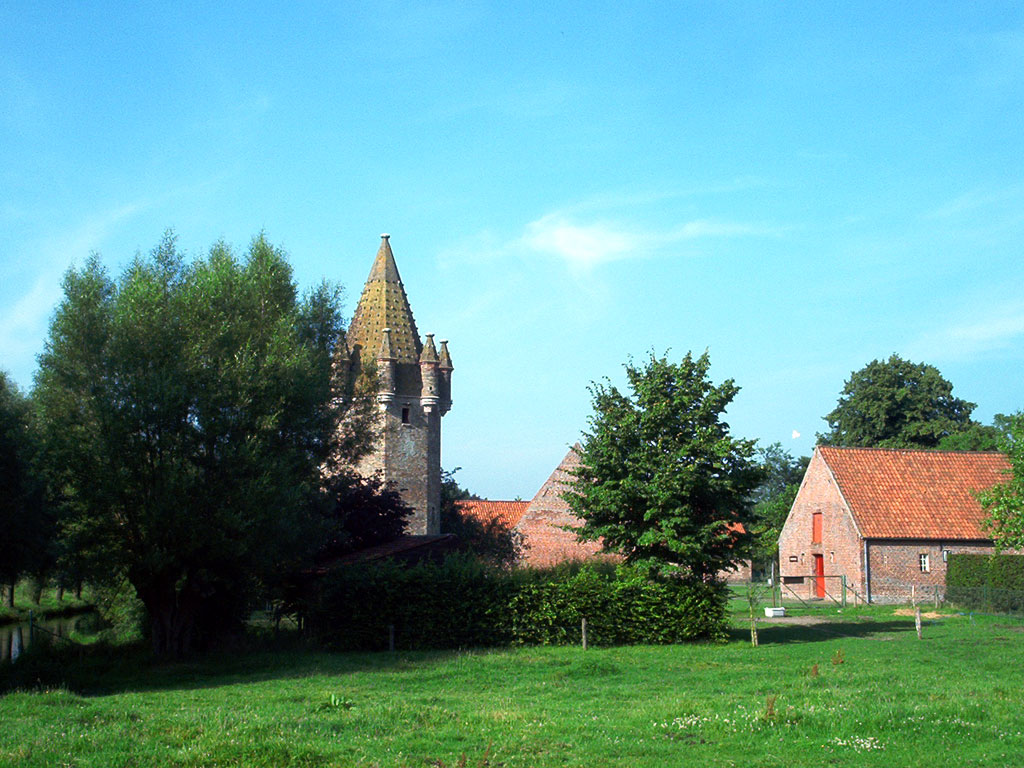
The Seven Towers (NL = Zeven Torentjes)

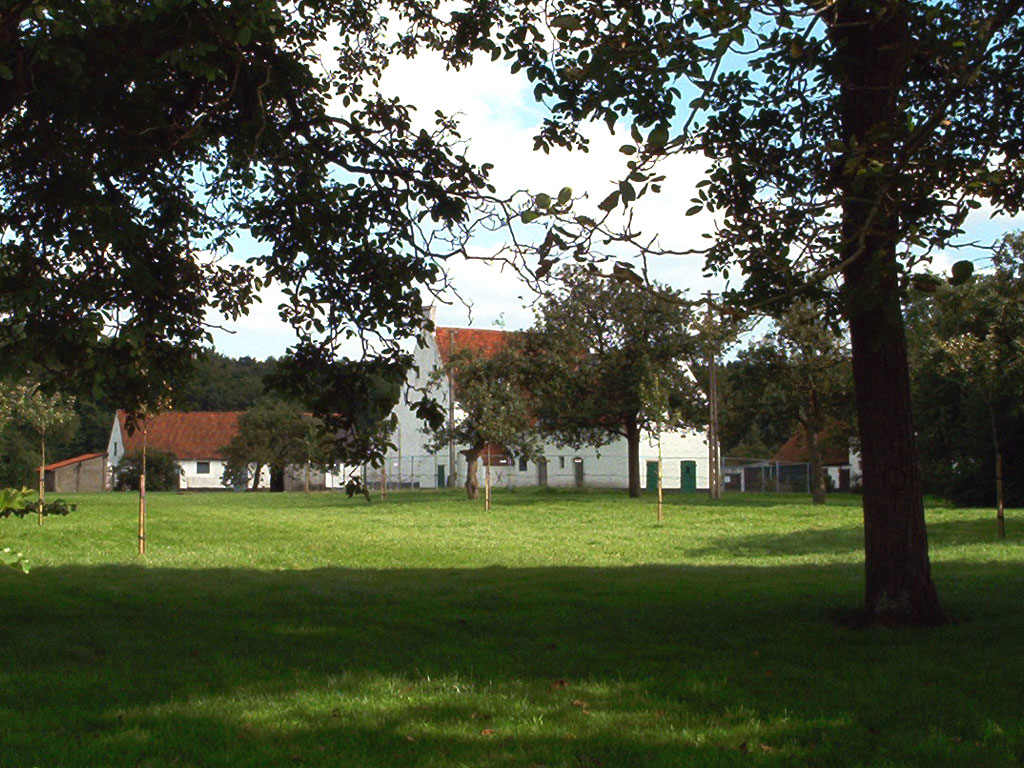
Abbey farm Saint-Trudo

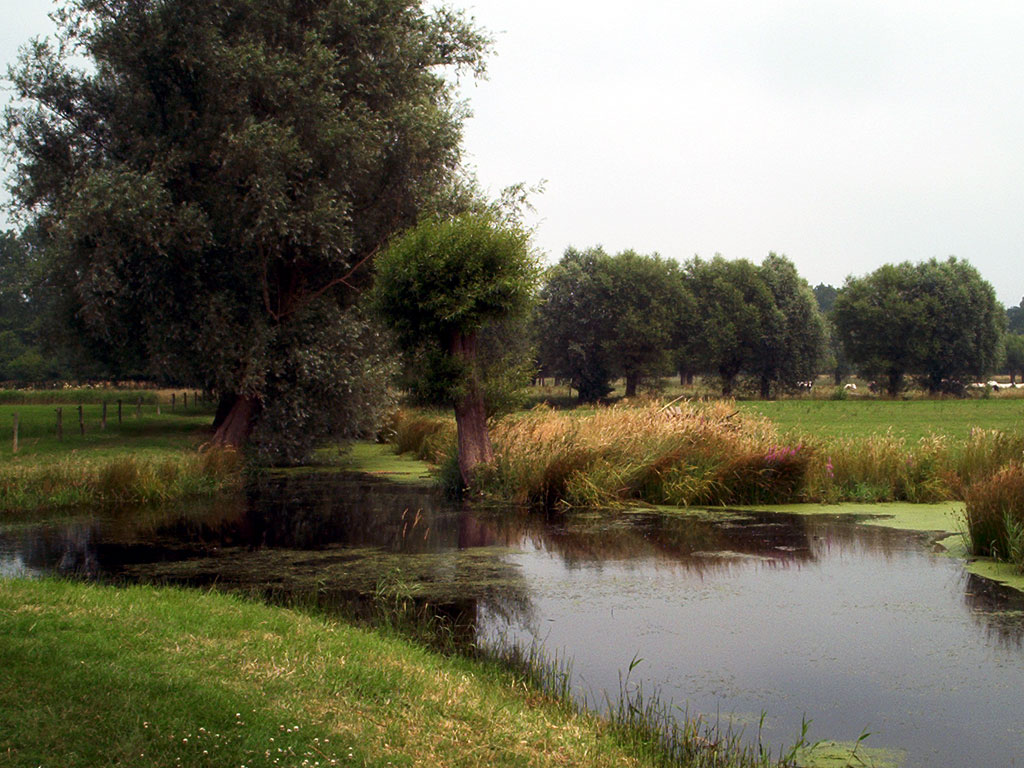
Gemene Weidebeek

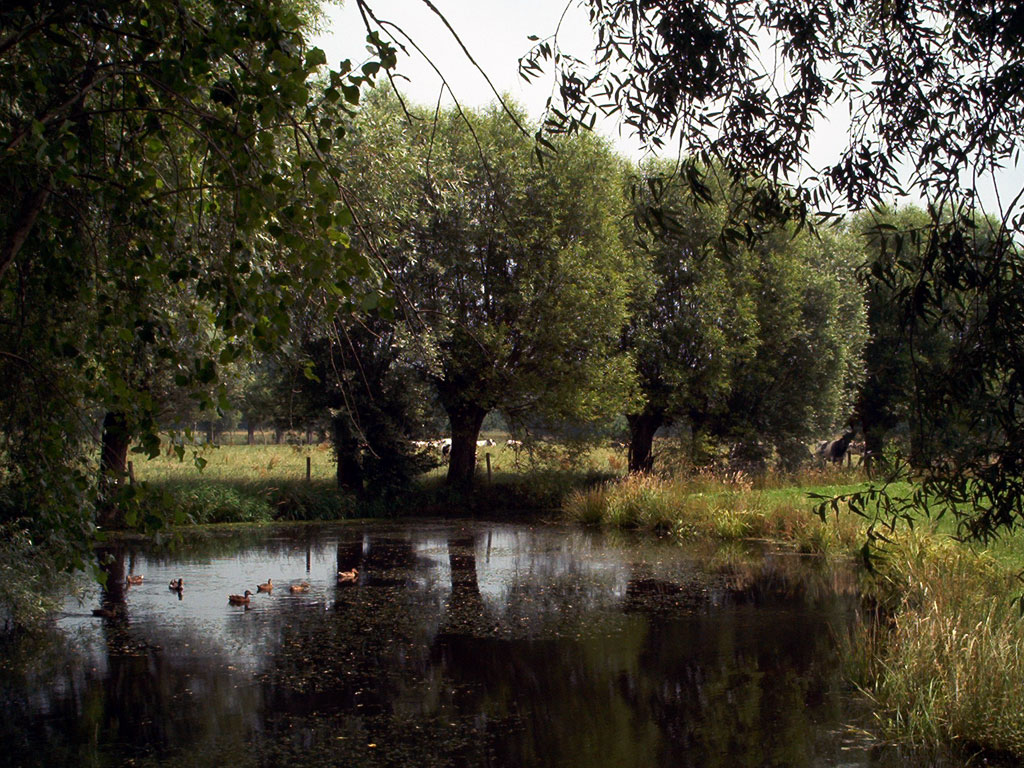
Gemene Weidebeek
