= Rhinos Rugby Oudenaarde =

- Nickname: Rhinos
- Founded: 1999
- Location: Oudenaarde, Belgium
- Ground: Aalststraat
- Chairman: Bruno Cruyt; Emilie Nachtergaele
- Coach: Dries Michiels
- League: Belgian Second Division
- 2021-2022: 10th
Team kit

Rhinos Rugby Oudenaarde is a Belgian rugby club in Oudenaarde.

== History ==
The club was founded in 2002 by former club chairman Thomas Bergé. In 2016 the general assembly appointed Bruno Cruyt and Emilie Nachtergaele as new chairmen. Currently, Rhinos Rugby Oudenaarde counts over 200 members. On 10 December 2016 the general assembly gave their approval to the board to invest in a new clubhouse and two sport fields next to the Liefmans Brewery in the center of Oudenaarde. In 2018 Rhinos Rugby was voted the coolest sports club in Flanders.

== Season by Season ==
Season	Tier	Division	League Pos.	Notes
2011–12	4	Flanders Regional Division 1	1	Promotion to National league
2012–13	3	Belgian Third Division	3	
2013–14	3	Belgian Third Division	1	Promotion to second division
2014–15	2	Belgian Second Division	7	
2015–16	2	Belgian Second Division	5	
2016–17	2	Belgian Second Division	3	
2017–18	2	Belgian Second Division	3	
2018–19	2	Belgian Second Division	1	Promotion to first division
