= Bevere =

Bevere may refer to:

- Bevere, Belgium, a town near Oudenaarde, Belgium
- Bevere, Worcestershire, a hamlet in Worcestershire, England
