= Hendrik Cornelis =

Belgian colonial civil servant

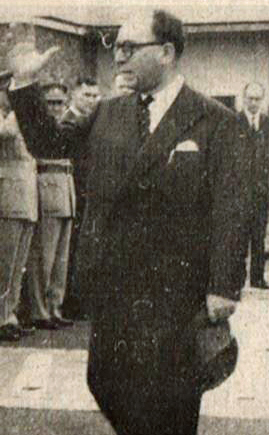
- Governor-General Cornelis shortly before leaving the Congo

Governor-General of the Belgian Congo
- In office 12 July 1958 – 30 June 1960
- Monarch: Baudouin
- Preceded by: Léo Pétillon
- Succeeded by: None (post abolished)

Personal details
- Born: Henri Arthur Adolf Marie Christopher Cornelis; 18 September 1910 Bevere, East Flanders, Belgium
- Died: 1999 (aged 88 or 89) Chaumont-Gistoux, Wallonia, Belgium
- Education: University of Ghent

Hendrik "Rik" Cornelis (September 18, 1910–1999) was a Belgian colonial civil servant who served as the final Governor-General of the Belgian Congo from 1958 to 1960. His term ended with the independence of the Republic of the Congo.

Cornelis was born in Bevere, near Oudenaarde, in the Belgian province of East Flanders on 18 September 1910. He gained a doctorate in economic science from the University of Ghent, also spending a year at the Graduate Institute of International and Development Studies in Geneva. He joined the Belgian colonial administration in Ruanda-Urundi in 1934 and later served in various roles in the Congo. He was promoted to vice-governor-general of the Belgian Congo in 1953. He became the governor-general on 12 July 1958, being the first Dutch-speaking appointee to the role.

After the independence of the Belgian Congo in 1960, Cornelis served as an advisor to Justin Bomboko during his presidency of the College of Commissioners established by Joseph-Désiré Mobutu.
