= Smisje Brewery =

Brewery in Belgium

Brouwerij Smisje
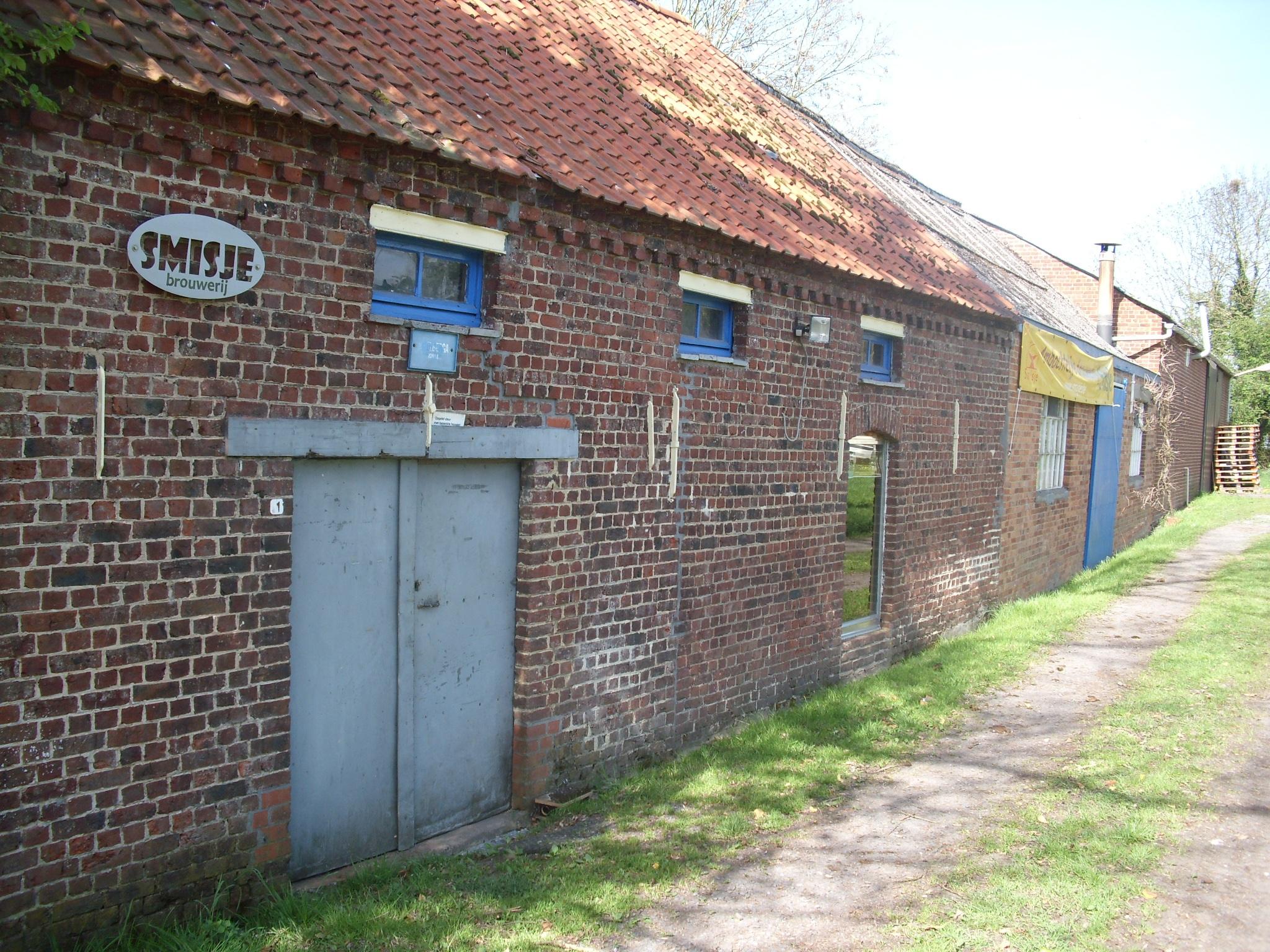
- Industry: Alcoholic beverage
- Founded: 1995
- Founder: Johan Brandt
- Headquarters: Driesleutelstraat 1, Mater, Oudenaarde, Belgium
- Products: Beer
- Production output: 200 hL
- Website: www.smisje.belgianbeerboard.com

The Smisje Brewery (Brouwerij Smisje in Dutch), with a tiny production of only 200 hectoliters per year, is one of the smallest existing Belgian craft breweries. Begun in 1995 by former printer and homebrewer Johan Brandt, it was originally titled "De Regenboog" (The Rainbow), the same name as his earlier printing business. Brandt is also a bee-keeper, which accounts for the prominent use of honey in some of the brewery's offerings, including its first commercial beer, which was named 't Smisje or "the little blacksmith" to reflect the hand-crafted nature of the product as well as a local landmark blacksmith's house near the brewery's original location.

From 1995-2008, the brewery was located in the West Flanders municipality of Assebroek, a suburb of Bruges. In 2008 it relocated to the village of Mater in Oudenaarde, East Flanders and changed its name to simply "Smisje". Smisje is known for beers in both traditional Belgian styles and others, but particularly for brewing with distinctive ingredients and flavorings, often fruits or herbs. This experimental brewery exports roughly half of its annual product outside Belgium to countries such as the United States, the Netherlands, Italy, Spain and Denmark. Despite its minuscule size, for many years Smisje has kept six beers in regular production in addition to a large variety of seasonal and occasional brews. Many of their beers have featured label art by Brooklyn cartoonist and craft beer enthusiast Bill Coleman.

In 2010, the brewery announced that it would be discontinuing all of its historic products in order to focus on a new blond, hoppy ale to be called "Smiske". Only the annual "Smisje Christmas" would be preserved. Following the example of Duvel Moortgat, who offered to brew again their limited-edition "Duvel Triple Hop" if 10,000 people would sign a petition for it, Brandt announced that if 20,000 people would join a Facebook group supporting it, he would offer to brew one additional historic recipe per year.

== Technical ==
Brandt began brewing in 1995 with a jury-rigged system capable of producing only 250 liters per batch, and slowly expanded the equipment over time in the original Bruges location. The new premises in Mater utilize the second-hand equipment of the now-defunct De Teut brewery of Neerpelt. The brewer maintains his own distinctive house yeast strain and utilizes primarily native Belgian hops. In addition to various spices and non-traditional ingredients such as sloe berries, Smisje is known to utilize the traditional Belgian method of using a significant amount of candi sugar in their recipes to lighten the body of stronger brews.

== Beers ==
Beers formerly in regular production:

- 't Smisje Blond - 6% ABV: A moderately strong golden-colored ale flavored with linden blossoms.
- 't Smisje Dubbel - 9% ABV: A strong brown ale in the Belgian Abbey Dubbel style which uses fresh dates in the recipe.
- 't Smisje Tripel - 9% ABV: A beer in the Belgian Abbey Tripel style.
- 't Smisje Wostyntje - 7% ABV: A strong golden ale flavored with mustard seeds from the nearby village of Tourhout.
- Vuuve - 5% ABV: A cloudy wheat beer in the Belgian Witbier style, brewed with coriander and bitter orange peel. Vuuve is the Flemish word for the number five, a reference to the beer's alcohol content.

Seasonal or limited-run beers (past and present):

- 't Smisje + Dubbel IPA - 10% ABV
- 't Smisje BBBourgondier - 12% ABV: A dark strong specialty beer flavored with valerian root and lemon balm. Malty with raisin and caramel notes.
- 't Smisje Calva Reserva - 12% ABV: A strong ale matured for six months in Calvados barrels.
- 't Smisje Catherine The Great Imperial Stout - 10% ABV
- 't Smisje Cuvee 2005 - 10% ABV: A beer inspired by American microbrews, using Challenger, Cascade, Magnum and Newport hops, and further dry-hopped with Cascade.
- 't Smisje Fiori - 7% ABV
- 't Smisje Grande Reserva - 11% ABV
- 't Smisje Great Reserva - 10% ABV
- 't Smisje Guido - 8% ABV: A brown ale brewed with honey and raisins in commemoration of Guido Gezelle, a poet that wrote in the West Flemish dialect, Roman Catholic priest and native of Bruges.
- 't Smisje Halloween - 10.5%
- 't Smisje Honingbier - 6% ABV: A golden ale brewed with honey.
- 't Smisje Honingbier Bruin - 6% ABV: A brown ale brewed with honey.
- 't Smisje Kerst - 11% ABV: A seasonal Christmas offering.
- 't Smisje Meso - 2.5% ABV: A low-alcohol beer.
- 't Smisje Sleedoornbier - 6% ABV: A beer flavored with sloe berries (literally "sleigh-thorns").
- 't Smisje Sleedoorn Extra - 7% ABV: A stronger version of the Sleedornbier
- 't Smisje Speciale - 10.5% ABV
- 't Zwarte Gat Bier - 6%
- Terracotta - 7%
- Brugs Beertje 20 - 6.5% ABV: Brewed to celebrate the 20th anniversary of celebrated local craft beer pub the "Brugs Beertje" (lit. "Little Bear of Bruges", a reference to the animal on the town's coat of arms, but also a pun on the similar-sounding "Biertje" or little beer)
- Brugs Beertje 25 - 9% ABV: Brewed for the 25th anniversary of the "Brugs Beertje".
- De Regenboog IJzer - 6%
- De Regenboog Naamloos - 6%
- Lombardus - 7%
- Pandreitje - 7%
- Pierewietje - 6%
- Snuffelbeer - 7%
