= Het Anker Brewery =

Brewery in Mechelen, Belgium

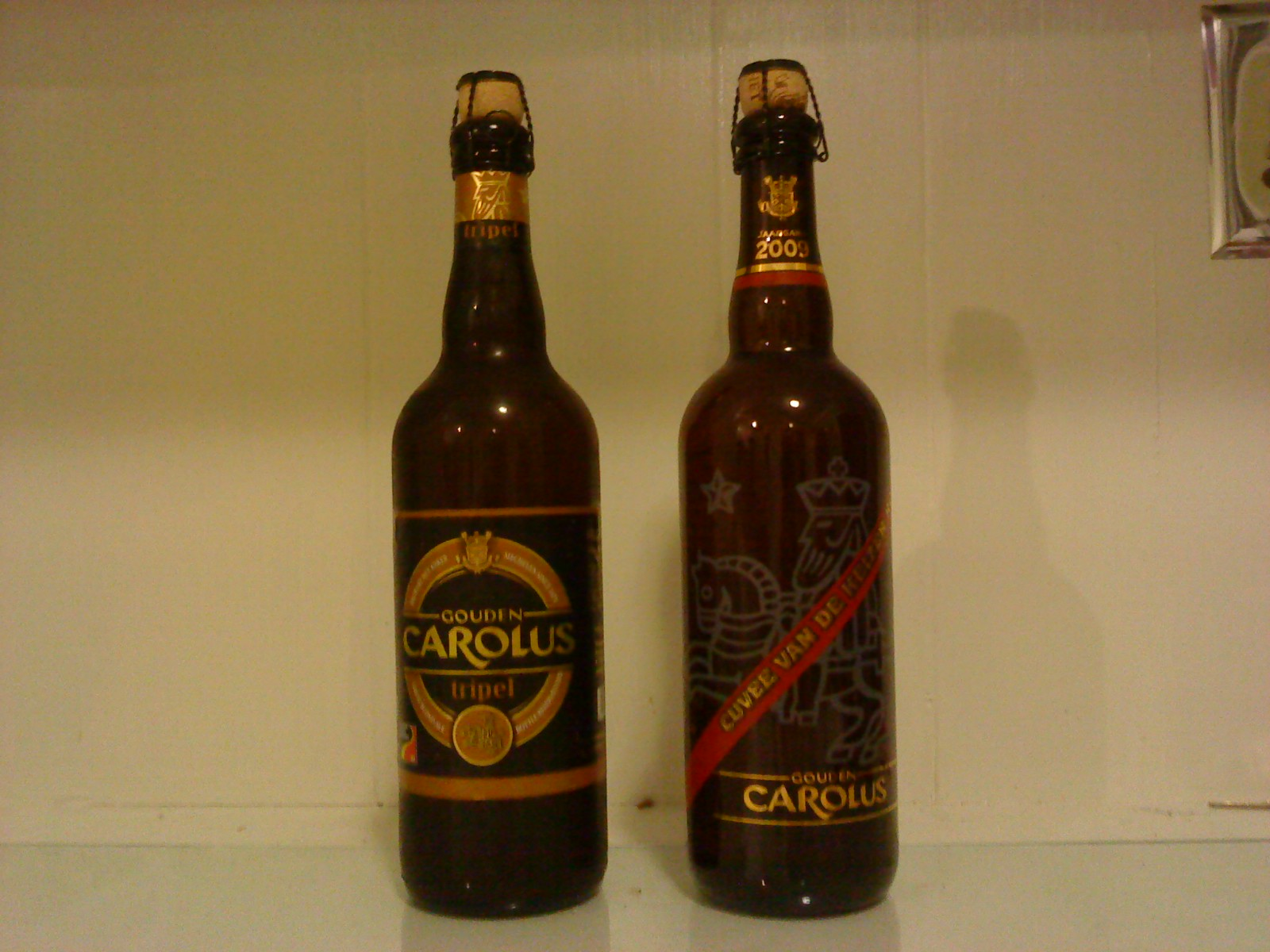
Gouden Carolus Tripel and Cuvée van de Keizer Imperial Blond (2009).

Het Anker Brewery is a Flemish brewery in Mechelen, founded in 1471 by a community of Beguines. In 1872, the brewery was acquired by Louis Van Breedam, who renamed it Het Anker ("The Anchor") in 1904. Expanding its assortment from lager to ale, it began producing "Emperor beer" after World War II. In 1960, they renamed it "Gouden Carolus" (Golden Charles) after Charles V, Holy Roman Emperor (who was raised in Mechelen). They opened a brasserie and a hotel, and in 2010 began producing a single malt whisky, distilled from the Gouden Carolus Tripel.

The company's Lucifer beer (which was originally brewed by Liefmans Brewery and then acquired by Duvel Moortgat Brewery) was ranked #6 in a 2010 New York Times test of Belgian-style beers. Het Anker is also brewing Dentergems Wit, a wheat beer brewed earlier by Liefmans.

Specialty beers include the Cuvée van de Keizer, brewed once a year on the birthday of Charles V, available as a strong pale ale (red) and a dark ale ("blue").

== Distillery De Molenberg ==
In 2010, a full-fledged whisky distillery was built and put into operation in Blaasveld, in the 17-century family farm. From the mash of Gouden Carolus Tripel, a grain whisky was distilled. Gouden Carolus Single Malt was introduced on November 23, 2013, and has already won several international prizes.
