= Bevere, Belgium =

Bevere
- Village
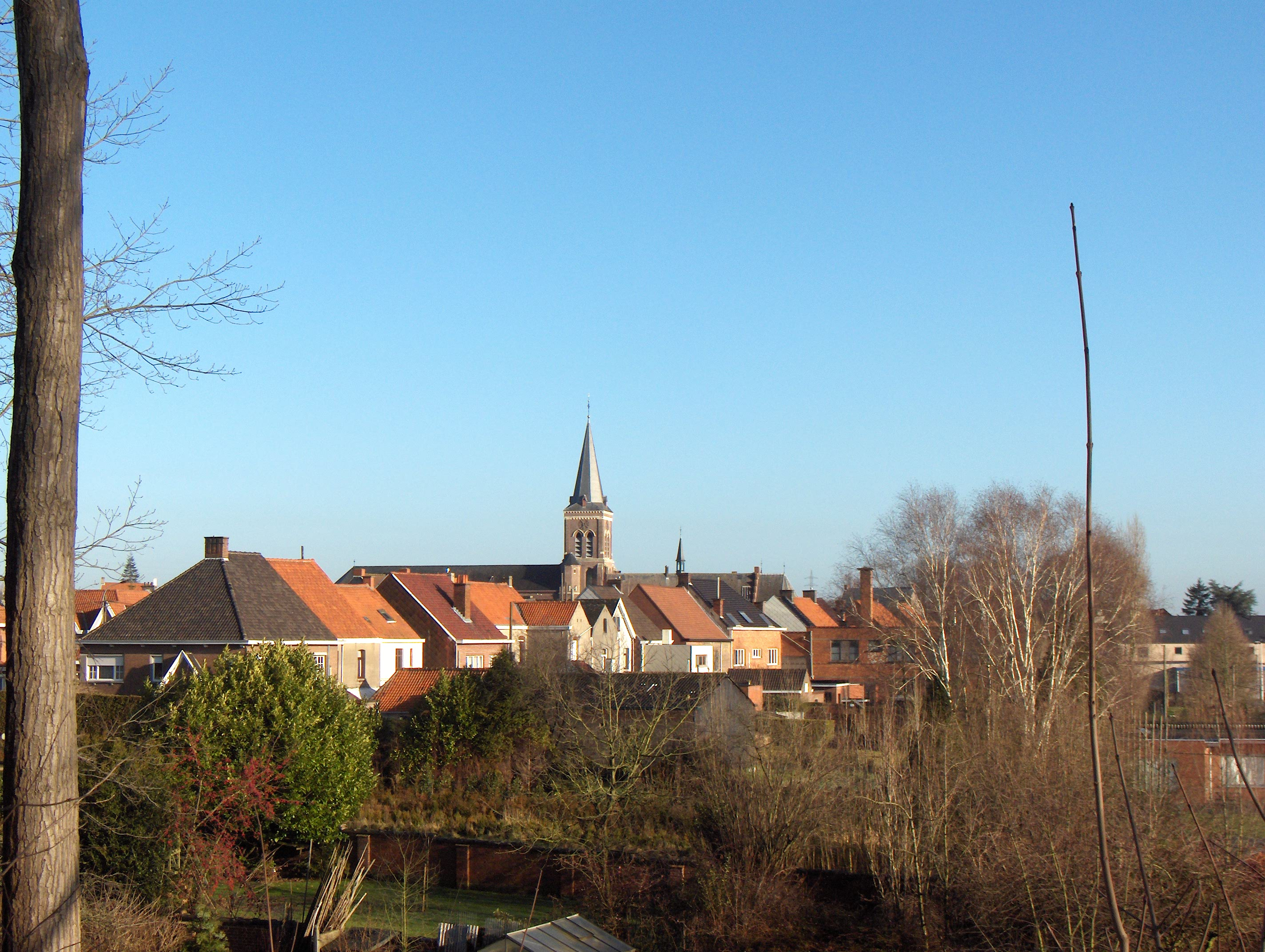
- View on Bevere

- Location in Belgium
- Coordinates: 50.8513°N 3.5943°E
- Country: Belgium
- Region: Flemish Region
- Province: East Flanders
- Municipality: Oudenaarde

Area
  - Total: 6.31 km^{2} (2.44 sq mi)

Population (2021)
  - Total: 3,787
  - Density: 600/km^{2} (1,550/sq mi)
- Time zone: CET

Bevere is a village in the municipality of Oudenaarde. It is located in the Flemish Ardennes, the hilly southern part of the province of East Flanders, Belgium. In the mid-19th century, it started to form a single urban area with Oudenaarde, but retained some rural parts.

== History ==
Bevere is situated on the left bank of the Scheldt. The village used to be surrounded by areas which were flooded annually. Settlements from the Early Bronze Age and the Roman era have been discovered near Bevere. The village was first mentioned in 966 as Buerna, and probably means "brook with beavers". The village was an independent heerlijkheid.

Bevere was frequently damaged by war due to its location near the city walls of Oudenaarde. In 1579, the church and many houses were demolished for an extension of the city's fortification. In 1708, the Battle of Oudenarde was partially fought in Bevere.

In 1845, plans were made for the construction of railway lines. At the time, the fortification of Ouenaarde were considered important, and it was decided to build the station in Bevere. In 1856, Oudenaarde railway station was constructed. The railway lines, and the demolition of the city walls in 1859, resulted in Bevere forming a single urban area with its neighbouring city.

Bevere was an independent municipality until 1965, when it was merged into Oudenaarde.

== Buildings and sights ==
The Vierschaar is a protected monument which served as an open air court of law in the Middle Ages. Jurisdiction originally rested with the Count and Lords, but during the Middle Ages it shifted to the schout and schepenen who held an open air court underneath a tilia tree. Four ropes which laid out, and inside the ropes the trial took place. The original bench for the judges is still present in the field.

The St Peter Church is a three aisled basilica-like church. The foundations of the church are from the Early Middle Ages. The current church was built between 1872 and 1876 in Gothic Revival style. Unlike most churches it is oriented to the south-east. The church was severely damaged in November 1918, and restored between 1921 and 1923.

== Notable inhabitants ==
- Hendrik Cornelis (1910–1999), last Governor-General of the Belgian Congo

== Gallery ==
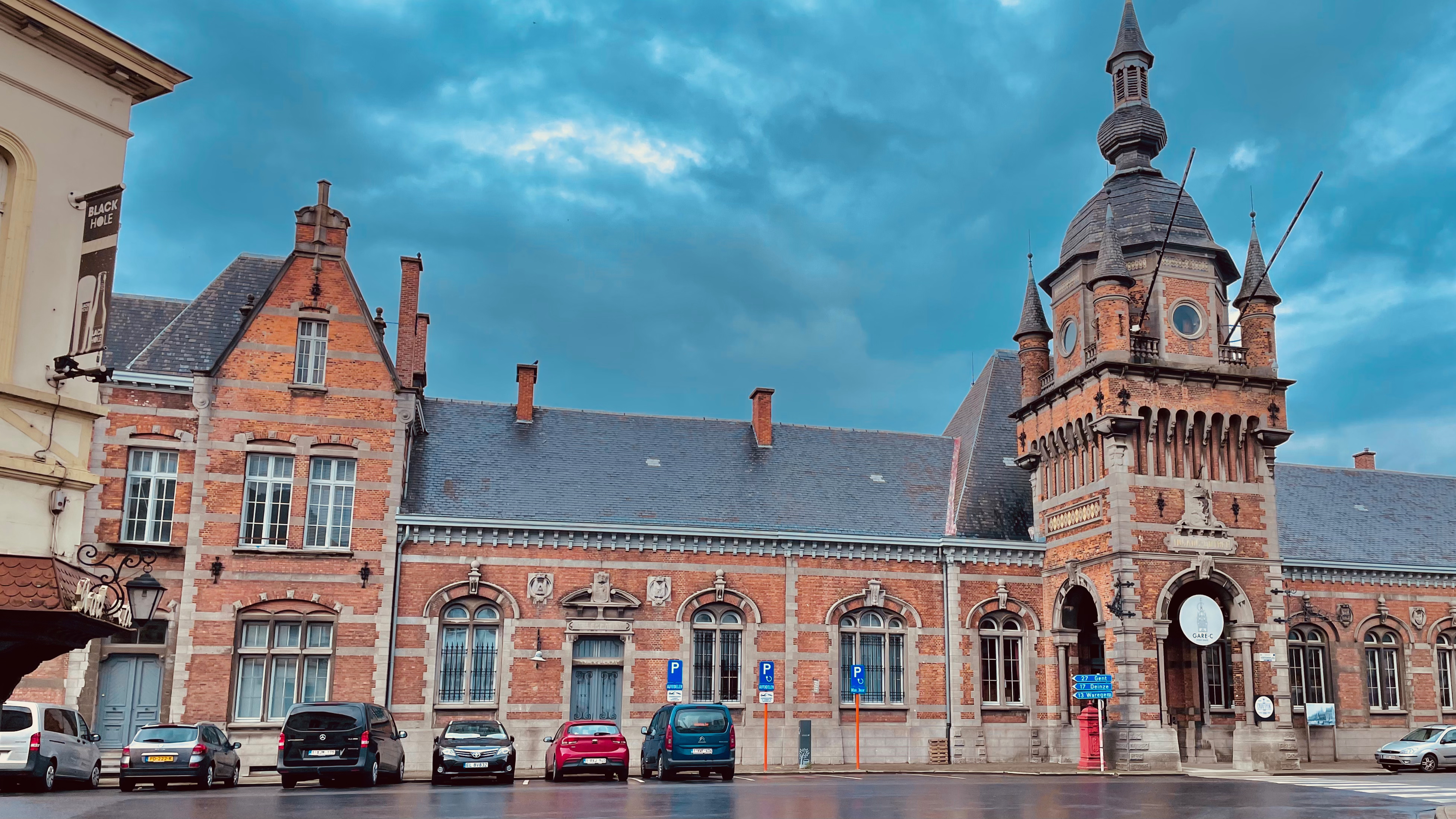
Oudenaarde railway station in Bevere

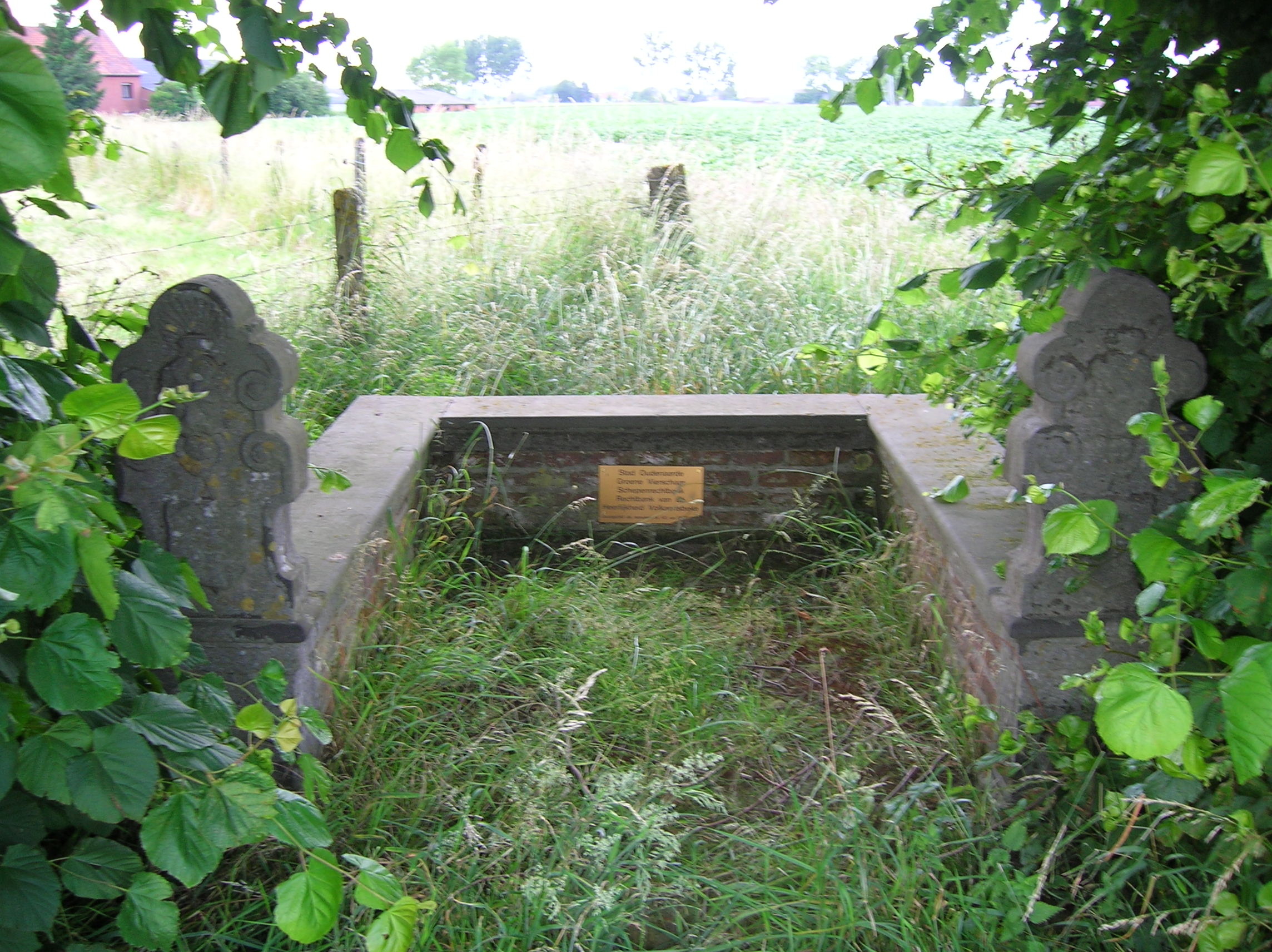
Vierschaar

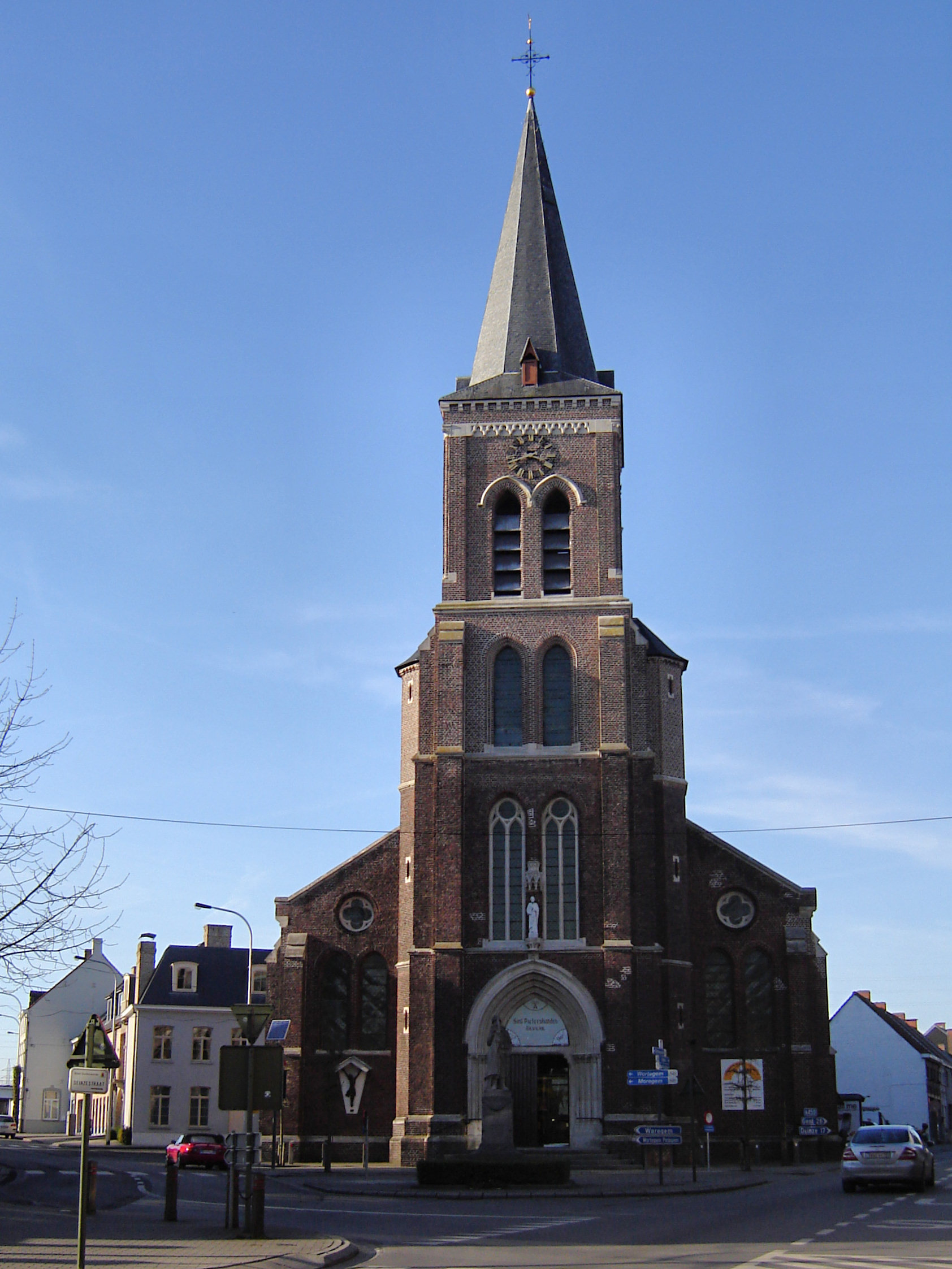
St Peter Church

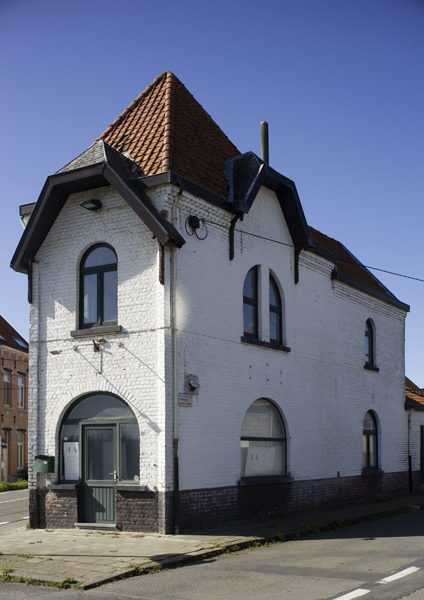
Corner house
