= Liefmans Brewery =

Belgian brewery

Coordinates: 50.8466°N 3.6158°E

Brouweij Liefmans
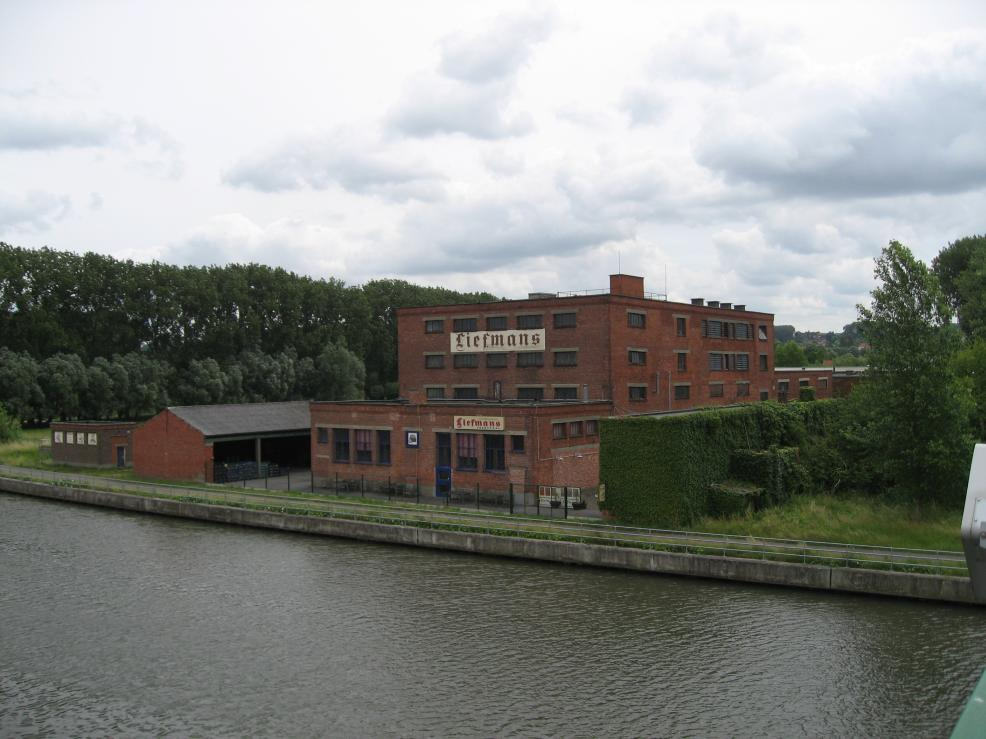
- Interactive map of Brouweij Liefmans
- Location: Oudenaarde, Belgium

Active beers
Name	Type
Cuve-Brut	Kriek
Goudenband	Oud bruin
Liefmans	Kriek
Oud Bruin	Oud bruin

Liefmans is a Belgian brewery which produces oud bruin and other Belgian beers. It was founded in 1679. The company went bankrupt in 2008 and was acquired by Duvel Moortgat. Liefmans' wheat beer, Dentergems Wit, and a Belgian ale, Lucifer, were subsequently taken over by Het Anker Brewery.
