= Oedelem =

Coordinates: 51°10′N 3°20′E

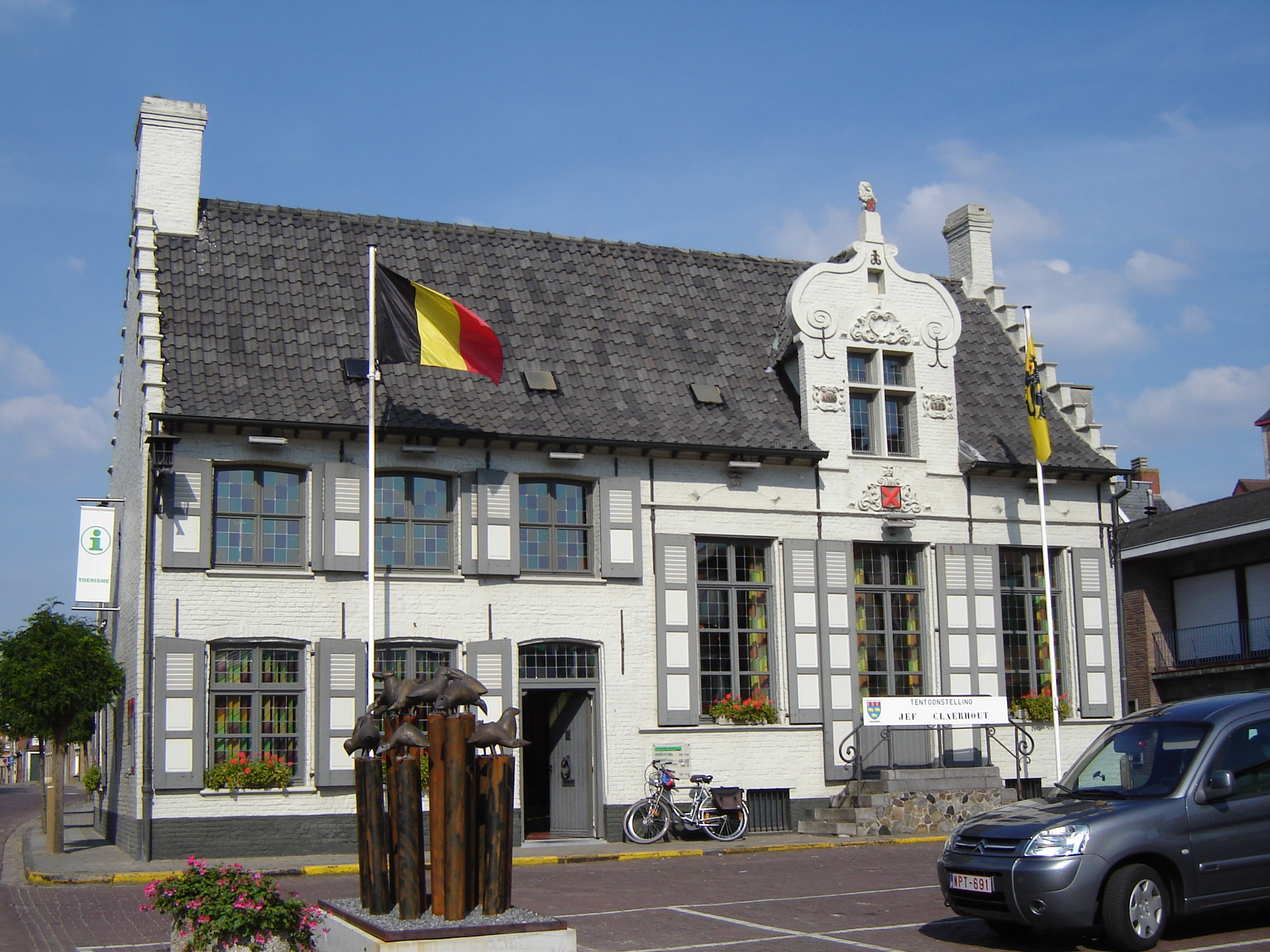
Former Oedelem town hall

Oedelem is a town in Beernem, a part of West Flanders, Belgium.

== Gallery ==
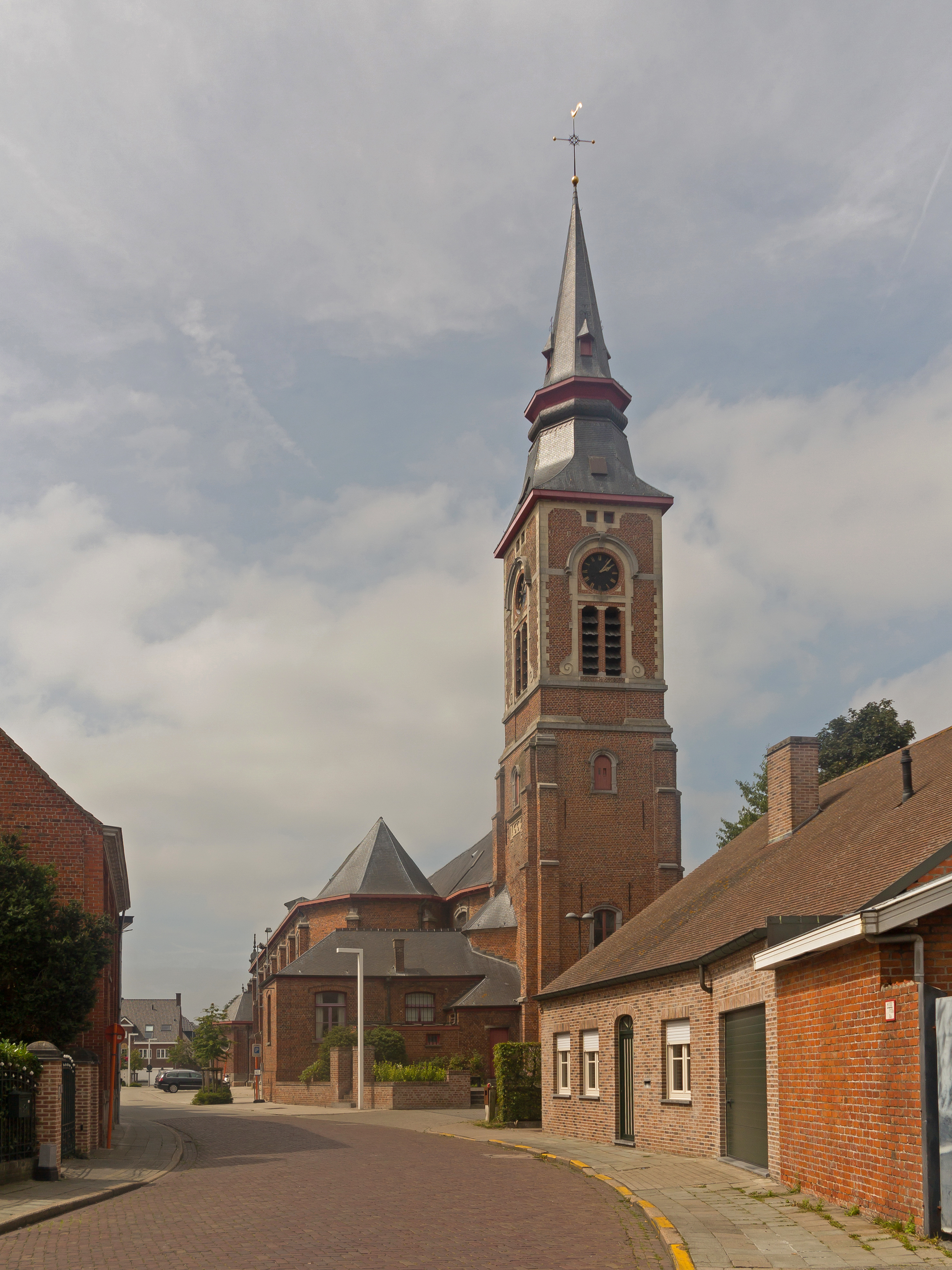
Oedelem, church: the Sint Lambertuskerk

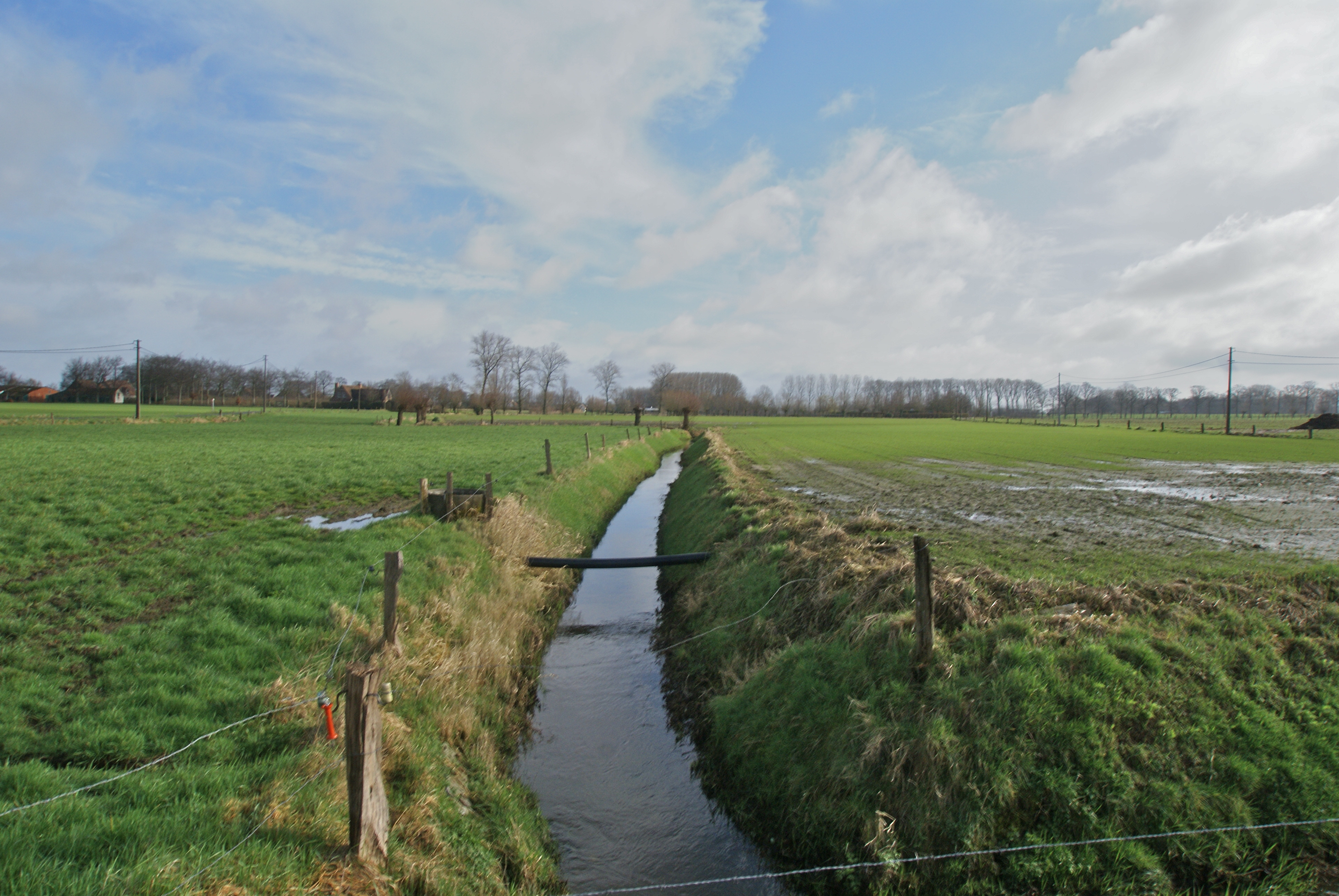
The river Bergbeek at the Weg naar Sint-Kruis

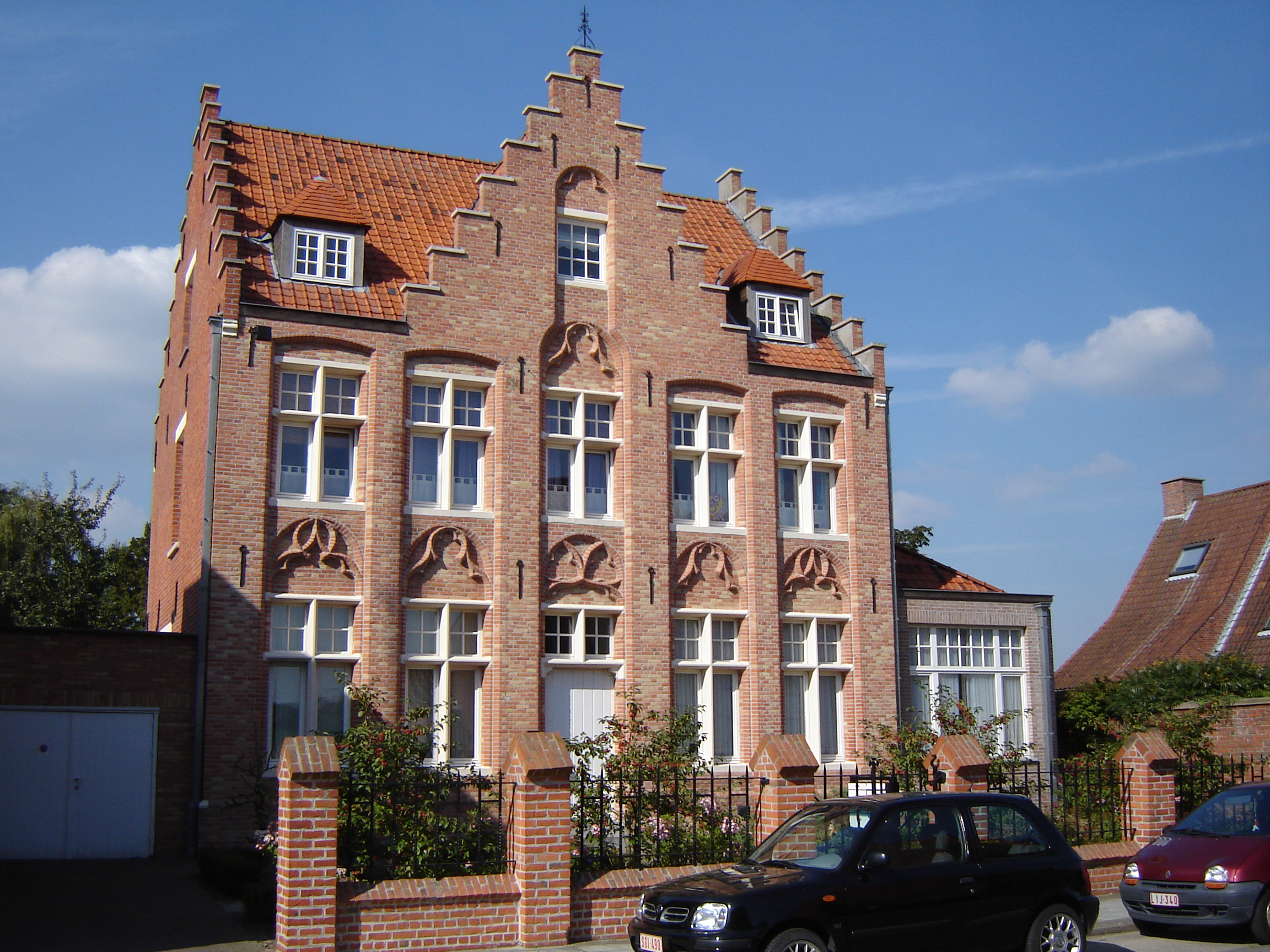
The rectory of Oostveld (Oedelem)
