= Oudenaarde =

Municipality in Flemish Community, Belgium

- City and municipality
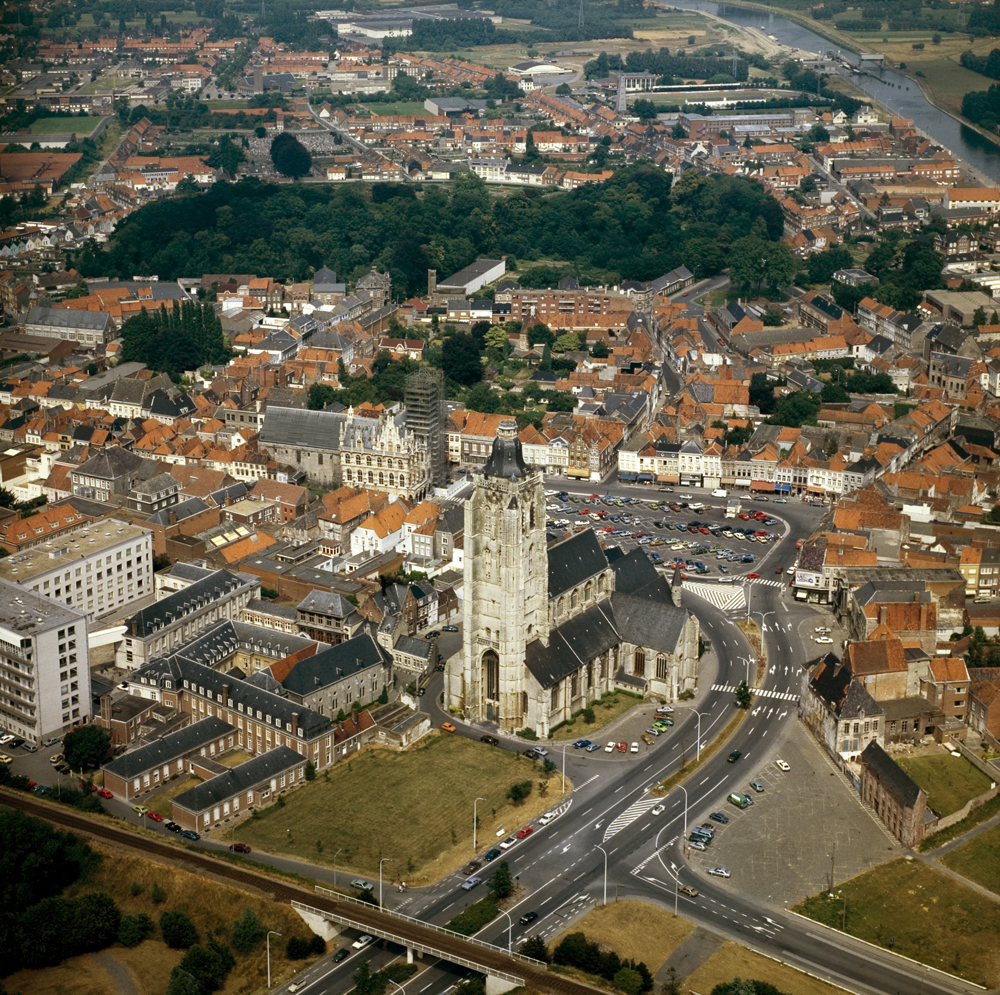

- Flag Coat of arms

- Location of Oudenaarde in East Flanders
- Interactive map of Oudenaarde
- Location in Belgium
- Coordinates: 50°51′N 03°36′E
- Country: Belgium
- Community: Flemish Community
- Region: Flemish Region
- Province: East Flanders
- Arrondissement: Oudenaarde

Government
  - Mayor: John Adam (Open VLD)
  - Governing parties: Open VLD, CD&V

Area
  - Total: 68.92 km^{2} (26.61 sq mi)

Population (2022-01-01)
  - Total: 31,866
  - Density: 462.4/km^{2} (1,198/sq mi)
- Postal codes: 9700
- NIS code: 45035
- Area codes: 055
- Website: www.oudenaarde.be

Oudenaarde (Dutch pronunciation: [ˈʌudənaːrdə]; French: Audenarde [odnaʁd]; in English sometimes Oudenarde) is a Belgian city and municipality in the Flemish province of East Flanders. The municipality comprises the city of Oudenaarde proper and the towns of Bevere, Edelare, Eine, Ename, Heurne, Leupegem, Mater, Melden, Mullem, Nederename, Volkegem, Welden and a part of Ooike.

From the 15th to the 18th century, but especially in the 16th century, Oudenaarde was known as a centre of tapestry production. The town's name, meaning "old field", still lingers on in "outnal", an obsolete English term for a kind of brown linen thread.

== History ==
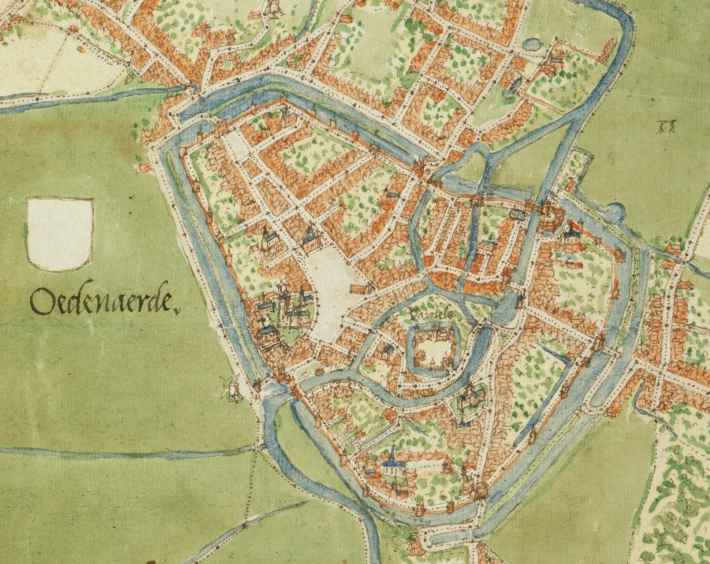
Oudenaarde on the Deventer map (around 1558)

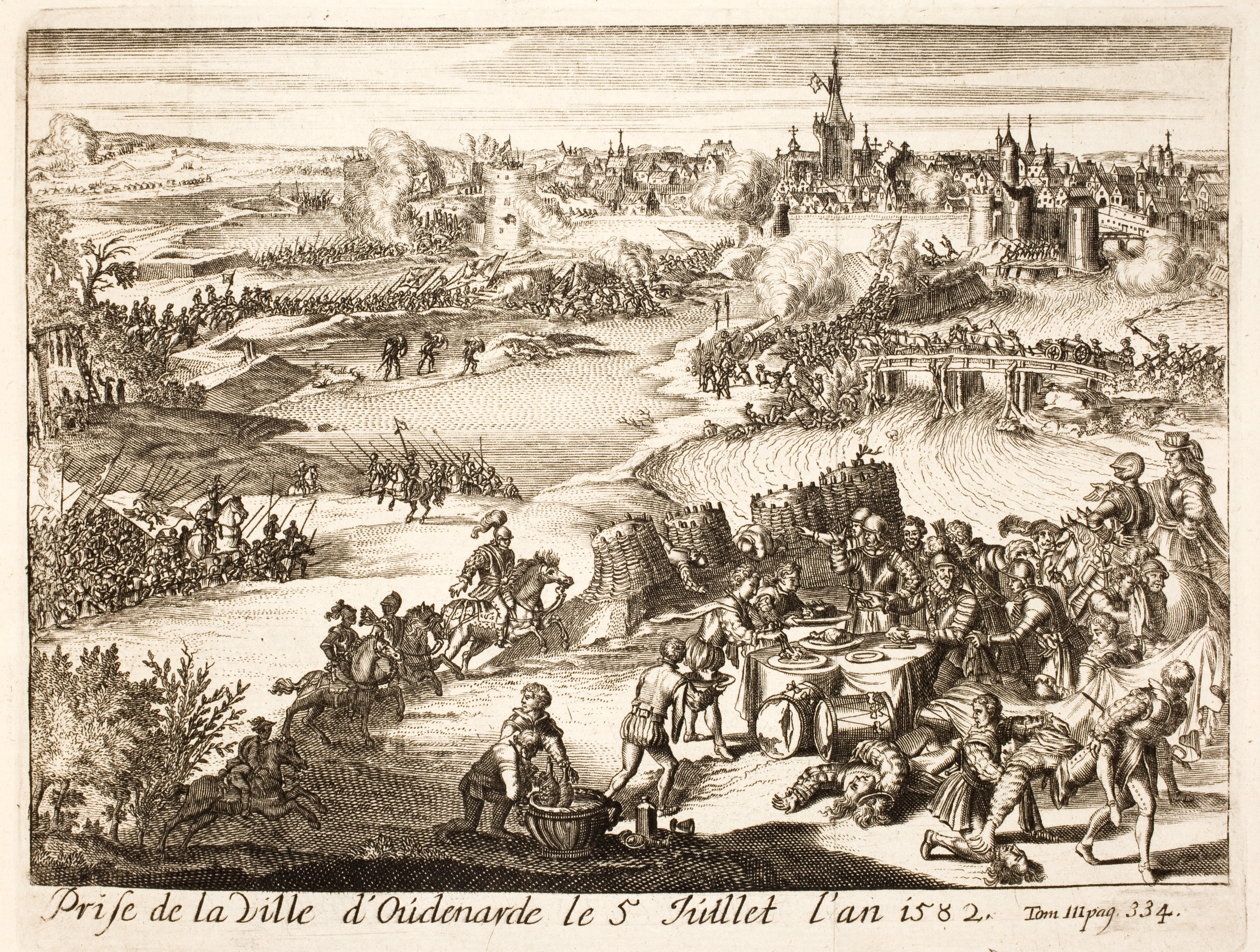
Capture of Oudenaarde by Alexander Farnese, 1582

=== The glory of Ename ===
The history of the current municipality of Oudenaarde starts in 974, when Otto II, Holy Roman Emperor and king of Germany, built one of its three fortifications on the Scheldt at Ename to protect his kingdom against possible attacks from Francia (next to the other frontier post at Valenciennes, later in also the Margraviate of Antwerp). Ename grew very fast. By 1005, the town already had a couple of churches and had become the largest town in the Duchy of Lotharingia. In 1034, Ename was destroyed by an irregular army that surrendered the city to Count Baldwin IV. In 1047, the son of Baldwin V (peacefully) received the imperial fief from the German emperor. The fief was, however, confiscated in 1047 when the Baldwins rebelled against the German empire. In 1062, Baldwin V, together with his wife, founded the Benedictine abbey of Saint Salvator. By that time, the former merchants and guild artisans of Ename easily got across the Scheldt to the recently founded city of Oudenaarde.

=== Oudenaarde’s golden age ===
In the 11th century, Oudenaarde's economy flourished, thanks to the proximity of the Scheldt and the burgeoning but vibrant cloth and tapestry industry. Churches, cloisters and hospitals were built. Throughout the Middle Ages, the city was one of the staunchest supporters of the counts of Flanders, defending them against insurrections from the South and even from Ghent. The city became known as the residence of the nobles. It built itself a flagship town hall (built 1526–1537), which we can still admire today, and the St-Walburga church. Charles V stayed here for a couple of months in 1522 and fathered an illegitimate daughter, Margaret of Parma, who was to become Regent of the Netherlands.

=== Decline ===
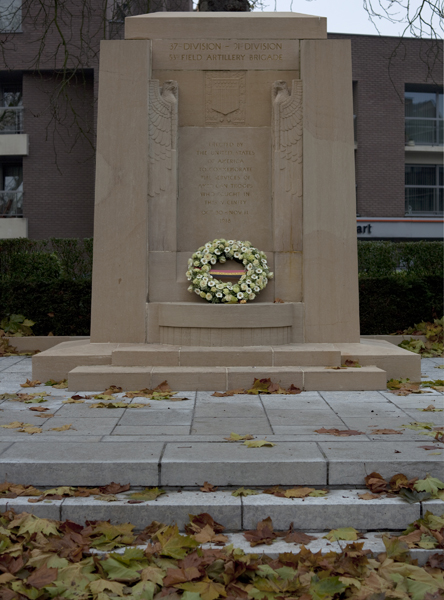
Monument in Oudenaarde honoring the 40,000 members of the US 37th and 91st Divisions who fought there October 30 – November 11, 1918

During the Reformation, the people of Oudenaarde chose Protestantism and allied themselves with Ghent against Charles V. In 1582, after a prolonged siege by Margaret's son, Alexander Farnese, the city finally gave in, causing most merchants, workers, and even nobles to flee. Oudenaarde fell under the Counter-Reformation, which for a short while revived the commerce of tapestry. The glory days, however, never came back. The French attacked and took the city three times in less than a century. Fortifications were repeatedly improved in the 16th and 17th centuries, including additions by Vauban. In 1708, one of the key battles in the War of the Spanish Succession, known as the Battle of Oudenaarde, was fought in the vicinity of the city. Oudenaarde slumbered as a provincial town under the Habsburg regime. Like its neighbours, in the 1790s, it suffered religious curtailment imposed by the French Revolution.

The city later suffered damage during World War I, which is commemorated by several monuments scattered around town.

During World War II the town was occupied by Nazi German forces in May 1940. The town was liberated by British forces on the 5th of September 1944.

== Beer ==
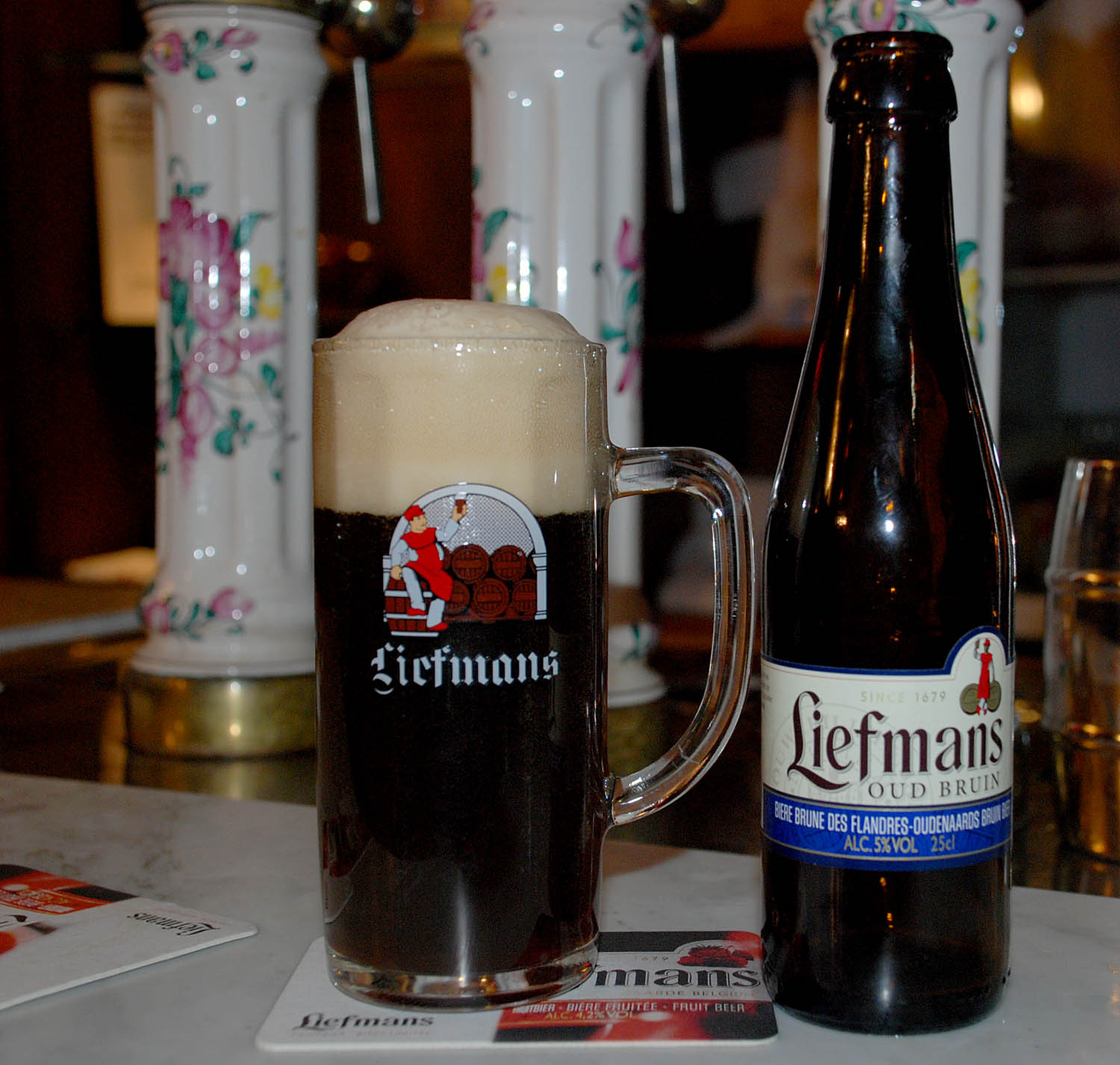
Liefmans Oud Bruin

Oudenaarde is known for the brewing of Oud bruin beer, which is sometimes termed Oudenaarde Oud bruin, especially that of Liefmans Brewery in the town.

Oud Bruin (Old Brown), also known as Flanders Brown, is a style of beer originating from the Flemish region of Belgium. The Dutch name refers to the long aging process, up to a year. It undergoes a secondary fermentation, which takes several weeks to a month, followed by bottle ageing for several more months. The extended ageing allows residual yeast and bacteria to develop a sour flavour characteristic for this style. Usually, cultured yeast and bacteria are used, as stainless steel does not harbour wild organisms as wood does.

== Sights ==
- The Flamboyant Gothic–style Town Hall and its Belfry were designated by UNESCO as a World Heritage Site in 1999. The city hall houses a unique collection of Oudenaarde tapestries.
- The Church of Our Lady of Pamele, begun in 1234 on the banks of the Scheldt, and the Church of St Walburga near the market square, are both worth a visit.
- Oudenaarde is also home to the Centrum Tour of Flanders, a museum dedicated to the Tour of Flanders cycling race.
- Since 2008, the village of Mater in Oudenaarde has been the home of Belgium's smallest craft brewery: the Smisje Brewery (previously located in Bruges).
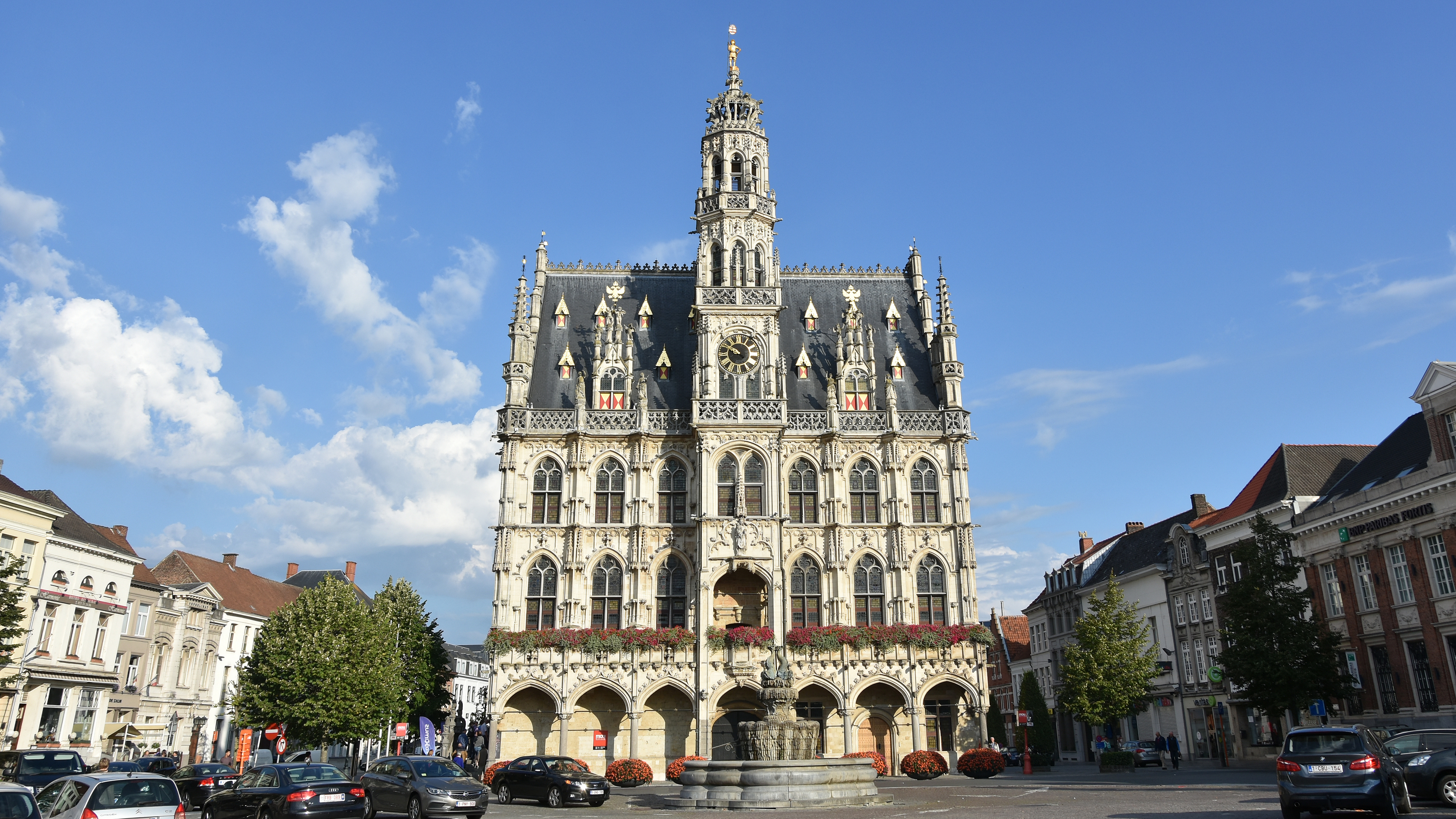
Oudenaarde Town Hall

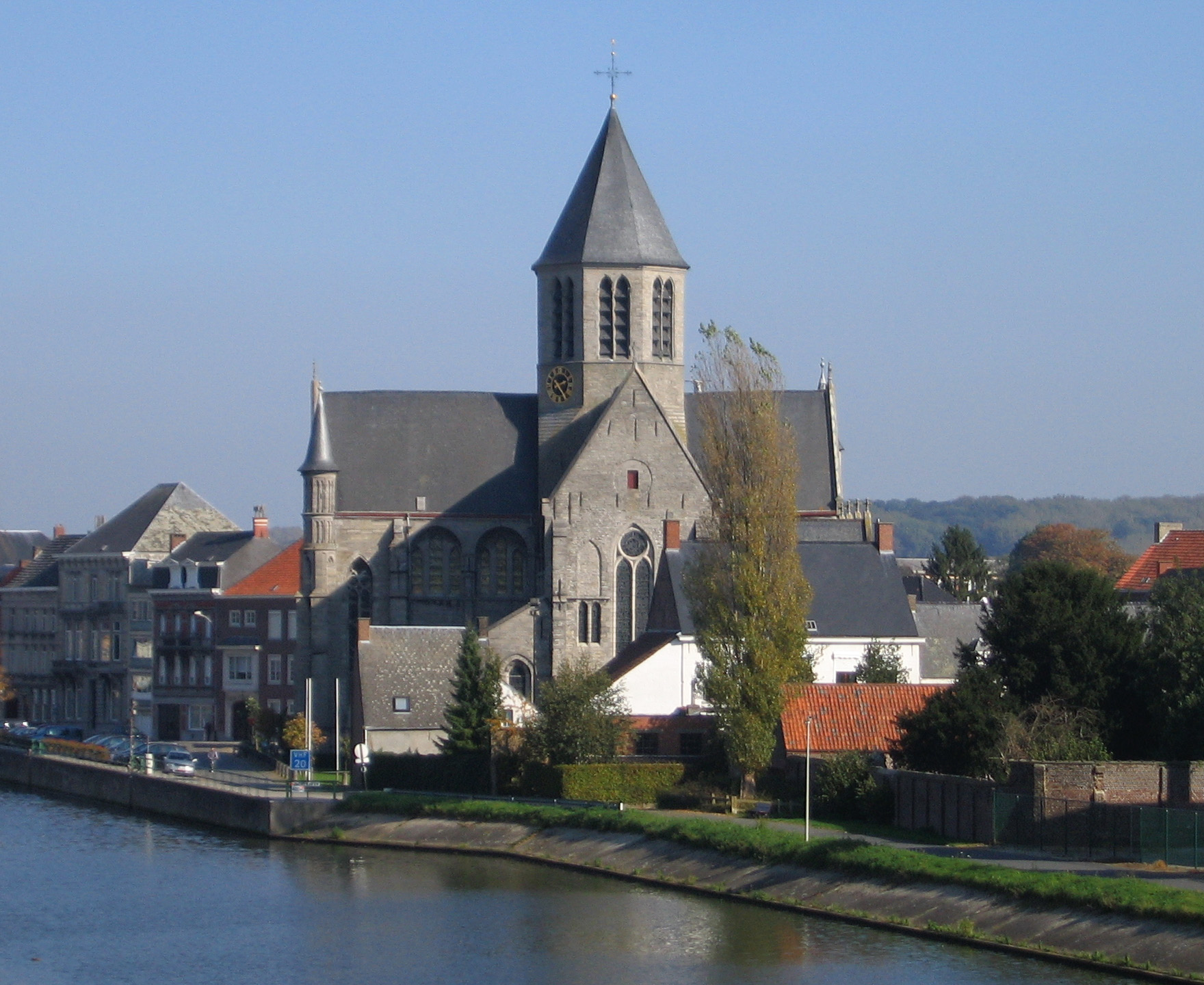
Church of Our Lady of Pamele

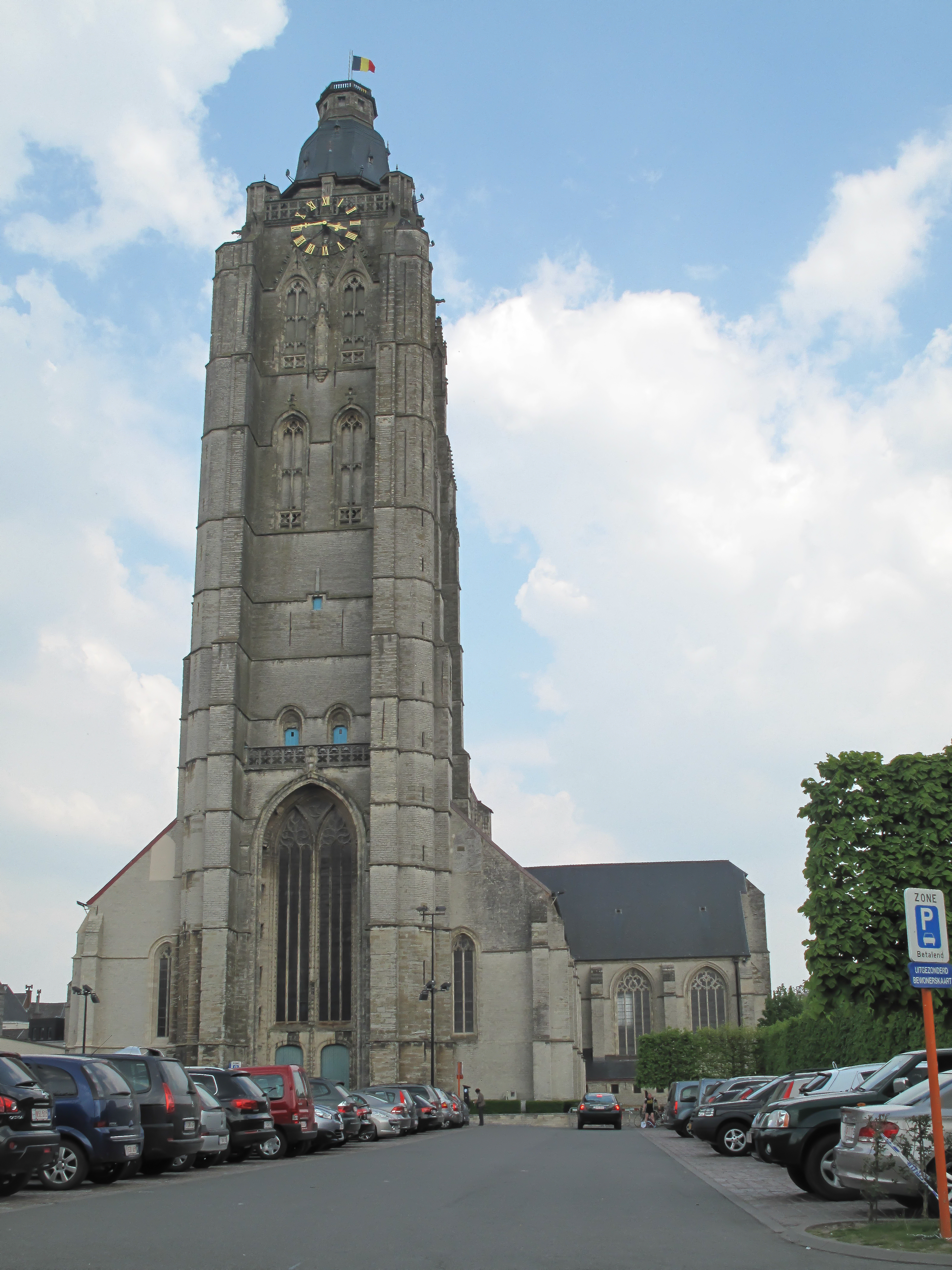
Saint Walburga's church, Oudenaarde

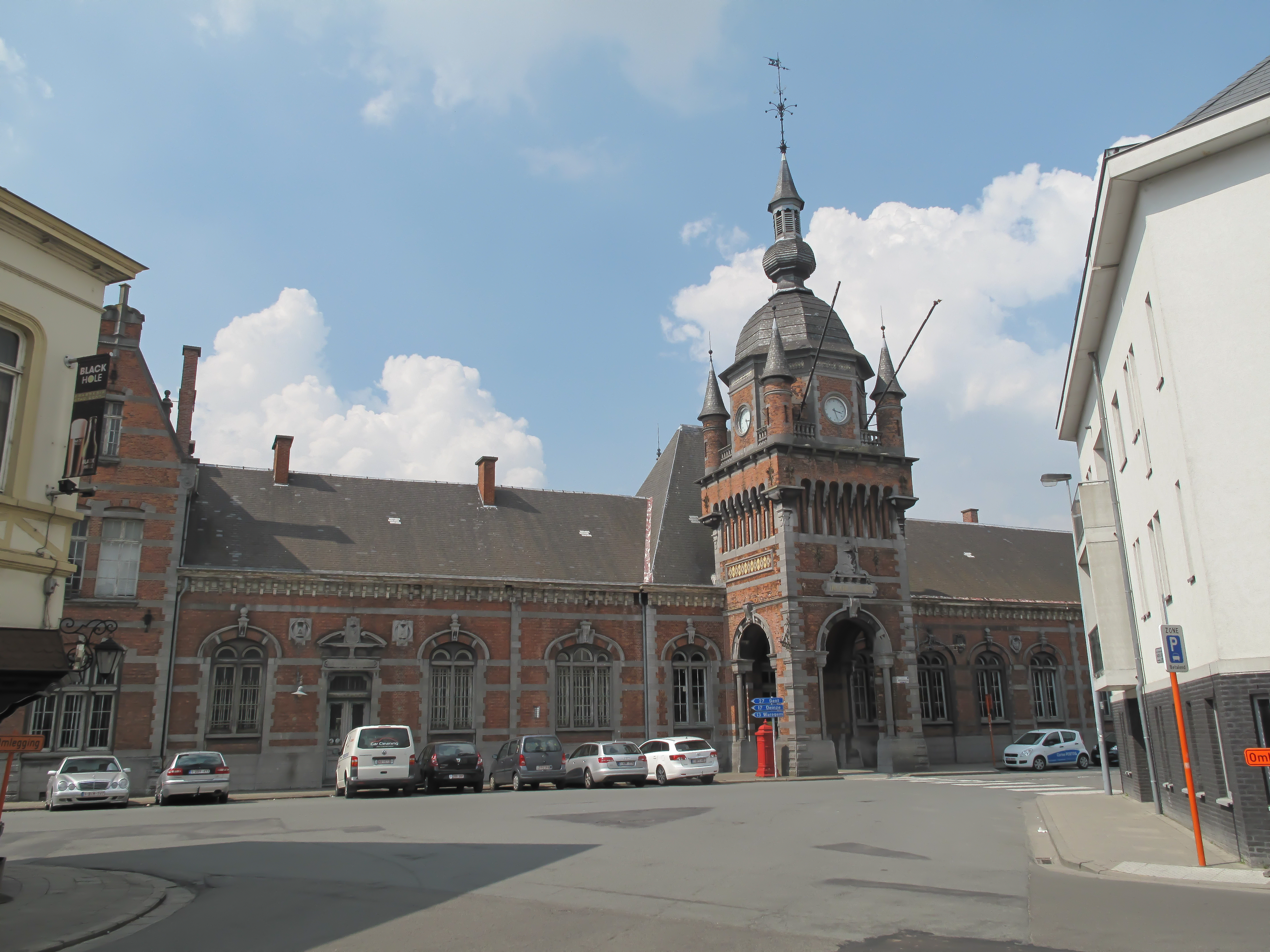
Oudenaarde railway station

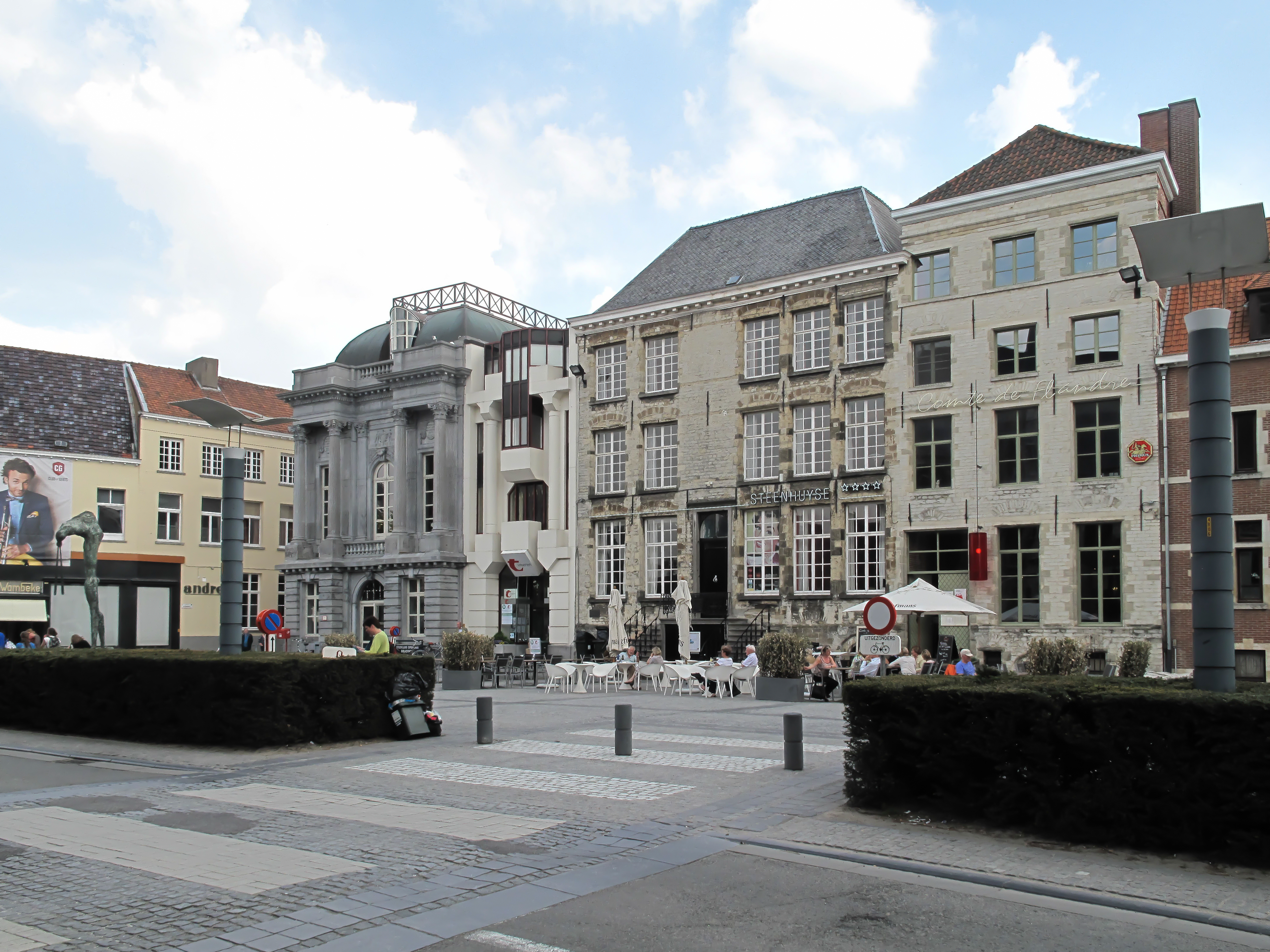
The marketplace, Oudenaarde

== Events ==
- Recurring events include a beer fest in June, an open-air musical festival in the summer, and an agricultural fair in February.
- Every ten years, one of the largest floral displays in Flanders takes place on the market square (Grote Markt). The last one took place in 2005.

== Newspaper ==
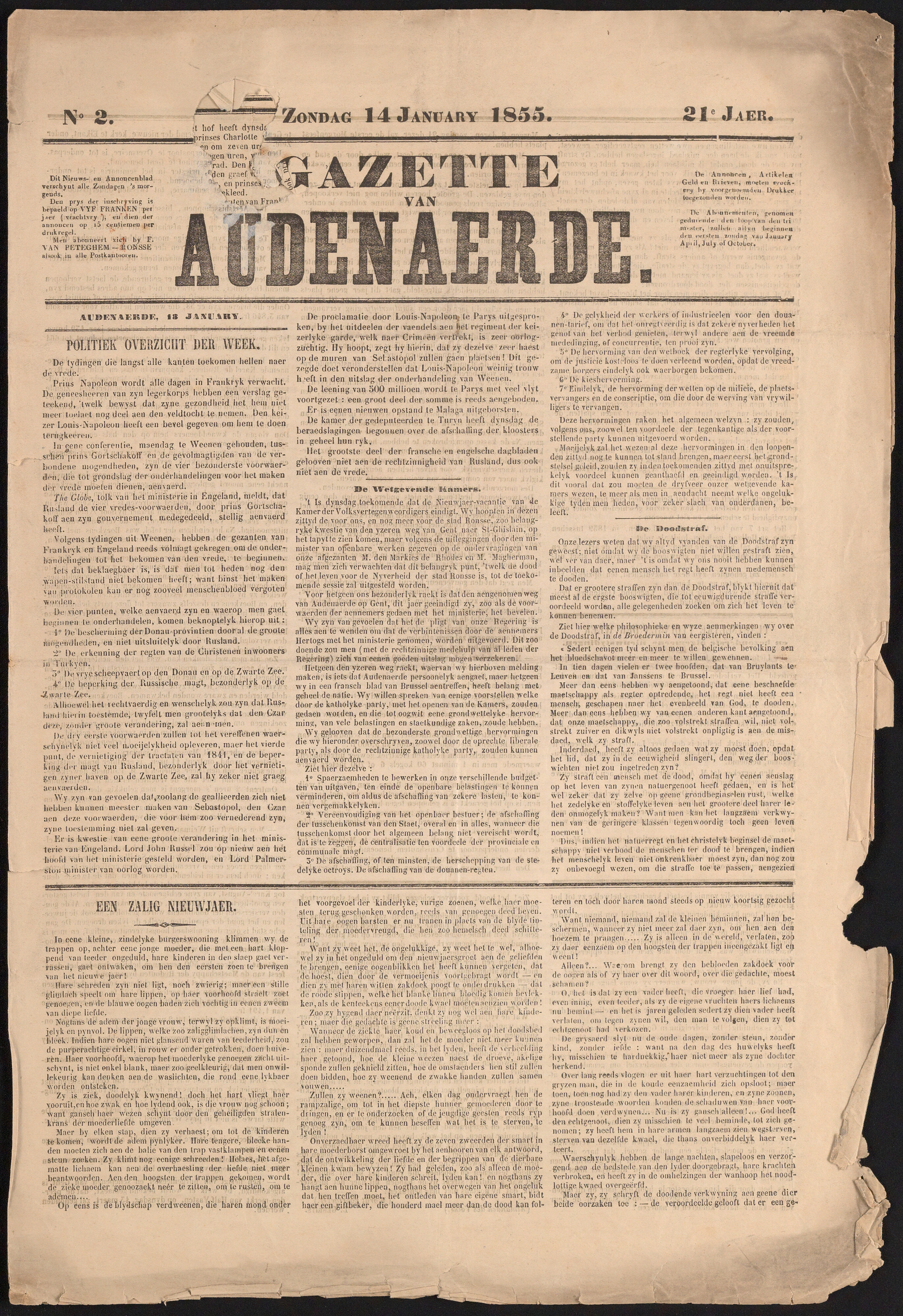
Excerpt from the Gazette of Oudenaarde from the year 1855. Preserverd in the Ghent University Library.

Oudenaarde used to have its own newspaper, namely the Gazette van Audenaerde.

== Sports ==
The main football club in Oudenaarde is KSV Oudenaarde.

The celebrated Tour of Flanders voor Vrouwen, the women's Tour of Flanders cycle race, starts in Oudenaarde every spring. The men's Tour of Flanders has passed through Oudenaarde on several occasions, finishing in the town since 2012, and it regularly ascends the Koppenberg hill in the municipality. The Koppenbergcross cyclo-cross race, which takes place on the Koppenberg hillside, is part of the BPost Bank Trophy.

Rhinos Rugby Oudenaarde is a rugby club in Oudenaarde that was voted the coolest club of Flanders in 2018.

== Notable inhabitants ==
- The Viscount of Audenaerde
- Arnold of Soissons, saint (1040–1087)
- Margaret of Parma, daughter of Charles V and Regent of the Netherlands (1522–1586)
- Henri-Charles Lambrecht, bishop, born in Welden.
- Johannes van den Driesche, orientalist and exegete (1550–1616)
- Adriaen Brouwer, painter (1605–1638)
- Charles Liedts, politician (1802–1878)
- Gentil Theodoor Antheunis, poet (1840–1907)
- Reimond Stijns, writer (1850–1905)
- Robert Herberigs, painter, writer and musician (1886–1974)
- Arthur Decabooter, cyclist, born in Welden (1936–2012)
- André Dierickx, road racing cyclist (b. 1946)
- Jotie T'Hooft, poet (1956–1977)
- Bart Kaëll, singer and TV host (b. 1960)
- Eric Van Lancker, cyclist (b. 1961)
- Mario De Clercq, cyclist, three-time world cyclo-cross champion (b. 1966)
- Frank De Bleeckere, football referee (b. 1966)
- Jonathan Page, cyclist, American cyclo-cross champion (b. 1976)
- Brigitta Callens, Miss Belgium 1999 (b. 1980)
- Charlotte Vandermeersch, actress (b. 1983)
- Stijn Vandenbergh, cyclist (b. 1984)
- Kenny De Ketele, track cyclist, Madison World Champion (b. 1985)
- Jan Bakelants, cyclist (b. 1986)
- Jan Dequeker, professor, humanitarian and philanthropist (b. 1997)

== International relations ==
=== Twin towns—sister cities ===
- Coburg, Germany (1972)
- Bergen op Zoom, Netherlands (1986)
- Castel Madama, Italy (1986)
- Arras, France (1990)
- Hastings, United Kingdom (1991)
- Buzău, Romania (2007)
