= Oud bruin =

Belgian type of beer

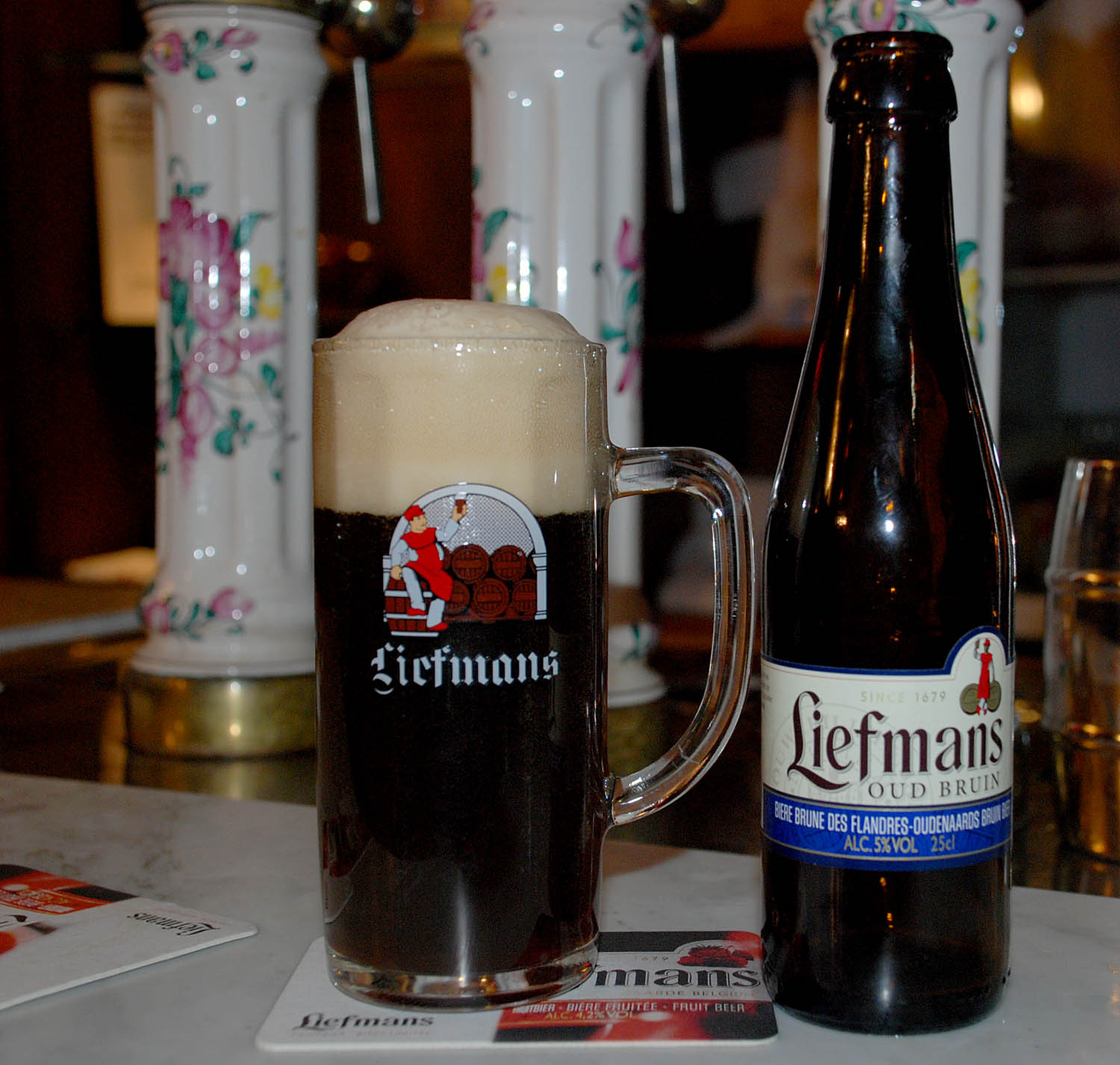
- Liefman's oud bruin
- Country of origin: Belgium
- Yeast type: Top-fermenting
- Alcohol by volume: 4 - 8%
- Color (SRM): 15 - 22
- Bitterness (IBU): 15 - 25
- Original gravity: 1.043 - 1.077
- Final gravity: 1.012 - 1.016
- Malt percentage: 90% - 100%

Oud bruin (old brown), also known as Flanders brown, is a style of beer originating from the Flemish region of Belgium. The Dutch name refers to the long aging process, up to a year. It undergoes a secondary fermentation, which takes several weeks to a month, and is followed by bottle aging for several more months. The extended aging allows residual yeast and bacteria to develop a sour flavor characteristic for this style. Usually, cultured yeast and bacteria are used, as stainless steel equipment does not harbor wild organisms as wood does.

== History ==
These beers were kept as so called provision beers, to be stored and allow the flavour to develop. Liefmans Brewery has been brewing the style since the 17th century. Historical examples tended to be more sour than modern commercial products. Brouwerij De Brabandere in Bavikhove still produces a traditionally barrel-aged oud bruin under the Petrus brand.

== Characteristics ==
This style of beer is medium bodied, reddish-brown, and has a gentle malty flavor and no hop bitterness. Commercial versions may mix aged beer with younger, sweeter beer to temper the acidity and allow for further fermentation.

Because of the reddish-brown colour, the Flanders red ale could be confused with Flanders brown, but the differences include different brewing techniques and aging processes resulting in different taste characteristics.

== Examples ==
- 't Verzet Oud Bruin (Anzegem, Belgium)
- Ichtegem Oud Bruin (Ichtegem, Belgium)
- Liefmans Goudenband (Oudenaarde, Belgium)
- Petrus Oud Bruin (Bavikhove, Belgium)
- Queue de charreu brune (Comines-Warneton, Belgium)
- Deschutes Dissident (Bend, Oregon, United States)
