= Poland in antiquity =

History of Poland from 400 BC to 500 AD

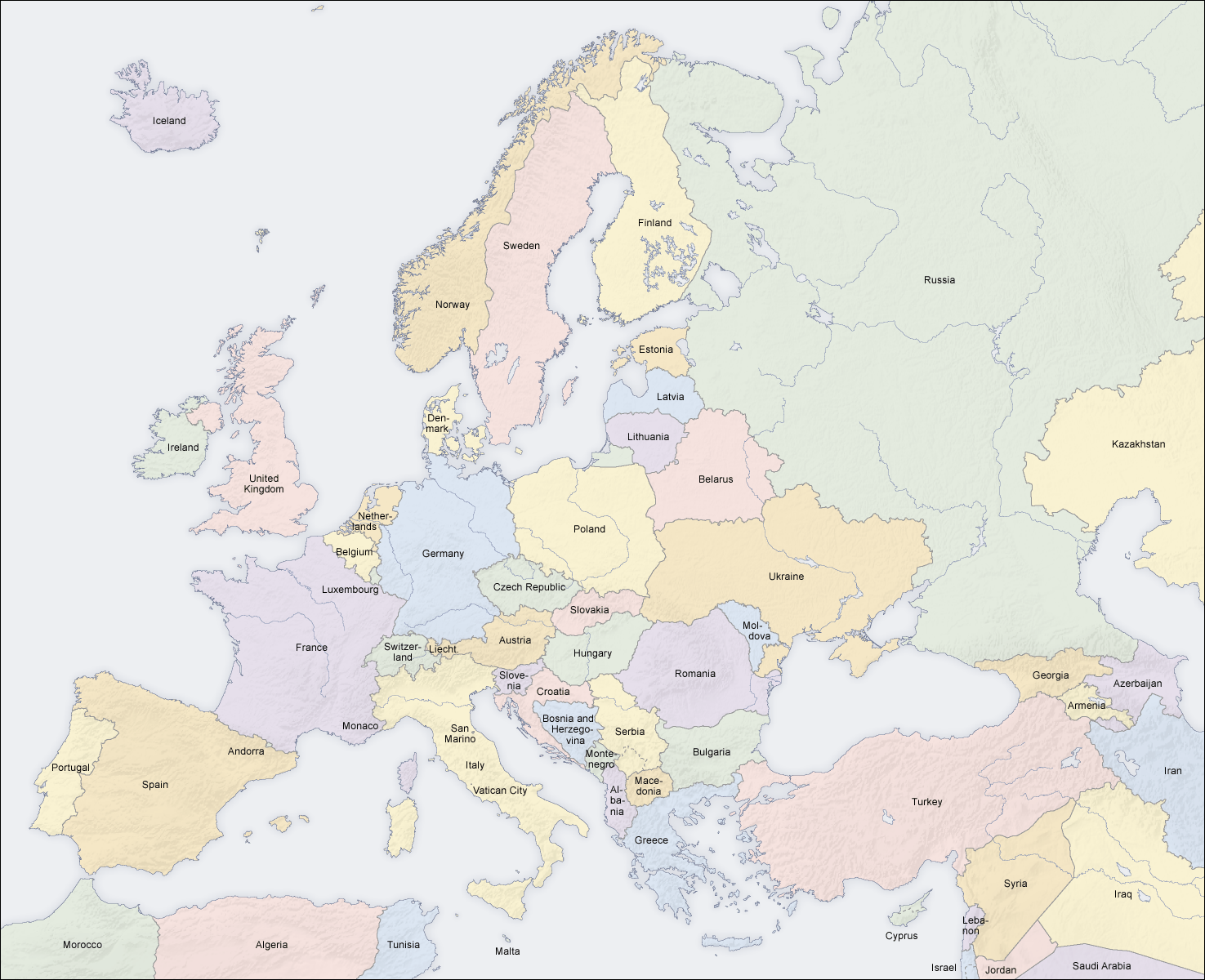
Location of Poland in Europe

Poland in antiquity was characterized by peoples from various archaeological cultures living in and migrating through various parts of what is now Poland, from about 400 BC to 450–500 AD. These people are identified as Slavs, Celts, Germanic peoples, Balts, Thracians, Avars, and Scythians. Other groups, difficult to identify, were most likely also present, as the ethnic composition of archaeological cultures is often poorly recognized. While lacking any written language to speak of, many of them developed a relatively advanced material culture and social organization, as evidenced by the archaeological record; for example, richly furnished, "princely" dynastic graves.

Characteristic of the period was a high rate of migration of large groups of people, even equivalents of modern nations. This article covers the continuation of the Iron Age (see Bronze and Iron Age Poland), the La Tène and Roman influence, and Migration periods. The La Tène era is divided into:

- La Tène A, 450–400 BC
- La Tène B, 400–250 BC
- La Tène C, 250–150 BC
- La Tène D, 150–0 BC

400–200 BC is also considered the early pre-Roman period, and 200–0 BC the younger pre-Roman period (A). These eras were followed by the period of Roman influence:

- Early stage: 0–150 AD
  - 0–80 B_{1}
  - 80–150 B_{2}
- Late stage: 150–375 AD
  - 150–250 C_{1}
  - 250–300 C_{2}
  - 300–375 C_{3}

The years 375–500 AD constituted the (pre-Slavic) Migration Period (D and E).

Beginning in the early 4th century BC, Celts established a number of settlement centers. Most of these were in what is now southern Poland, which was at the outer edge of their expansion. Through their highly developed economy and crafts, they exerted lasting cultural influence disproportional to their small numbers in the region.

Expanding and moving out of their homeland in Scandinavia and Northern Germany, Germanic peoples lived south of the Baltic Sea for several centuries, during which period many of their tribes also migrated outward to the south and east (see Wielbark culture). With the expansion of the Roman Empire, the Germanic tribes came under Roman cultural influence. Some written remarks by Roman authors that are relevant to the developments on Polish lands have been preserved; they give additional insight when compared with the archaeological record. In the end, as the Roman Empire was nearing its collapse and the nomadic peoples invading from the east destroyed, damaged, or destabilized the various extant Germanic cultures and societies, the Germanic tribes left Central and Eastern Europe for the safer and wealthier western and southern parts of the European continent.

The northeast corner of today's Poland was and remained populated by Baltic tribes. They were at the outer limits of the significant cultural influence of the Roman Empire.

== Celtic peoples ==
Celtic expansion beginning with core La Tène culture area (from 450 BC; yellow), developing over the older Hallstatt area (green); maximum distribution c. 300 BC (orange)

=== Archaeological cultures and groups ===
Celts first arrived in Poland from Bohemia and Moravia around or after 400 BC, just a few decades after their La Tène culture emerged. They formed several enclaves mostly in the south of the country, within the Pomeranian or Lusatian populations or in areas abandoned by those peoples. The cultures or groups that were Celtic or had a Celtic element (mixed Celtic and autochthonous) lasted at their furthest extent to 170 AD (Púchov culture). After the Celts appeared and during their tenure (they were always a small minority), the bulk of the population had begun acquiring the traits of archaeological cultures with a dominant Germanic component. In Europe, the expansion of Rome and the pressures exerted by Germanic peoples checked and reversed the Celtic expansion.

Initially, two groups established themselves on fertile grounds in Silesia: one on the left bank of the Oder River south of Wrocław, in the area that included Mount Ślęża; the other around the Głubczyce highlands. Both these groups stayed in their respective regions in 400–120 BC. Burials and other significant Celtic sites in Głubczyce County have been investigated in Kietrz and nearby Nowa Cerekwia. The Ślęża group eventually assimilated into the local population, while the one in the Głubczyce highlands apparently migrated south. More-recent discoveries include Celtic settlements in Wrocław County, such as, in Wojkowice, the well-preserved 3rd-century-BC grave of a woman with bronze and iron bracelets, brooches, rings, and chains.

Later, two more groups arrived and settled the upper San River basin (270–170 BC) and the Kraków area. The latter group, together with the local population that was at about that time developing the characteristics of the Przeworsk culture (see next section), formed the mixed Tyniec group, which existed 270–30 BC. The Tyniec group's era of dominance was c. 80–70 BC, when the existing settlements got Celtic reinforcements from the more southerly populations that were being displaced from Slovakia by the Dacians. In the 1st century BC, another small group settled in future Poland, probably much further north, in Kujawy. Finally, there was the long-lasting (270 BC–170 AD) mixed Púchov culture, whom Roman sources associated with the Celtic Cotini, whose northern reaches included parts of the Beskids mountain range and even the Kraków area.

=== Agriculture, technology, art, and trade ===
Ancient Celtic agriculture was advanced. Celtic farmers used ploughs with iron shares and fertilized fields with animal manure. Their livestock consisted of selected breeds, especially sheep and large cattle.

The Celts who settled in Poland brought with them and disseminated various achievements of La Tène culture, including a variety of tools and other inventions. One of them was the quern-stone, which had a stationary lower stone and an upper one rotated by a lever. They also introduced iron furnaces to Poland. Iron was obtained in greater quantities from locally available turf ores; its metallurgy and processing were improved, resulting in the manufacture of stronger and more-resistant tools and weapons. Ceramic-makers used the potter's wheel and (especially the Tyniec group) produced, with great precision, thin-walled painted vessels, among the best in Europe. Domed bilevel furnaces were used; pots were placed on a perforated clay shelf, with the hearth beneath. The Celts also produced glass and enamel, and they processed gold and semi-precious stones for jewelry.

The Celtic communities maintained extensive trade contacts with Greek cities, Etruria, and then Rome. They were involved in the amber trade between the Baltic and Adriatic seas, but amber was also worked in local shops. In the 1st century BC, coins of gold and silver, in addition to the more common metals, were used and minted around Kraków and elsewhere. In Gorzów near Oświęcim, a treasure of Celtic coins was discovered. Original Celtic art found its expression in numerous designs that incorporated plant, animal, and anthropomorphic motifs. These various Celtic achievements were adopted by the native populations, but usually with considerable delay.

=== Prominent settlements and burial sites ===
The settlement in Nowa Cerekwia was active from the beginning of 4th to the end of the 2nd century BC. A hundred people lived in over 20 houses supported by pillars, with walls made of beams, finished with clay and painted. Though Celtic settlements in Poland were established at various elevations, they had no defensive reinforcements. After the Celts abandoned the area, the Nowa Cerekiew settlement remained uninhabited for 150 years before being reoccupied by Przeworsk people and later, Slavs. Objects recently found at Nowa Cerekiew include a collection of gold and silver coins minted by the Boii tribe (3rd–2nd century BC), Greek coins from Sicily and other colonies, and various metal decorative items. Clay containers, jewelry, and tools have been recovered in the past. Nowa Cerekiew was a major Celtic trade and political center, one of the very few in central Europe, a source of great profits and the northernmost of their Amber Road stations.

Among the most significant Celtic finds in Lesser Poland are the extensive and wealthy settlement in Podłęże and its associated cemetery in Zakrzowiec, both in Wieliczka County; and a multi-period settlement complex in Aleksandrowice, Kraków County. The Podłęże site was occupied from the mid-3rd century BC onward and yielded many metal objects, coins and blank coin molds, and a large collection of glass bracelets. The Celtic graves at Zakrzowiec are dugout rectangular enclosures several meters long that contain ashes and grave offerings such as pottery and personal ornaments. Graves of the same type but of a later time, 1st–2nd century CE, are also found around Kraków, demonstrating the continuation of Celtic traditions even after the arrival of Germanic tribes in the area. The Celtic burial site investigated in Aleksandrowice contains a rich 2nd-century-BC assemblage of funerary gifts, including iron weapons. The unique elaborate designs of these items, including a scabbard with a recurring dragon motif, have been found only in the areas of Celtic settlement in Slovenia and western Croatia.

=== Spiritual life and cult sites ===
Within the realm of Celtic spiritual life, there was considerable variation. Fourth- and early-3rd-century BC burials in Wrocław and Ślęża region are skeletal. Sometimes a man and a woman were buried together, suggesting the known Celtic practice of sacrificing a wife during her husband's funeral, but women were usually buried separately, with their jewelry. Some of the dead were given meat and a knife for cutting it. From the 3rd century BC onward, bodies were cremated, which was also the case in all of the Lesser Poland burials. The graves of Celtic warriors (3rd century BC) in Iwanowice, Kraków County, contain a very rich assortment of weapons and ornaments.

The Mount Ślęża formation is believed by many to have been a place of exceptional cult significance, over many centuries, possibly going back all the way to Lusatian times, but especially for Celts. In the early 11th century, chronicler Thietmar of Merseburg describes the mountain as a place of adoration because of its size and the "cursed" pagan ceremonies carried out there. The summits of this and neighboring mountains are circled by standing stones and monumental sculptures. Diagonal cross signs found on many of the stone objects may have their origin in the Hallstatt–Lusatian solar cult. Such signs can also be seen on the massive "monk" sculpture (actually more like a simple chess figure or skittles pin), which was located inside the largest stone ring on Mount Ślęża itself and so is believed to originate from Hallstatt cultural circles. The stone rings also contain fragments of Lusatian ceramics. The younger sculptures ("Maiden with a fish", "Mushroom," and bear figures) have distant counterparts in the Celtic art of the Iberian Peninsula and are thought to be by Celts, who further developed Ślęża as a cultic center. The Mount Ślęża cult was probably revived by the Slavs, who arrived in the early Middle Ages.

== Early Germanic^{[c]} peoples ==
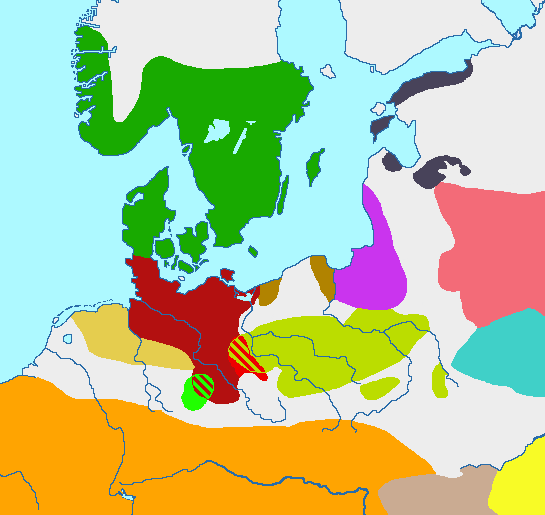
Archaeological cultures of Central Europe in Late Pre-Roman Iron Age: Nordic group House Urns culture Oksywie culture late phase Jastorf culture Gubin group of Jastorf Przeworsk culture Western Balt culture Eastern Balt forest zone cultures Zarubintsy culture Celtic

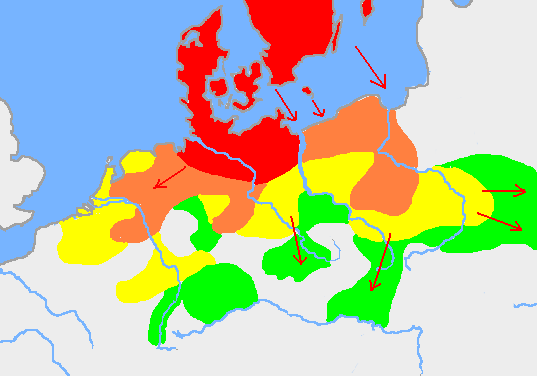
Germanic expansion 750 BC – 1 AD (per Penguin Atlas of World History 1988): Settlements before 750 BC New settlements by 500 BC New settlements by 250 BC New settlements by 1 AD

=== La Tène and Jastorf cultures and their roles ===
Germanic cultures in Poland developed gradually and diversely, beginning with the extant Lusatian and Pomeranian peoples, influenced and augmented first by La Tène Celts, and then by Jastorf tribes, who settled northwestern Poland beginning in the 4th century BC and later migrated southeast through and past the main stretch of Polish lands (mid-3rd century BC and after).^{[a]} The now-disappearing Celts had greatly reshaped central Europe and left a lasting legacy. Their advanced culture catalyzed economic and other progress within the contemporary as well as future populations, which had often had little or no Celtic component. The La Tène archaeological period ended as the Common Era began. The origins of the Germanic people's powerful ascent, leading them to displace the Celts, are not easy to discern. For example, we do not know to what degree Pomeranian culture gave way to Przeworsk culture by internal evolution, external population influx, or just permeation by the new regional cultural trends.

The early Germanic Jastorf cultural sphere was in the beginning an impoverished continuation of the North German Urnfield culture and the Nordic circle cultures. It formed c. 700–550 BC in Northern Germany and Jutland under Hallstatt influence; in its early stages, its funeral customs strongly resembled those of the contemporary Pomeranian culture. From the Jastorf culture, which rapidly expanded from c. 500 BC onward, two groups arose and settled the western borderlands of Poland during 300–100 B: The Oder group in western Pomerania and the Gubin group further south. These groups, which were peripheral to Jastorf culture, very likely originated as Pomeranian culture populations influenced by the Jastorf cultural model. Jastorf communities established large burial grounds, separate for men and women. The dead were cremated and the ashes placed in urns, which were covered by bowls turned upside down. Funeral gifts were modest and rather uniform, indicating a society that was neither affluent nor socially diversified. The Oder and Gubin groups probably included the tribes later called Bastarnae and Sciri in Greek written sources, noted because of their military exploits around Greece and its colonies in the later part of the 3rd century BC. Their route followed the Warta and Noteć rivers, crossed Kujawy and Masovia, turned south along the Bug River, and continued on to what today is Moldavia, where they settled and developed the Poienești-Lukaševka culture. This route is marked by archaeological findings, especially the characteristic bronze crown-shaped necklaces.

=== Oksywie culture and Przeworsk culture ===
It is not clear whether, to what degree, or for what duration some of these traveling Jastorf people settled in Poland. However, their migration, together with the accelerated La Tène influence, catalyzed the emergence of the Oksywie and Przeworsk cultures. Both new cultures were under strong Jastorf influence. The increasingly common presence within the Przeworsk culture area of objects made by Jastorf people reflects the penetration of Jastorf culture into their population. Both the Oksywie and Przeworsk cultures fully used iron processing technologies; unlike their predecessor cultures, they show no regional differentiation.

Oksywie culture (250 BC–30 AD) was named after a village (now within the city of Gdynia) where a burial site was found. It originally occupied the Vistula delta region and then the rest of eastern Pomerania, expanded west up to the Jastorf Oder group area, and in the 1st century BE also included part of what had been that group's territory. Like other cultures of this period, it had basic La Tène cultural characteristics, plus those typical of the Baltic cultures. Oksywie culture ceramics and burial customs indicate strong ties with Przeworsk culture. Men's ashes were placed in well-made black urns with a fine finish and a decorative band. Unlike men's graves in Jastorf culture, theirs were furnished with utensils and weapons, including the typical one-edged sword, and were often covered with or marked by stones. Women's ashes were buried in hollows with feminine personal items. A clay vessel with relief animal images found in Gołębiowo Wielkie in Gdańsk County (2nd half of 1st century BC) is among the finest in all of the Germanic cultural zone.

Przeworsk culture was named after a town in Lesser Poland, near which another burial ground was found. Like Oksywie, it originated c. 250 BC, but it lasted much longer. It went through many changes, formed tribal and political structures, fought wars (including with the Romans), until in the 5th century AD its highly developed society of farmers, artisans, warriors, and chiefs succumbed to the temptations of the lands of the now-fallen empire. (For many of them it possibly happened rather quickly, in the first half of that century.).

Przeworsk culture initially became established in Lower Silesia, Greater Poland, central Poland, and western Masovia and Lesser Poland, gradually replacing (from west to east) Pomeranian culture and Cloche Grave culture. It coexisted with these older cultures for a while (in some cases well into the younger pre-Roman period, 200–0 BC) and assimilated some of their characteristics, such as Cloche Grave funerary practice and ceramics. The Przeworsk people must have originated from the above two local cultures, because of the lack of any other archaeologically viable possibility, but their different cremation rite and pottery style represent a striking cultural discontinuity from their predecessors.

In the 2nd and 1st centuries BC (late La Tène), the Przeworsk people followed the lead of the more advanced Celts, who had established population enclaves in southern and middle Poland. Przeworsk culture developed as a result of the local populations' adoption of La Tène culture models. The passage of the Bastarnae and Sciri and the associated unrest likely functioned as the outside catalyzing agent; Jastorf culture archaeological material has been found in pre-Przeworsk artifact assemblages and in some of the early Przeworsk range. The Przeworsk people mastered and implemented the various achievements of the Celts, most importantly developing large-scale production of iron, for which they used local bog ores. They sometimes formed mixed groups and cooperated within common settlements with the Celts, of which the Tyniec group in the Kraków region and another group in Kujawy are the best-known examples. Arms, clothes, and ornaments were patterned after Celtic products. In the early stages of their culture, the Przeworsk people displayed no social distinctions; their graves were alike and flat, and ashes were usually buried together with funeral gifts and without urns. Religious practices of pagan Germanic peoples included offering ceremonies performed in swamps, involving manmade objects, produce, farm animals, or even human sacrifice, as was the case at one site near Słowikowo in Słupca County and another in Otalążka, Grójec County. Dog burials within or around a homestead were another form of protective offering.

As the Celtic domination in this part of Europe was coming to an end and the Roman Empire's borders had gotten much closer, the Przeworsk people were being subjected to the Greco-Roman world's influence with a rapidly growing intensity.

== Cultures and tribes in Roman times ==
=== Early Roman wars and movement of tribes ===
Much circumstantial evidence points to the participation of Germanic people from Polish lands in the events of the first half of the 1st century BC, which culminated in Gaul in 58 BC, as related in Caesar's Commentarii de Bello Gallico. At the time the Suebi tribal confederation led by Ariovistus arrived in Gaul, a rapid decrease of settlement density can be observed in the areas of the upper and middle Oder River basin. In fact, the Gubin group of Jastorf culture then disappeared entirely, which may indicate that the group identified with one of the Suebi tribes. Also vacated were the western areas of Przeworsk culture (Lower Silesia, Lubusz Land and western Greater Poland), the probable original territory of the tribes accompanying the Suebi. Burial sites and artifacts characteristic of Przeworsk culture have been found in Saxony, Thuringia, and Hesse, along the route of the Suebi offensive. The abovementioned regions of western Poland were not repopulated and economically redeveloped until the 2nd century CE.

As a result of the Roman efforts to subjugate all of Germania, the member tribes of the Suebi alliance were displaced, moved east, conquered the Celtic tribes who stood in their way, and settled: the Quadi in Moravia, the Marcomanni in Bohemia. The latter tribe, under Marbod, formed a quasi-state with a huge army and was able to conquer, among others, the Lugii tribal association. What archaeologists see as the Przeworsk culture by this period (early 1st century CE) is believed to consist primarily of the Lugii, described by Tacitus as a very large union of tribes. The Roman defeat at the Battle of the Teutoburg Forest (9 CE) stabilized the situation at the periphery of the Empire to some degree. Through Marcomanni and Quadi intermediaries, the Lugii and other tribes on Polish lands increasingly became involved in trade and other contacts with the Danubian provinces of Rome. In 50 CE they invaded and pillaged the Quadi state created by Vannius, contributing to its fall. The catalyst for the expedition was rumors of the enormous riches that Vannius had accumulated by plunder and by charging duties. In 93 CE the Lugii, asked Emperor Domitian for help in their war against the Suebi and received 100 mounted soldiers.

=== Amber Road ===
Operations of the ancient Amber Road, a trans-European, north–south amber trade route, continued and intensified during the Roman Empire. From the 1st century BC the Amber Road connected the Baltic Sea shores and Aquileia, an important amber processing center. This route was controlled first by the Celts, later by the Romans south of the Danube, and then by Germanic tribes north of that river. It was used for transporting a variety of traded merchandise (and slaves) besides amber. As told in Naturalis Historia by Pliny the Elder, during the reign of Nero an equestrian of unknown name led an expedition to the Baltic shorelines and returned to Rome with huge quantity of amber, which was subsequently used for propagandist purposes during gladiator matches and other public games. The infrastructure of the Amber Road was destroyed by Germanic and Sarmatian attacks in the second half of the 3rd century CE, although it was still intermittently used until the mid-6th century. The Przeworsk culture sites provide a rich assortment of objects traded along the Amber Road.

=== Gustow and Lubusz groups ===
From the beginning of the Common Era until 140 CE, two local groups existed in northwest Poland. The Gustow group (named after Gustow on Rügen) lived in the area settled in the past by the Oder group. To the south, by the middle section of the Oder River (the area previously inhabited by the Gubin group), lived the Lubusz group. These two groups were intermediary between the Elbe cultural circle to the west and the Przeworsk and Wielbark cultures to the east (Wielbark replaced Oksywie culture after 30 CE).

=== Przeworsk culture settlements and burial sites ===
The Przeworsk people of the earlier Roman period lived in small, unprotected villages. Each village had a few dozen residents at most, living in several houses, each of which covered an area of 8–22 m^{2} and was usually set partly below ground level (semi-sunken). Because Przeworsk people had wells, settlements did not need to be near bodies of water. Thirteen 2nd-century-CE wells of various construction with timber-lined walls have been found at a settlement in Stanisławice, Bochnia County. Fields were used for crop cultivation for a while and then as pastures, as animal manure helped refertilize the depleted soil. Once iron plowshares were introduced, Przeworsk fields alternated between tillage and grazing.

Several or more settlements made up a micro-region within which the residents cooperated economically and buried their dead in a common cemetery. Each micro-region was separated from other micro-regions by forests and barren land. A number of such micro-regions possibly made up a tribe, with tribes separated by empty space, which Tacitus called zones "of mutual fear." However, tribes would at times form larger confederations, such as temporary alliances for waging wars or even early forms of states, especially if they were culturally closely related.

A Przeworsk culture turn-of-the-millennium industrial complex for the extraction of salt from salt springs was discovered in Chabsko near Mogilno.

Examinations of Przeworsk burial grounds, of which even the largest was used continuously over periods of up to several centuries, have turned up no more than several hundred graves, showing that overall population density was low.^{[b]} The dead were cremated and the ashes sometimes placed into urns with central engraved bulges. In the 1st century CE, this design was replaced with a horizontal ridge around the circumference of the urn, which produced a sharp profile.

In Siemiechów, a grave of a warrior who must have taken part in the Ariovistus expedition (70–50 BC) was found; it contains Celtic weapons, a helmet manufactured in the Alpine region that was used as the warrior's burial urn, and local ceramics. Burial gifts were often, for unknown reasons, bent or broken and then burned with the body. The burials range from "poor" to "rich," the latter supplied with costly Celtic and then Roman imports, reflecting the considerable social stratification that had developed by then.

=== Wielbark culture and burials ===
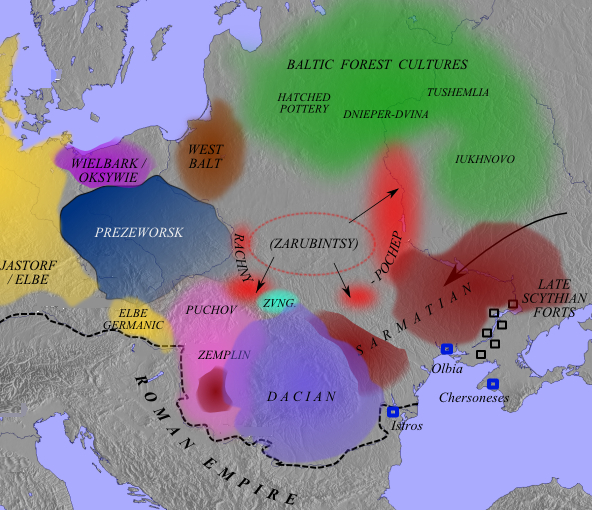
Central and East European cultures c. 100 CE

Wielbark culture, named after Wielbark in Malbork County where a large cemetery was found, replaced Oksywie culture in Pomerania rather suddenly across its entire territory. While Oksywie culture was closely related to Przeworsk culture, its successor Wielbark culture shows only minimal contacts with the Przeworsk areas, indicating clear tribal and geographical separation. Wielbark culture lasted on Polish lands from 30 to 400 CE, although most of its people left Poland long before the latter date. Some of this culture's burials are skeletal; the dead were inhumed in solid log coffins, while others were cremated; both such graves were identically equipped. Cremated remains were either placed in urns or simply buried in hollows. Burial gifts did not include weapons or tools. They did include clay vessels, decorations, personal ornaments, and — if the deceased had been wealthy enough to own a horse — spurs. These various items, and especially the 1st and 2nd century CE jewelry made of bronze, silver, and gold, are works of the highest quality, surpassing the comparable products of the Przeworsk culture. This craftsmanship reached its apex with 2nd-century "Baroque" jewelry, beautiful by any standard, that was placed in the graves of women in (as the Wielbark culture expanded south) Poznań Szeląg and Kowalewko, Oborniki County, among other places.

The Kowalewko cemetery in Greater Poland is one of the largest Wielbark burial sites in Poland and is distinguished by a great number of beautiful relics, made locally or imported from the Empire. The total number of burials is estimated to exceed 500, most of which have been excavated. Sixty percent of bodies were not cremated but were typically placed in wooden coffins made of boards or planks. The burial ground was in use from the mid-1st century CE to about 220, meaning that approximately 80 local residents of each generation were inhumed there. Remnants of settlements in the region have also been investigated. At Rogowo near Chełmno, a Wielbark settlement, an industrial production site and a 2nd-to-3rd-century bi-ritual cemetery with very richly furnished graves have been discovered. In the area of Ulkowy, Gdańsk County, a settlement consisting of sunken floors and post-construction dwellings has been found, as well as a burial ground in use from the mid-1st century to the second half of the 3rd century. Only part of the cemetery was excavated on the occasion of a motorway construction, but it yielded 110 inhumations (11 in hollowed-out log coffins) and 15 cremations (eight of them in urns) with a rich collection of decorative objects, mostly from the graves of women. Those include fancy jewelry and accessories made of gold, silver, bronze, amber, glass, and enamel. Ceramics, utility items, and tools, including weaving equipment, were recovered from the settlement site. Other significant Wielbark settlements in the area were encountered in Swarożyn and Stanisławie, both in Tczew County.

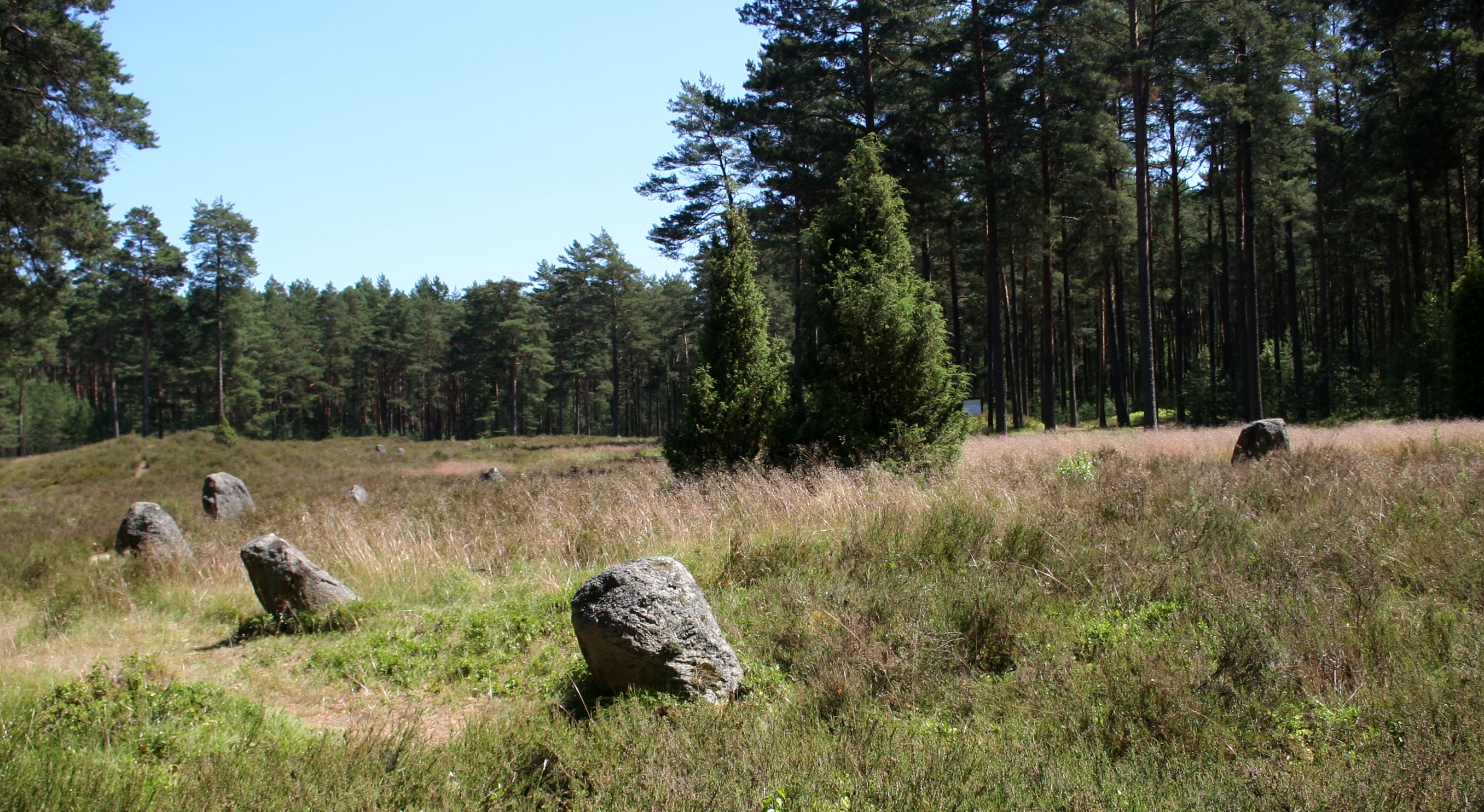
Stone circle in Odry

Many Wielbark graves were flat, but kurgans are also characteristic and common. In the case of kurgans, the grave was covered with stones, which were surrounded by a circle of larger stones. These were covered with earth and a solitary stone or stela often put on top. Such a kurgan could include one or several individual burials, have a diameter of up to a dozen or so meters, and be up to 1 meter high. Some burial grounds feature large stone circles of massive boulders up to 1.7 meters high, separated by several meters of spaces, sometimes connected by smaller stones; the whole structure is 10–40 meters in diameter. In the middle of the circles, one to four stelae were placed, and sometimes a single grave. The stone circles are believed to be the locations of meetings of Scandinavian (see below) tings (assemblies or courts). The single graves inside the circles are probably those of human sacrifices meant to propitiate the gods and assure their support for the deliberations. A stone kurgan cemetery was found in Węsiory, Kartuzy County; another burial site with 10 large stone circles was discovered in Odry, Chojnice County, both dated 2nd century CE.

=== Origins and expansion of the Wielbark culture ===
How did Wielbark culture arise, and why did it so immediately replace Oksywie culture? According to the legend quoted in The Origin and Deeds of the Goths by the 6th-century Gothic historian Jordanes, the ancestors of that Germanic tribe arrived from Scandinavia (under King Berig) in two boats and landed on the South Baltic shores, followed by a third boat carrying the ancestors of the Gepids. Supposedly they conquered the native people of that region, and then, some years later (under King Filimer, the fifth one counting from Berig), continued their migration toward the Black Sea. This story, which was dismissed by past historians, is now seen as containing basic elements of the true sequence of events, and the Wielbark culture is indeed partly identified with the Germanic ancestors of the Goths. The idea that a culturally different (although related) people arrived in the mouth of the Vistula, mixed with the Oksywie population, and came to dominate it due to their (cultural, at least) advancement is not at odds with the state of archaeological findings and could explain the change of cultures in Pomerania around 30 CE.

Archaeology nevertheless shows the evolution of Oksywie culture to be the fundamental source of Wielbark culture, as the two cultures extended over exactly the same territory and continuously used the same cemeteries. The locally present Veneti and Rugians became influenced by the Goths or their Scandinavian predecessors. It is presently believed that the Scandinavian arrivals directly settled the areas where the great cult kurgan and stone burial grounds are found. They are referred to as the Odry-Węsiory-Grzybnica type, were established in the second half of the 1st century CE and occur in parts of Pomerania west of the Vistula, up to the Koszalin area. The contemporary and rather closely related Wielbark culture in (previously settled by the Przeworsk culture) Greater Poland, represented by the Kowalewko cemetery, lacks however for the most part the kurgans and the stone structures. The Wielbark people came here from Pomerania.

In the course of the 1st and 2nd century CE the Wielbark culture expanded south, towards Greater Poland and Masovia, partially at the expense of the Przeworsk culture. Around the mid-1st century the Wielbark culture people forced out the Przeworsk population from northern Greater Poland and settled the area for about 150 years. The Przeworsk culture itself also expanded in the southern, eastern and south-western directions.

== "Barbarians", Late Roman Empire and the Great Migration of Peoples ==
=== Marcomannic Wars and movement of tribes ===
The Marcomannic Wars (166–180 CE) were caused by the pressure exerted by the northern Germanic peoples (settled around what is now Poland) on the tribes in the vicinity of Roman limes, the Empire's defended border. Expansion of the Proto-Gothic Wielbark culture displaced from northern Greater Poland and Masovia the Przeworsk culture people; they in turn, moving south and east, crossed the Carpathian Mountains in the third quarter of the 2nd century. The ethnic composition of the Przeworsk population at this stage is not known, as the Lugii tribes no longer seem to be mentioned. Related to the Przeworsk culture was the Wietrzno-Solina type, a cultural unit with Celtic and then Dacian elements, in the more eastern part of the Beskids range (San River basin) during the 100–250 AD period. The Kotins tribe Celtic survivors with their Púchov culture disappeared now for good, as a result of their migration and involvement in the Marcomannic Wars. There were also changes in northwest Poland, on the border of the Elbe cultural sphere region. The Lubusz group there was absorbed by the new Luboszyce culture (Luboszyce, Lubusz Voivodeship), that occupied the middle Oder basin in 140–430 CE. Its birth was related to the arrival from the east of population groups strongly influenced by the Przeworsk and Wielbark cultures. Gradually a new branch of Germanic people, the Burgundians, whose origins are traced back to Scandinavia and Bornholm island in particular and whose ancestors then migrated to the northwest Przework culture area, developed and evolved under new favorable conditions here. On the other hand, the Gustow group left western Pomerania, to be replaced after 70 years by the Dębczyn group (Dębczyn, Wschowa County), established by the arrivals from the Elbe cultures and lasting between 210 and 450 AD.

=== Economic development and currency ===
The economic development of what to the Romans were barbarian lands (also called "Barbaricum", regions populated mostly by Germanic peoples, north and northeast of the Empire) benefited greatly from the skills of the prisoners taken during the protracted Marcomannic Wars, Roman legionaries and craftsmen, some of whom undoubtedly stayed beyond the limes and made their contribution there. Contacts with the wealthy Danubian Roman provinces during the wars were also quite active and intensive. Because of all that, from the end of the 2nd century CE on, the Roman-originated and based technical expertise and inventions were becoming increasingly widespread within the Germanic societies. For example, besides traditional houses supported by pillars, framework houses were being built, lathe machines were used for amber and other jewelry work. The barbarian societies were getting more wealthy and, especially during the last centuries of imperial Rome, more socially polarized.

An estimated 70,000 Roman coins from all periods were found in Poland, starting with the 2nd century BC silver denarii. A treasure of these and other coins, some as early as the 1st century CE, was found in Połaniec, Staszów County, probably a booty captured c. 19 CE from King Marbod of the Marcomanni. Greater waves of Roman money found their way to Poland throughout the 1st and 2nd centuries and then again during the 4th and 5th centuries, this time as bronze and golden solidi. The barbarians did not use them for commerce; they were being accumulated in dynastic treasuries of rulers and occasionally used for ceremonial gift exchange. The chiefs also kept large golden Roman medallions or their local imitations. The largest barbarian medallion, an equivalent of 48 solidii, is a part of the gold and silver treasure found in Zagórzyn near Kalisz.

=== Princely burials ===
The evolution of the power structure within the Germanic societies in Poland and elsewhere can be traced to some degree by examining the "princely" graves - burials of chiefs, and even hereditary princes, as the consolidation of power progressed. Those appear from the beginning of the Common Era and are located away from ordinary cemeteries, singly or in small groups. The bodies were inhumed in wooden coffins and covered with kurgans, or interred in wooden or stone chambers. Luxurious Roman-made gifts and fancy barbarian emulations (such as silver and gold clasps with springs, created with an unsurpassed attention to detail, dated 3rd century CE from Wrocław Zakrzów), but not weapons, were placed in the graves. The 1st and 2nd century burials of this type, occurring all the way from Jutland to Lesser Poland, are referred to as prince graves of the Lubieszewo group, after Lubieszewo, Gryfice County in western Pomerania, where six such burials were found. Two types of 3rd- and 4th-century princely graves are distinguished: The Zakrzów type, named after the location of three very rich stone chamber burials found in Wrocław Zakrzów occur in southern Poland, while in the northern and central parts of the country the Rostołty (Białystok County) type kurgans are rather common. At some sites, believed to be dynastic necropolises, the princes were buried in generation long time increments. During the late Roman period the princely burials are fewer in number, but they get increasingly more elaborate.

=== Ceramics and metallurgy ===
The pottery as well as iron mining and processing industries kept developing in Poland throughout the Roman periods, until terminated in the 5th century or so by the Great Migration. Clay pots were still often formed manually and these were more crude, while the better ones were made with the potter's wheel, used beginning in the early 3rd century. Some had inscriptions engraved, but their meaning, if any, is not known (Germanic people had occasionally used the runic alphabets). Wide-open, vase type Przeworsk culture urn from the 2nd century CE found in Biała, Zgierz County is covered with representations from Celtic and Germanic mythology, such as deer, horse riders, crosses and swastikas. The 3rd and 4th century buckets were made of wood and reinforced with bronze braces and sheets. Przeworsk culture's large globular clay storage containers from the 3rd and 4th century were 60 cm to over one meter tall. The 4th and 5th century ceramic specimens from the late phase of this culture include pitchers, clay pails, beakers and bowls.

Characteristic of the Roman times iron industry were huge centers of metallurgy. One such concentration of ironworks, in Świętokrzyskie Mountains, which already produced iron on an industrial scale in the 1st century CE, in the 2nd and 3rd centuries became Barbaricum's largest. It may have been responsible for the majority of the iron supplied for barbarian weapon production during the Marcomannic Wars. The iron product was obtained in rather small, single-use smelting furnaces. One furnace's iron output was from a few to 20 kg, which required 10 to 200 kg of ore and the same amount of charcoal. The satisfaction of so much need for charcoal caused significant deforestation of the areas surrounding the iron centers. Not only turf, but also hematite ores were utilized, which involved building mines and shafts to provide access. The furnaces in Świętokrzyskie Mountains were grouped into large complexes, located in forested areas, away from human settlements. There could have had been as many as 700,000 smelting furnaces built in that area; one big concentration of the Przeworsk culture's spent furnaces (2nd–3rd centuries) was located in Nowa Słupia, Kielce County. The second largest iron production center functioned at that time in Masovia, west of Warsaw, with the total number of furnaces there, in which only turf ores were used, estimated at up to 200,000. They were operated as very large complexes, with several thousand furnaces at a time located near populated areas, where intermediate products were processed further. Those two great concentrations of metallurgical industry produced iron largely for long-distance trade; to fulfill local requirements and on smaller scale iron was obtained at a number of other locations.

Graves of warrior-smiths buried with weapons and sets of tools were found, which suggests that they belonged to the societal upper ranks and were held in high esteem.

=== Weapons and tools ===
A set of iron carpenter's tools from the 3rd-4th century, including a compass for marking circles, was found in Przywóz, Wieluń County, where there was a Przeworsk culture settlement and a 2nd/3rd century dynastic burial complex. The graves of Przeworsk men typically include substantial collections of arms, so that their warrior's battle equipment and its evolution are well known. Less wealthy warriors fought typically on foot, with spears (for close range combat) and javelins (for throwing), both with iron heads. The better off fighters used swords, first of the long Celtic kind, and then in the 1st and 2nd century CE of the short and broad, gladius Roman infantry type. Swords were kept in scabbards, some of which, depending on status, were very ornate. The long and narrow swords, better suited for horseback combat, became popular again in the 3rd century, but only the more wealthy warriors had horses, not to mention iron helmets or ring armor. Round wooden shields had iron umbos in the middle, usually with a thorn for piercing the enemy. There were no saddles, but the richest of horsemen used silver spurs and bronze bridles with chain reins. Numerous Przeworsk culture objects including spurs and a unique silver belt buckle were recovered at the Aleksandrowice, Kraków County settlement area; some relics there are dated possibly as late as the first half of the 6th century.

=== Migrations of Wielbark and Przeworsk cultures people ===
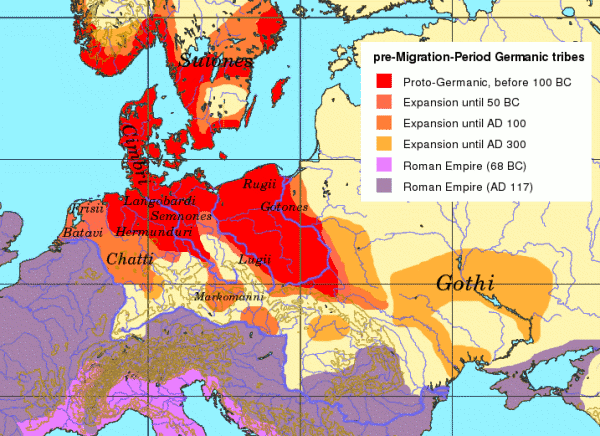
Germanic expansion

In the 2nd century CE the Proto-Goths of the Wielbark culture began their own great migration, moving east, south, and southeast. In the first half of the 3rd century they left most of Pomerania except for the lower Vistula region, where a small Wielbark population remained; Pomerania west of there became mostly settled by the Dębczyn group. Also evacuated at that time northern Greater Poland was retaken by the Przeworsk culture people. The Wielbark people successively took over eastern Masovia, Lesser Poland, Podlasie, Polesie and Volhynia. They settled in Ukraine, where they encountered other peoples, which resulted in the early 3rd century CE in the rise of the Chernyakhov culture. This last culture, which in the 4th century encompassed large areas of southeastern Europe, was of mixed ethnic composition; in the more western part it was made-up of the Wielbark culture people, as well as other Germanic people and the Dacians. It was within the Chernyakhov culture that the Gothic tribes assumed their mature form.

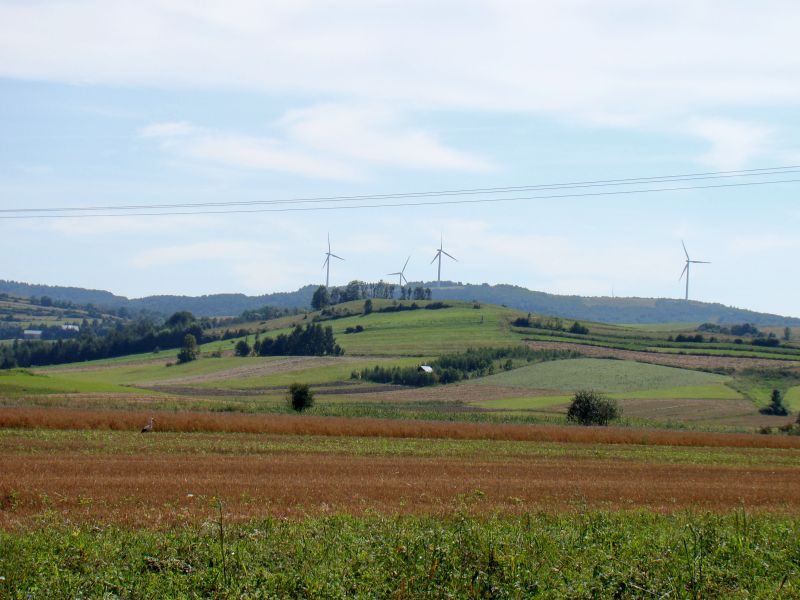
Vandalic burial cemetery in Prusiek, Poland

The Przeworsk people were for the most part also moving (to a lesser extent) south and east, which by the 4th century caused a lessening of the population density in northern and central Poland with a simultaneous settlement concentration increases in Lesser Poland and Silesia. The Przeworsk people there at this point in time are often identified with the Vandals Germanic tribe. The 4th and 5th century Przeworsk societies had to cope with a deterioration of their traditional tribal social structure, caused by the accumulation of wealth and influence in the hands of the rich, the warriors, the tribal elders and rulers, who controlled the trade, imposed contributions and plundered. During these two centuries the number of the Przeworsk culture settlements and cemeteries generally decreases. There are also clear signs of the environment being overly exploited, which provided another motivation for the population to gradually leave. Most burials were getting more poorly equipped, in comparison with the previous periods. Late Przeworsk culture ceramic materials from Greater Poland show impoverishment and lack of differentiation of form, but on the other hand metal 5th century clasps, found at a variety of locations from Eastern Lesser Poland, through eastern Greater Poland to Kujawy, demonstrate the usual for mature Germanic societies highest quality of workmanship.

=== Hun advance, barbarian migrations in Europe ===
On top of the Przeworsk culture's internal crisis situation came external pressures, namely the massive migration of peoples. Around 370 CE, the Huns crossed the Volga River, defeating the Alans and then the Ostrogoths, causing in 375 the fall of their state located in the Black Sea shores region. This unleashed a domino effect, as various Germanic peoples moved west and south to avoid the danger. The Visigoths and others retreated, forcing further migrations, while the weakness of the Roman Empire encouraged encroachments of its territory, the whole scenario resulting in the fall of its western part. The paths of this Great Migration of Peoples led in part through the Polish lands, and the Germanic tribes living here joined the movement themselves, with the result of an almost complete, in the course of the 5th century, depopulation of Poland.

In the upper Vistula basin, where the Przeworsk culture settlements were still relatively dense in the first half of the 5th century, they are markedly absent during the second half of it. This is also the case in Silesia; the depopulation pattern began there earlier and the latest finds are dated around 400 CE. All of it agrees well with the information given by Procopius of Caesarea, according to whom the Heruli returning to Scandinavia from the Carpathian Basin in 512, heading towards the Varni tribe area in Germany, crossed a large region devoid of human settlements - presumably Silesia and Lusatia. Likewise there are no settlements found in Masovia and Podlasie beyond the early part of the 5th century. On the other hand, in central Poland and Greater Poland isolated remnants from the Roman era cultures continue to be located through the end of 5th and even into the earlier parts of the 6th century. Still further north, in Pomerania, such findings are actually quite numerous, including many cult coin deposit sites (Roman and then Byzantine golden solidi). There, the Germanic groups lasted the longest (and kept up trade and other contacts with their brethren elsewhere).

The territory of the powerful confederation of the Hun tribes included about 400 CE the lands of southern Poland, where burial and treasure sites have been investigated. A woman's grave in Jędrzychowice, Strzelin County contained fancy feminine ornaments and a nicely preserved bronze kettle, which gave a name ("Jędrzychowice") to one of the two basic Hun kettle types, while a burial of a young warrior-aristocrat including his horse and precious harness, attire and weaponry elements (gold sheet covered ritual bow and sword sheath) was found in Jakuszowice, Kazimierza Wielka County. Still further east, in Świlcza near Rzeszów a hidden Hun treasure was located; this last find dates from the mid-5th century, when the Hun empire was about to crumble.

== Baltic peoples ==
=== Early Balts in light of ancient sources and linguistic research ===
The Balts or Baltic peoples, or their Indo-European predecessors, have settled (at different times different parts of) the territory of today's northeast Poland as well as the lands located further north and east, generally east of the lower Vistula River, the Baltic seashore north of there including and past the Sambian peninsula, and the inland area east of the above regions (some of their ancestors came from as far east as the upper Oka River), from the early Iron Age. The analysis of the Baltic historic range has been aided by the studies of their characteristic toponyms and hydronyms, in addition to the examination of the archaeological record and the few ancient written sources.

Herodotus wrote of the Neuri tribe, who lived beyond the Scythians and to the north of whom the land was uninhabited as far as he knew.

Of the Baltic tribes may have written Pliny the Elder and Ptolemy when they spoke of the Veneti, Venedi or Venedai people. Pliny in Natural History locates them in the mouth of the Vistula region, while Ptolemy in Geographia just east of the lower Vistula along the Bay of Gdańsk. The Western Baltic Veneti's territory may have reached east all the way to Sambia. Tacitus in Germania, describing (possibly the same) inhabitants of the south-eastern Baltic shores, mentioned the Aesti people, involved in collecting amber not for their own use but for long-distance trade in a raw state. Jordanes in Getica speaks of the "Aesti, who dwell on the farthest shore of the German Ocean" (beyond the Germanic-named Vidivarii people, who occupied the mouth of the Vistula area). This "Ocean" he defines as where the floods of the Vistula empty, the Baltic Sea. Various versions of the Aesti name were used later for various purposes; in particular that's what in the 9th century the Baltic Old Prussian people were called and their country was then referred to as Aestland.

Ptolemy in Geographia gives the names of two Baltic tribes: "Galindai" and "Soudinoi", which he localized east of the lower Vistula, some distance from the sea, just about where the Baltic Galindians (in Masuria), and the Sudovians or Yotvingians east of the Galindians lived a thousand years later.

According to linguistic sources, the Baltic tribes precursors appeared first inland, in the forest zone regions far from the sea, and only later settled the near Baltic Sea areas, extending from the northeastern part of the Vistula basin to the Daugava River basin. This westbound expansion resulted in the establishment of the two main Baltic branches: The Western Balts, represented by the extinct Old Prussians and Yotvingians, and the Eastern Balts including the modern nations of Lithuanians and Latvians.

=== Western Balt culture ===
The Western Baltic Kurgans culture, which resulted from the interaction between groups arriving from the east and the people living in the Masuria-Sambia region (mid-1st millennium BC) is discussed in the Bronze and Iron Age Poland article, within its time frame. The process of separation and differentiation of the eastern and western Baltic tribes deepened during the period of Roman influence, when the economy, culture, and customs of the Western Balts became increasingly influenced by the more highly developed Przeworsk and Wielbark cultures. From the beginning of the Common Era we can speak of the Western Balt culture, which included several distinct groups of the Western Baltic cultural circle and can definitely be connected with the Baltic peoples.

Beginning in the 1st century AD, the Western Balts experienced their "golden" period — times of economic expansion and increased affluence of their societies, all of which was based on the amber trade, resulting in active and long-term contacts with the lands of the Roman Empire. As late as the early 6th century AD, an Aesti mission arrived in Italy at the court of King Theodoric the Great of the Ostrogoths with gifts of amber. As elsewhere, with wealth came imported and locally manufactured luxury items, social stratification, and an emergence of the "princely" class, whose status was reflected in their burials.

=== Baltic settlements, economy, crafts, and burials ===
The Balts grew various grains, beans, and peas, but despite the advent of iron-reinforced plows and other new agricultural technologies, the regional environmental conditions set limits on the practicality and extent of land tillage. By contrast, the dense forest coverage facilitated gathering and was more amenable to the raising of livestock. The latter included all of the major species of farm animals, including in particular the small forest horse ('Equus caballus germanicus'). The horses constituted an important element of the Baltic tribes' culture: men of high socioeconomic status were often buried with their horses, and even with costly equestrian gear.

Baltic settlements were mainly small, family-based communities, often forming small clusters separated by uninhabited areas. However, some settlements were larger and remained in use over many generations. While they lacked artificial fortifications, they were often raised in natural settings that were easily defended. One rather large dwelling place, which was in use from the 2nd to the 4th century, was discovered and investigated in Osowo, Gołdap County (near Suwałki). The living quarters were pillar-supported houses, while the farming infrastructure included 80 grain storage caves.

Small fortified refuges were built to a limited extent beginning at the end of the 4th century, but Western Balts did not build larger-scale fortified settlements until the Middle Ages.

The dominant funereal custom was cremation, with ashes placed in urns that were either ceramic or made from organic materials such as textiles or leather. In the large cemeteries built along the seashore and covered by stone pavement, graves were flat. However, there were also single graves accompanied by stone structures/kurgans, as in the skeletal burials from the 1st and 2nd centuries AD that have been found in Sambia and the later ones (3rd–4th centuries) in Sudovia. From about 400 AD onward, cremation became the only means of corpse disposition, and the more familiar type of kurgan emerged, with each grave holding the remains of several persons.

Samples of mature ancient-Baltic craftsmanship (2nd–4th century) have been found in places such as Żywa Woda and Szwajcaria, both in Suwałki County; and in Augustów County. The princely graves, as is typical, also contain many imports from southern and western Europe. Baltic fine bronze ornamental items, such as thin, open-worked plates for necklace clasps, were typically coated with colored, often red enamel. Foreign influence can also be seen in the designs of clay urns, such as the 3rd- or 4th-century Greek kernos-type vessel with additional miniature urns attached, or the 5th-century "window" container with a square opening from Olsztyn County, similar to the urns found in Denmark and northwestern Germany.

=== Olsztyn group ===
The last-mentioned specimen comes from the Olsztyn group burial ground in Tumiany. The Olsztyn group represents the late phase of the Western Baltic cultural circle, originating in the second half of the 5th century and reaching its height in the 6th and 7th centuries. It was located in Masuria, partially in areas vacated by the Wielbark culture people. This group is believed to have been established by branches of the Galindian tribe, including a part that migrated to southern Europe and then returned to the Baltic area. Its cemeteries contain horse burials and many plate clasps, buckles, connectors, and other objects made of bronze, silver, and gold, studded with semi-precious stones and decorated with engravings. These sophisticated artifacts demonstrate the Olsztyn group people's extensive interregional and far-reaching trade and other relationships and contacts with the peoples of Scandinavia and western, southern, and southeastern Europe.

=== Migrations and their effects on Baltic people ===
In the 5th century, due to Migration Period population shifts and the pressure from the westbound movement of the Slavic peoples, patterns of Baltic settlement began to change. The Western Balts took over the lands left by the Wielbark culture people and reached the eastern part of the mouth of the Vistula. A major trade route connecting the southeastern Baltic areas with the Black Sea shores went now through the regions controlled by the Balts. Expansion of the Old Prussian tribes, such as the previously mentioned Galindians and Yotvingians, encompassed today's northeast Poland and the adjacent territories further north. Galindia (today's western Masuria), whose new inhabitants included the Olsztyn group, became in the 6th and 7th centuries the most affluent of the lands settled by Balts, with highly developed local craftsmanship supplementing the wealth of items brought from distant countries.

This westbound expansion was accompanied by retreat at the southeastern bounds of the Baltic range caused by the advance of the Slavs, the Balts' closest ethnolinguistic relatives. A majority of the Baltic peoples, whose population at the end of the first millennium AD is estimated at 480,000, became extinct during the later Middle Ages due to attempts at forced Christianization, conquest and extermination, or assimilation (Slavicisation), the Old Prussians being the primary example. Lithuanians and Latvians are the sole surviving Baltic peoples.

== See also ==
- Prehistory of Poland (until 966)
- Stone Age Poland
- Bronze and Iron Age Poland
- Poland in the Early Middle Ages

== Notes ==
a. The Lusatian and Pomeranian people, or their linguistic predecessors, may have belonged to the hypothetical Old European languages group (pre-Indo-European), the probable source of the names of many European rivers. Their descendants possibly constituted the bulk of the Przeworsk culture population in its early stages. Kaczanowski, Kozłowski, p. 348

b. This would appear to contradict the "countless multitude" of Lugii warriors, as seen by Tacitus.

c. "Germanic" identification is used here as a broad approximation. The article deals with archaeological cultures whose ethnic and linguistic identifications are often unknown or uncertain.

== Bibliography ==
- Piotr Kaczanowski, Janusz Krzysztof Kozłowski - Najdawniejsze dzieje ziem polskich (do VII w.) (Oldest history of Polish lands (until the 7th century)), Fogra, Kraków 1998, ISBN 83-85719-34-2.
- Kleineberg, A.; Marx, Ch.; Knobloch, E.; Lelgemann D.: Germania und die Insel Thule. Die Entschlüsselung von Ptolemaios' "Atlas der Oikumene". WBG 2010. ISBN 978-3-534-23757-9.
- Various authors, ed. Marek Derwich and Adam Żurek, U źródeł Polski (do roku 1038) (Foundations of Poland (until year 1038)), Wydawnictwo Dolnośląskie, Wrocław 2002, ISBN 83-7023-954-4.
