= Przeworsk culture =

Iron Age culture in Poland

- Geographical range: Poland
- Period: Iron Age
- Dates: c. 250 BC – c. 400
- Preceded by: Pomeranian culture Jastorf culture
- Followed by: Kiev culture Chernyakhov culture Prague-Korchak culture Sukow-Dziedzice culture

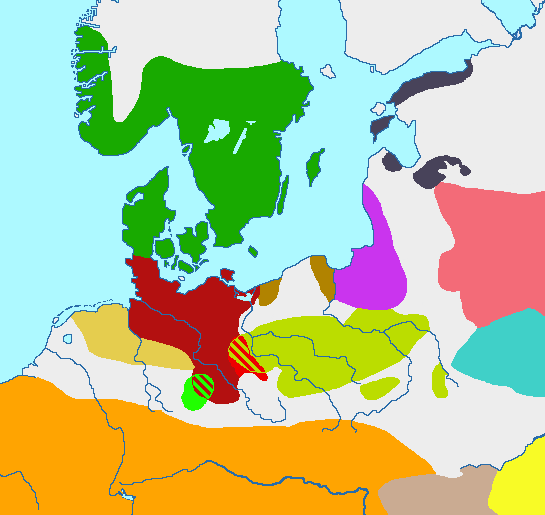
Przeworsk culture marked in light 'olive' green.

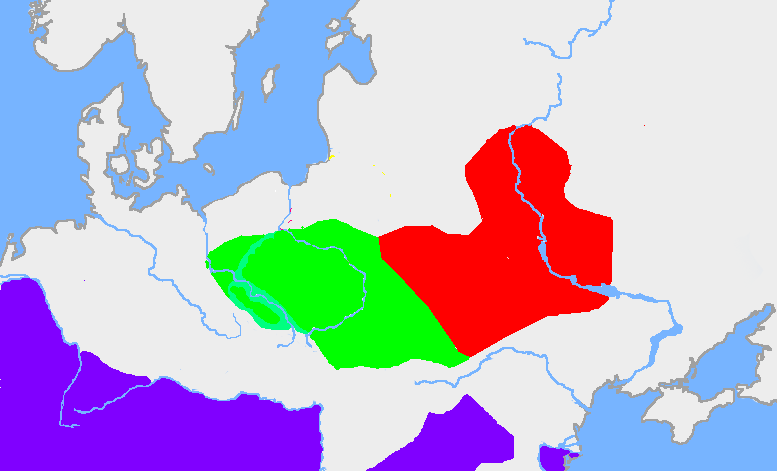
Approximate locations of Przeworsk culture (green) and Zarubintsy culture (red) in proximity to the Roman Empire (purple)

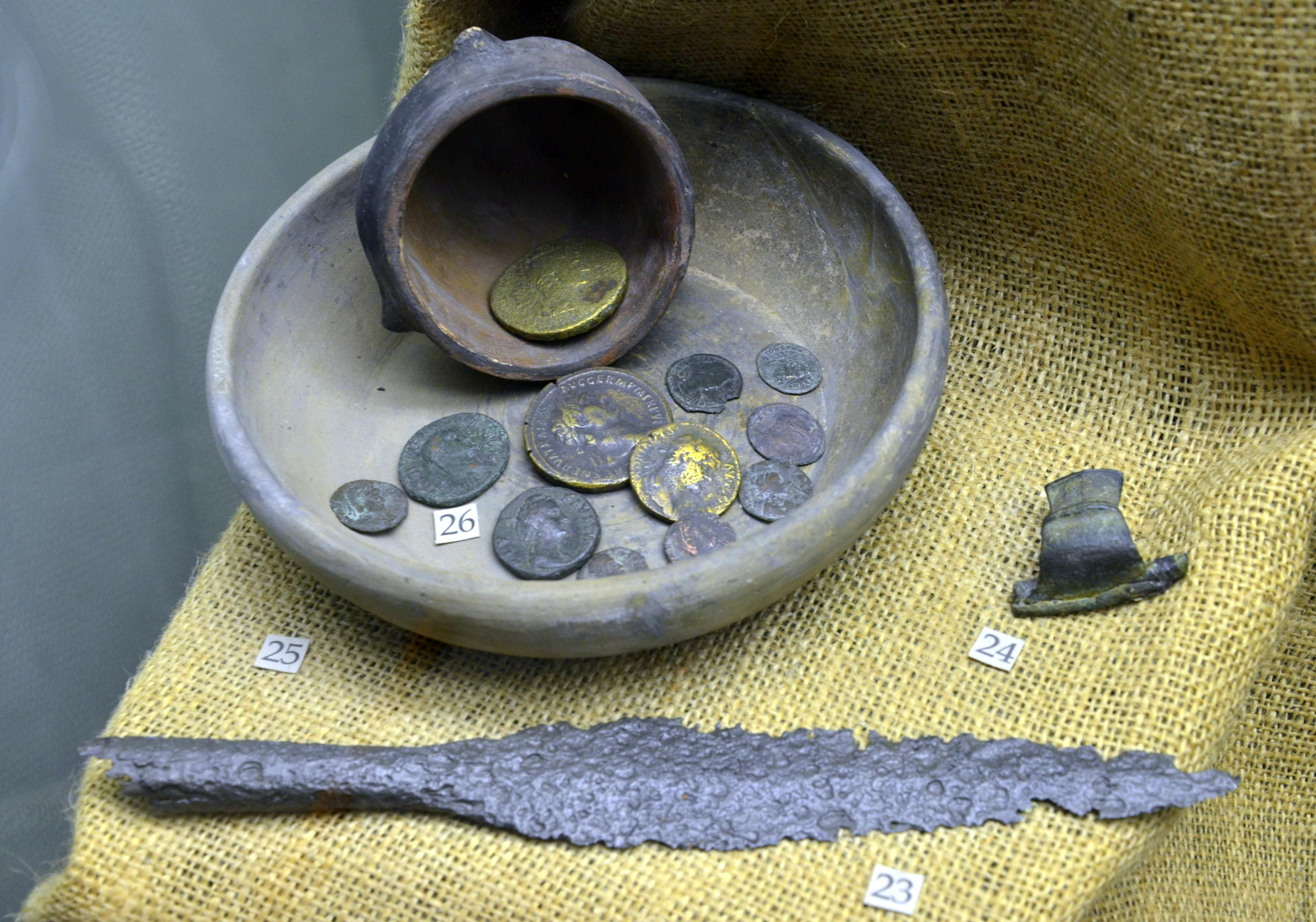
Przeworsk culture from the period of Roman influence and artifacts found near Bielsko-Biała

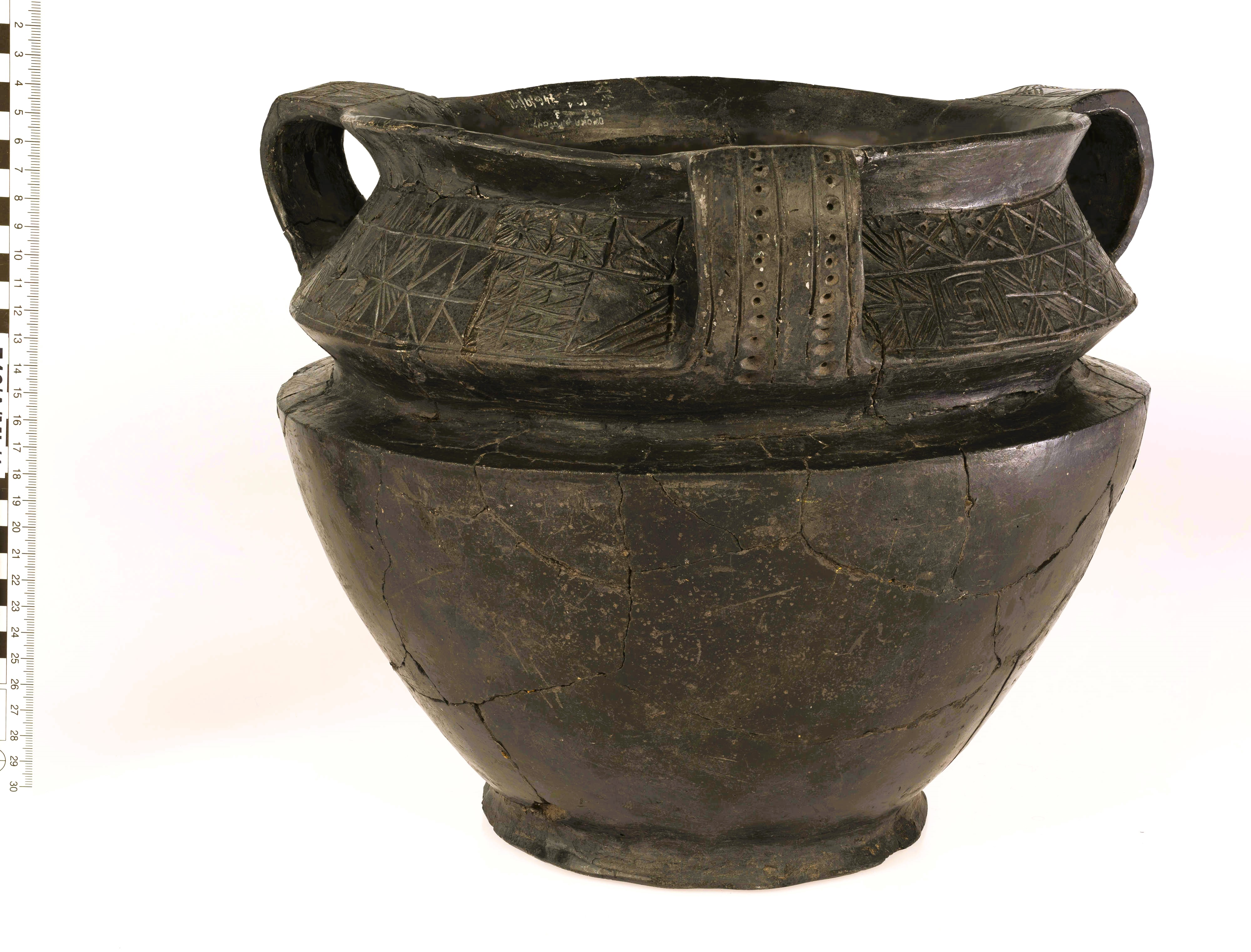
Przeworsk burials pottery

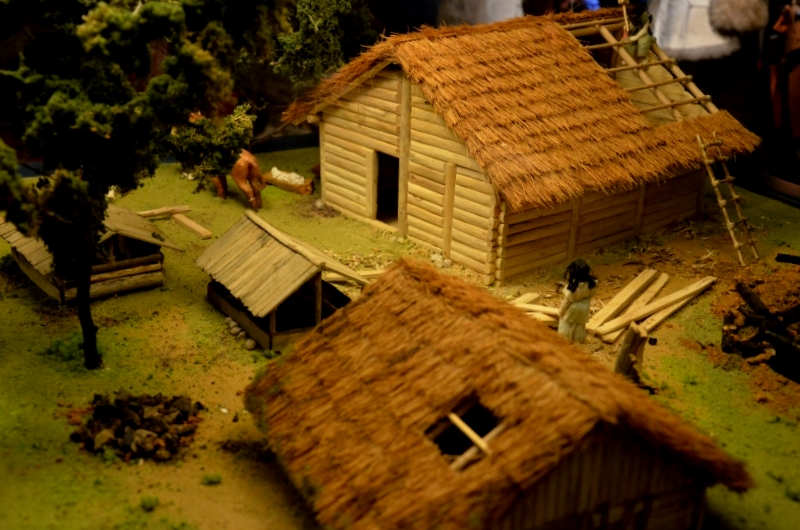
2nd-century architecture in area now Poland (timber framing)

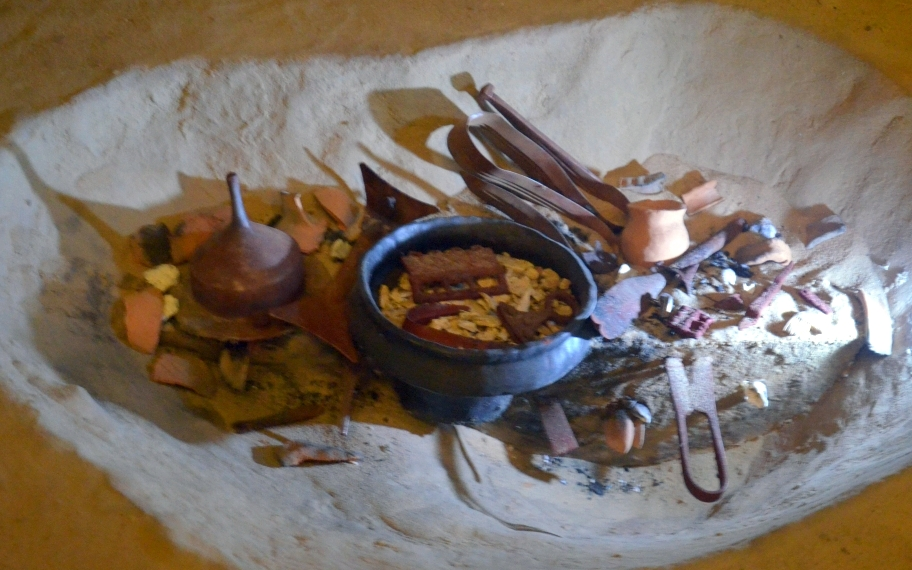
Przeworsk culture burials

The Przeworsk culture (Polish pronunciation: [ˈpʂɛvɔrsk]) was an Iron Age material culture in the region of what is now Poland, that dates from the 3rd century BC to the 5th century AD. It takes its name from the town Przeworsk, near the village where the first artifacts were identified.

In its earliest form it was located in what is now central and southern Poland, in the upper Oder and Vistula basins. It later spread southwards, beyond the Carpathians, towards the headwaters of the Tisza river, and eastwards, past the Vistula, and towards the headwaters of the Dniester.

The earliest form of the culture was a northern extension of the Celtic La Tène material culture which influenced much of continental Europe in the Iron Age, but it was also influenced by other material cultures of the region, including the Jastorf culture to its west. To the east, the Przeworsk culture is associated with the Zarubintsy culture.

== Influences ==
The Przeworsk culture appears relatively suddenly, manifested as an adaptation of the Celtic La Tène culture technology from the southwest, and was quite distinct from the preceding Pomeranian culture and Cloche culture.

To its northwest, the Przeworsk culture also shows significant contact with the Jastorf culture, associated with the spread of early Germanic peoples including the Suebi. To the east, the Przeworsk culture is associated with the Zarubintsy culture in what is now northern Ukraine and southern Belarus, and the early Slavs. Later in the 3rd and 4th centuries, much of this eastern area was subsequently absorbed by the Wielbark culture and Chernyakhov culture.

== Characteristics ==
The Przeworsk culture people lived in small, unprotected villages, populated each by a few dozen residents at most, made up of several houses, usually set partially below the ground level (semi-sunken), each covering an area of 8–22 square meters. They knew how to dig and build wells, so the settlements didn't have to be located near bodies of water. Thirteen 2nd century wells with variously constructed timber lined walls were found at a settlement in Stanisławice, Bochnia County. Fields were being used for crop cultivation for a while and then as pastures, when animal excrement helped the soil regain fertility. Once iron share plows were introduced the fields were alternated between tillage and grazing.

Several or more settlements made up a micro-region, within which the residents cooperated economically and buried their dead in a common cemetery, but which was separated from other micro-regions by undeveloped areas. A number of such micro-regions possibly made up a tribe, with these separated by empty space. The tribes in turn, especially if they were culturally closely related, would at times form larger structures, such as temporary alliances for waging wars, or even early statehood forms.

A Przeworsk culture turn of the millennium industrial complex for the extraction of salt from salt springs was discovered in Chabsk near Mogilno.

Examinations of the burial grounds, of which even the largest used continuously over periods of up to several centuries, contains no more than several hundreds graves, shows that the overall population density was low. The dead were cremated and the ashes sometimes placed in urns, which had the mid-part in the form of an engraved bulge. In the 1st century AD this was replaced with a sharp-profiled (with a horizontal ridge around the circumference) shape.

In Siemiechów a grave of a warrior who may have taken part in the Ariovistus expedition during the 70–50 BC period was found; it contains Celtic weapons and an Alpine region manufactured helmet used as an urn, together with local ceramics. The burial gifts were often, for unknown reasons, bent or broken, and then burned with the body. The burials range from "poor" to "rich", the latter ones supplied with fancy Celtic and then Roman imports, reflecting a considerably by this time developed social stratification.

The main feature of the Przeworsk culture are burials. These were mostly cremations, with occasional inhumation. Warrior burials are notable, which often include horse-gear and spurs. Some burials are exceptionally rich, overshadowing the graves of Germanic groups further west, especially after 400 AD. Pottery and metalwork are often rich and show a great variety

== Peoples ==
The Przeworsk culture was probably not exclusively connected with a single ancient ethnic or linguistic group. In classical ethnography, the culture was linked to a group of peoples known as the Lugii. Among specific Germanic peoples, the Przeworsk culture is often associated with the Vandals, although they were probably only one ethnic element within the culture. Also, the Przeworsk culture has been linked to the early Slavs, with recent studies, which looked at the morphological features of skeletal remains, suggesting that populations of the Przeworsk, Wielbark, and Cherniakhovo cultures from the Roman period bore closer similarities to the early medieval West Slavs than to the medieval Germanic-speaking populations. Another archaeological study rejected a connection with and continuity of the early Slavs.

== Decline ==
The culture's decline in the late 5th century coincides with the invasion of the Huns. Other factors may have included the social crisis that occurred as a result of the collapse of the Roman world and the trade contacts it maintained with peoples beyond its borders. In the late 5/6th century, the early Slavic Prague-Korchak culture appears in the Vistula basin.

== Gallery ==
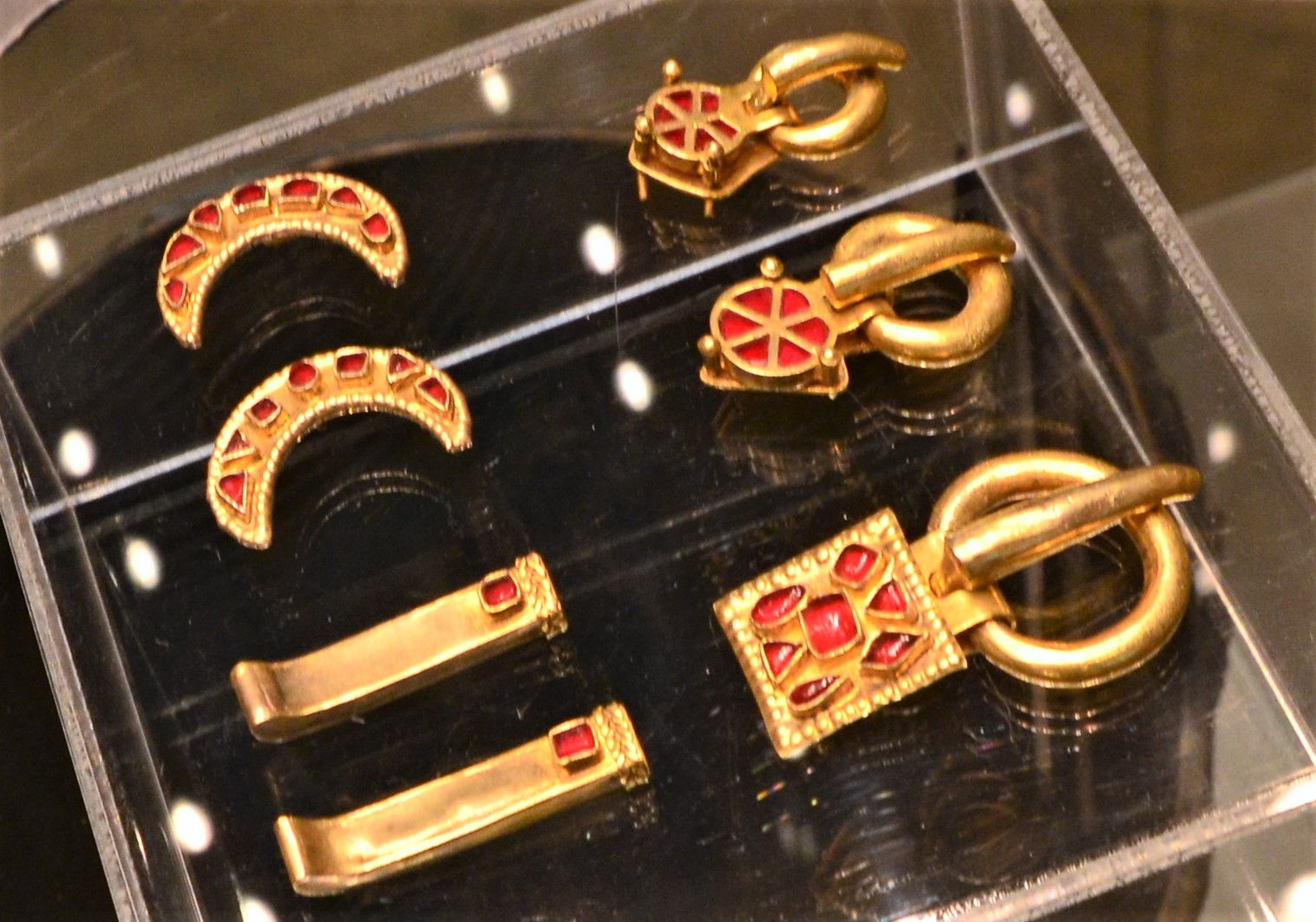
Gold belt buckles, c. 400 AD

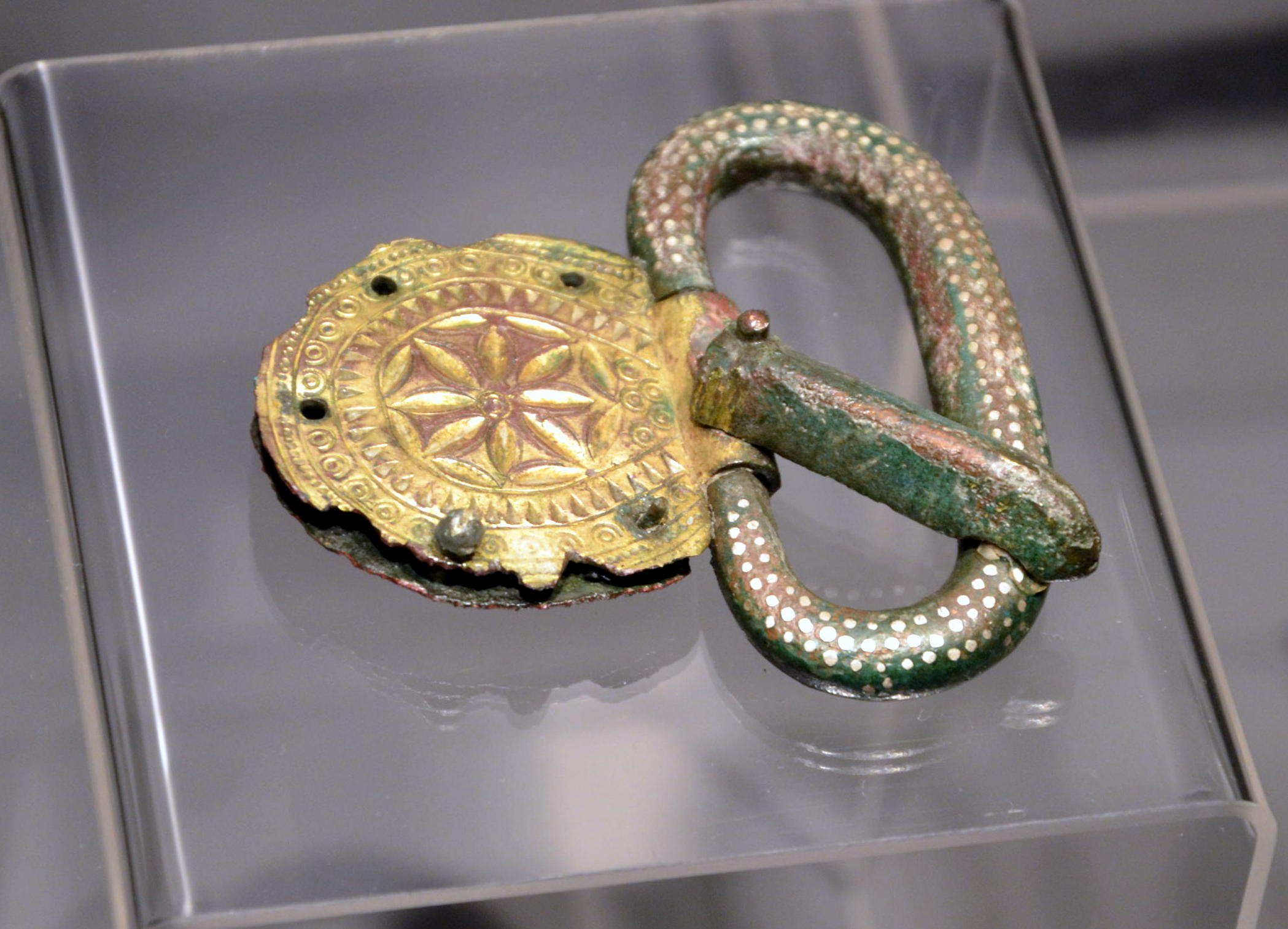
Belt buckle, c. 450 AD

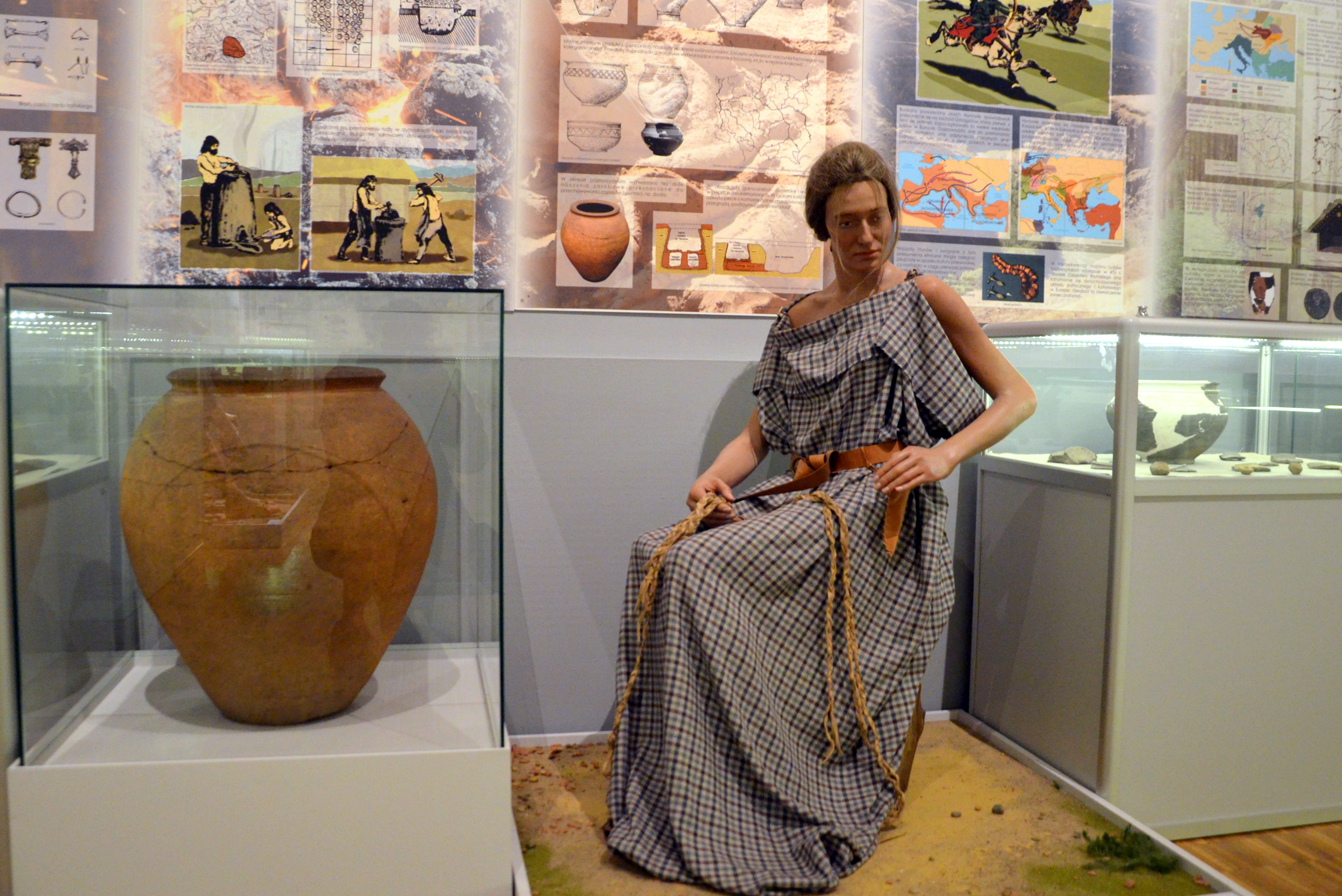
Museum display and reconstruction

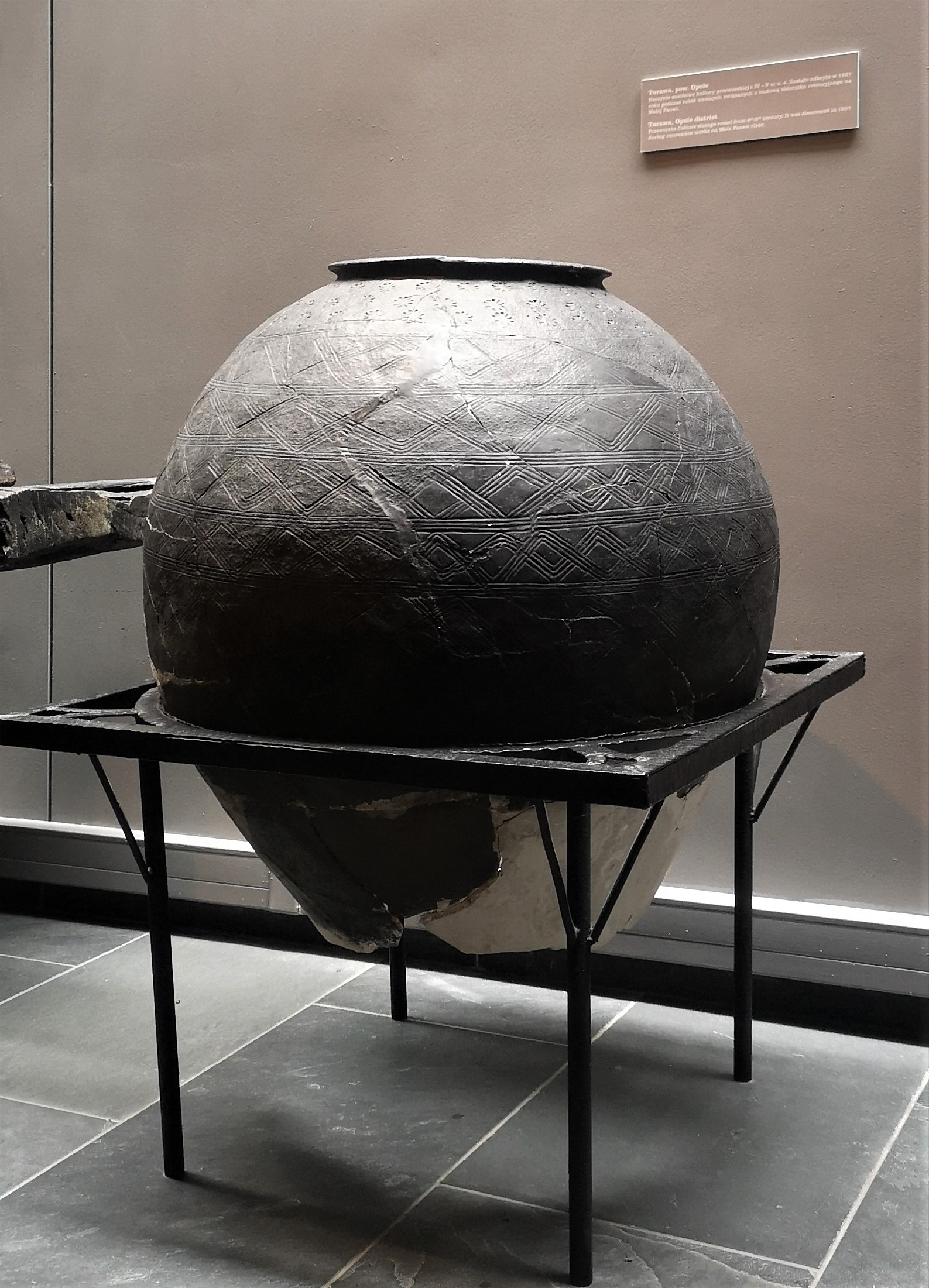
Ceramic storage vessel

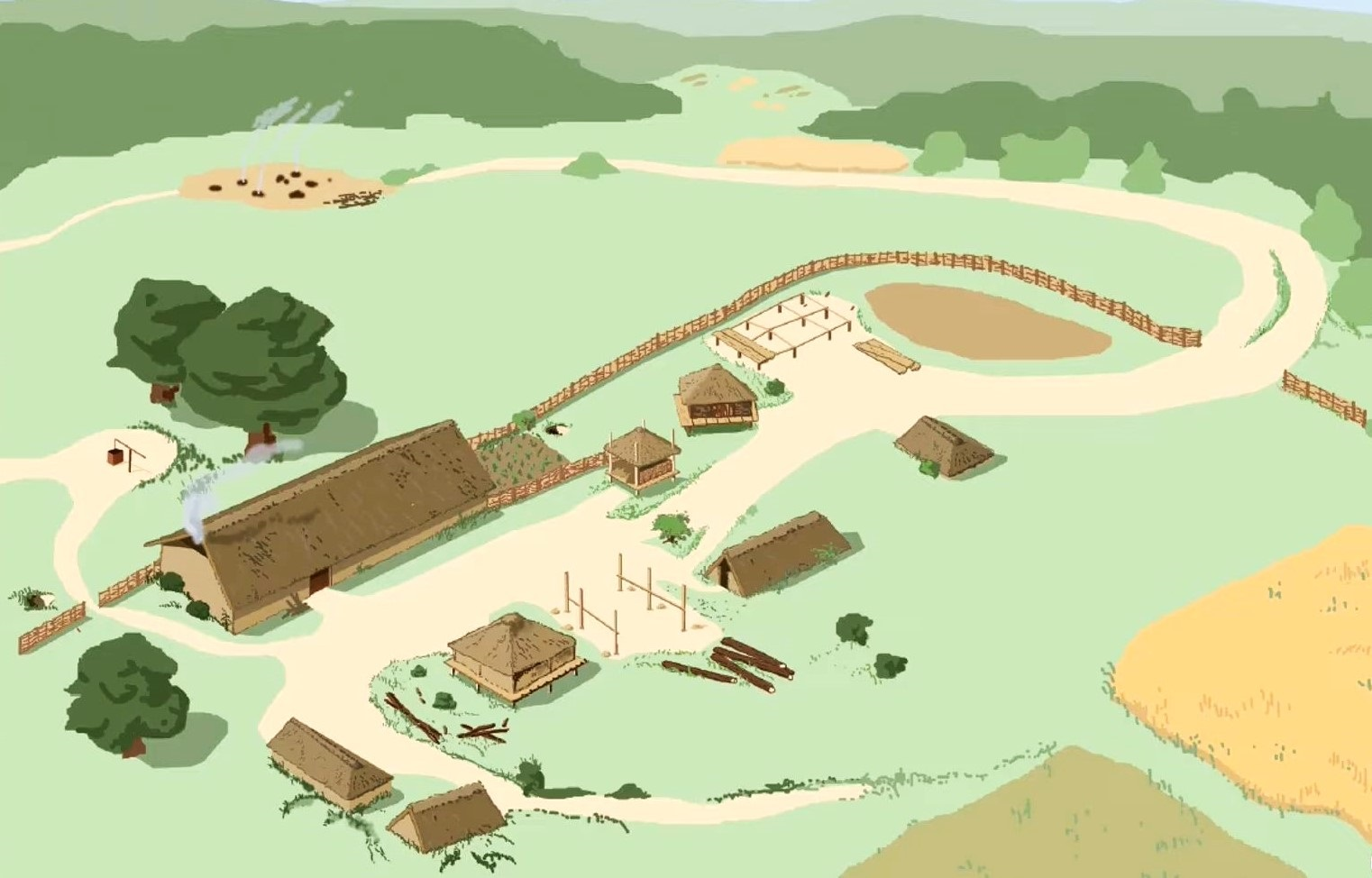
Germanic homestead, Przeworsk culture, 3rd-4th century

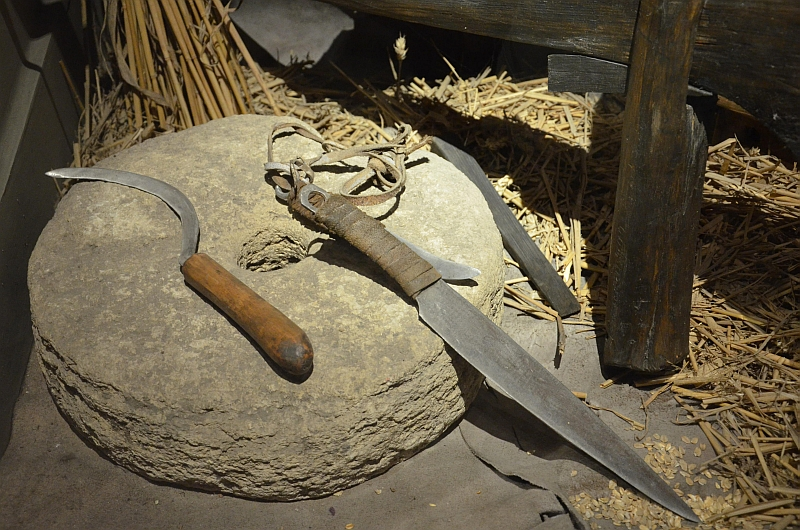
Recreations of various bladed iron tools from c. 250 BC, including a sickle

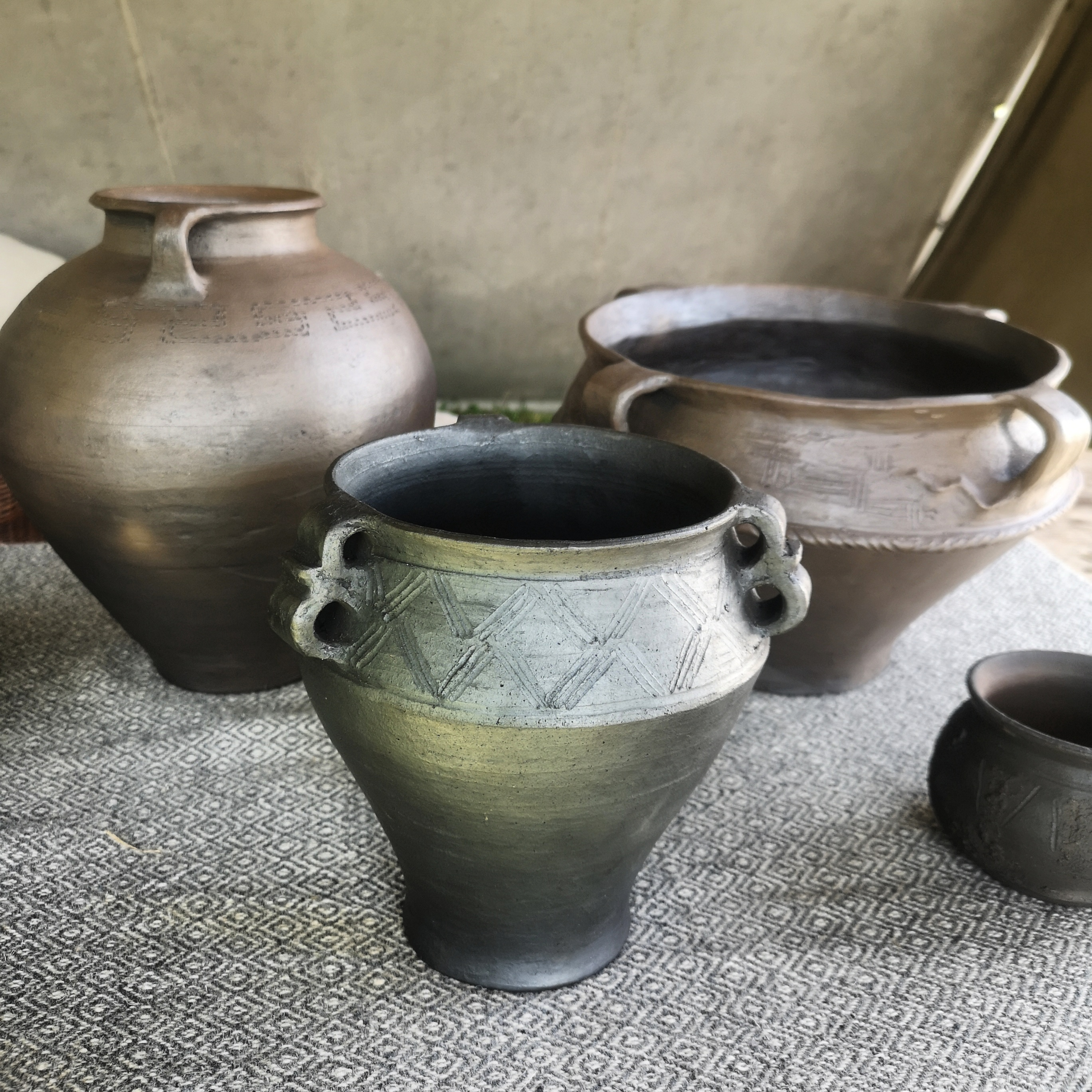
Reconstructed Przeworsk culture pottery

== See also ==
- Przeworsk culture settlements and burial sites
- Amber Road
