= Luboszyce culture =

Archaeological culture in Germany

Liebesitz culture – a culture of East-Germanic tribes developed in the areas between Oder and Elbe in Northeastern Germania, in the late period of Roman influence (2nd-4th century). The name derives after an important archaeological site in Liebesitz near Guben. The people of the culture originally settled in the area of Lausitz, gradually expanding its range to the North-West part of Lower Silesia (Niederschlesien), south Brandenburg, and the state of Saxony (Sachsen).
