= Luboszyce, Lubusz Voivodeship =

Luboszyce
- Village
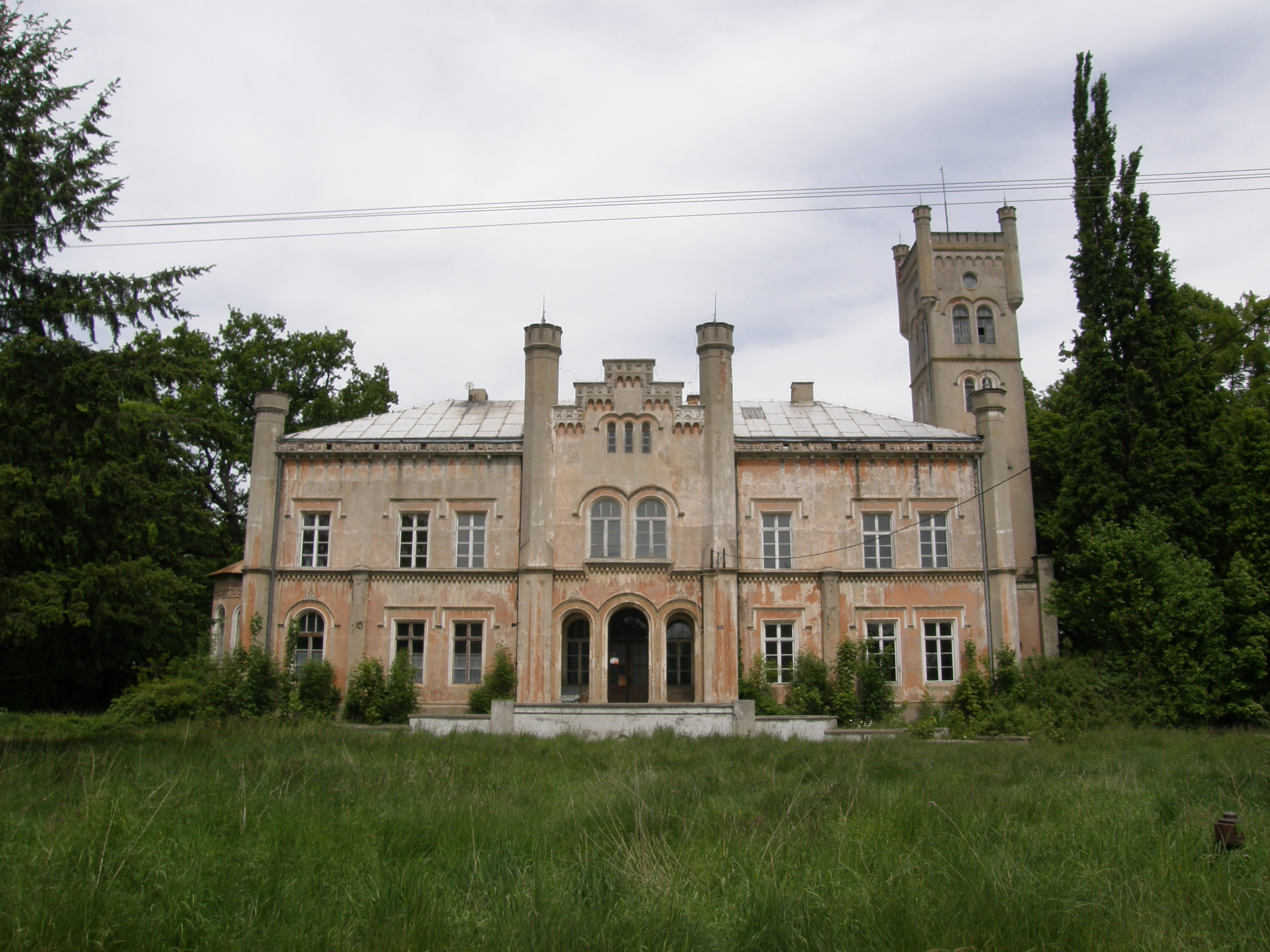
- Palace

- Location within Poland
- Coordinates: 51°51′N 14°43′E
- Country: Poland
- Voivodeship: Lubusz
- County: Krosno
- Gmina: Gubin

Luboszyce ([lubɔˈʂɨt͡sɛ]; German: Liebesitz; Lower Sorbian: Lubošojce) is a village in the administrative district of Gmina Gubin, within Krosno County, Lubusz Voivodeship, in western Poland, close to the German border.

In the village there is a neo-gothic castle from 1846–1850 with an interesting landscape park, while in adjacency – an important archaeological site of Liebesitz culture from 2nd-4th centuries (remains of a village and a cemetery).
