= Nordic Stone Age =

Time period in Scandinavia

The Nordic Stone Age was the Stone Age of Scandinavia. During the Weichselian glaciation (115,000–11,700 years ago), almost all of Scandinavia was buried beneath a thick permanent ice cover, thus, the Stone Age came rather late to this region. As the climate slowly warmed up by the end of the ice age, nomadic hunters from central Europe sporadically visited the region. However, it was not until around 12,000 BCE that permanent, but nomadic, habitation in the region took root.

== Late Upper Paleolithic ==
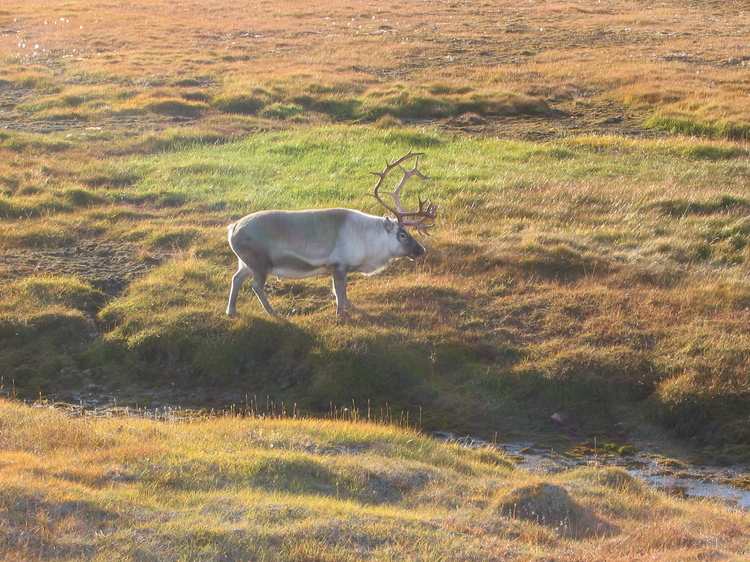
Reindeer in tundra landscape

As the ice receded, reindeer grazed the emerging tundra plains of Denmark and southernmost Sweden. This was the era of the Hamburg culture, tribes who hunted in vast territories that spanned over 100,000 km^{2}, and lived as nomads in teepees, following the reindeer seasonal migrations across the barren tundra. On this land, there was little plant cover, except for occasional arctic white birch and rowan. Slowly a taiga forest appeared.

Around 11,400 BCE, the Bromme culture emerged in Southern Scandinavia. This was a more rapidly warming era providing opportunity for other substantial hunting game animals than the ubiquitous reindeer. As former hunter-gather cultures, the Bromme culture was still largely dependent on reindeer and lived a nomadic life, but their camps diversified significantly and they were the first people to settle Southern Scandinavia (and the Southern Baltic area) on a permanent, yet still nomadic, basis.

Local climate changes around 10,500 BCE initiated both cultural changes and the first settling of the northern parts of Scandinavia. Initially, a thousand-year-long climate cool-down replaced the taiga with tundra and the local culture reverted to former traditions, focusing on reindeer hunting. This culture is now referred to as the Ahrensburg culture. Around 9,500 BCE, the local climate warmed yet again, as the pre-Boreal era emerged, which triggered the Ahrensburg to settle the emerging tundra of northern Scandinavia. For the next two thousand years, the climatic phase known as the Boreal reigned in the Scandinavian region.

== Mesolithic ==
In the 7th millennium BCE, the climate in Scandinavia was warming as it transitioned from the former Boreal age to the Atlantic period. Reindeer and their hunters had already migrated and inhabited the lands of northern Scandinavia, and forests had established. A culture called the Maglemosian culture lived in the areas of Denmark and southern Sweden. To the north, in Norway and along the coast of western Sweden, the Fosna-Hensbacka culture was living mostly in changing seasonal camps along the shores and close to the now thriving forests. Utilizing fire, boats and stone tools, these Stone Age tribal cultures managed to survive in northern Europe. The northern hunter-gatherers followed the herds and the salmon runs, moving south during the winters, moving north again during the summers. These early peoples followed cultural traditions similar to those practiced throughout other regions in the far north – areas including modern Finland, Russia, and across the Bering Strait into the northernmost strip of North America (comprising portions of today's Alaska and Canada).

During the 6th millennium BCE, the climate of Scandinavia was generally warmer and more humid than today and the southern regions were clad in lush temperate broadleaf and mixed forests. Large animals like aurochs, wisent, moose and red deer roamed freely in the forests and were game for tribes of what is now called the Kongemose culture. Like their predecessors, the Kongemose tribes also hunted marine animals such as seals and fished in the rich shallow waters. North of the Kongemose people, lived other hunter-gatherers in most of southern Norway and Sweden, now dubbed the Nøstvet and Lihult cultures, descendants of the Fosna and Hensbacka cultures. By the end of the 6th millennium BCE, as the sea levels rose gradually, these northerly tribal cultures continued their way of life, while the Kongemose culture was replaced by the Ertebølle culture, adapting to the climatic changes affecting their low lying southern regions more severely.

Genetic analysis of human remains has shown that the hunter-gatherers living in the south and north of Scandinavia formed two genetically distinct groups who arrived into Scandinavia in at least two separate waves of migration. In the south and south-east, Western Hunter-Gatherers arrived from modern-day Germany and moved northwards. In the north and west, Eastern Hunter-Gatherers, related to people from the Upper Volga region in modern-day Russia, settled and moved southwards. These people intermixed in Scandinavia and formed a unique group of Scandinavian Hunter-Gatherers.

From as early as c. 4400 BC there are rare imports of copper axes into Scandinavian Late Mesolithic communities.

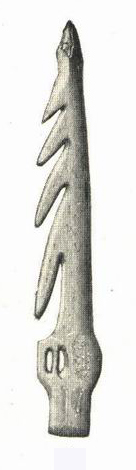
Harpoon head of bone

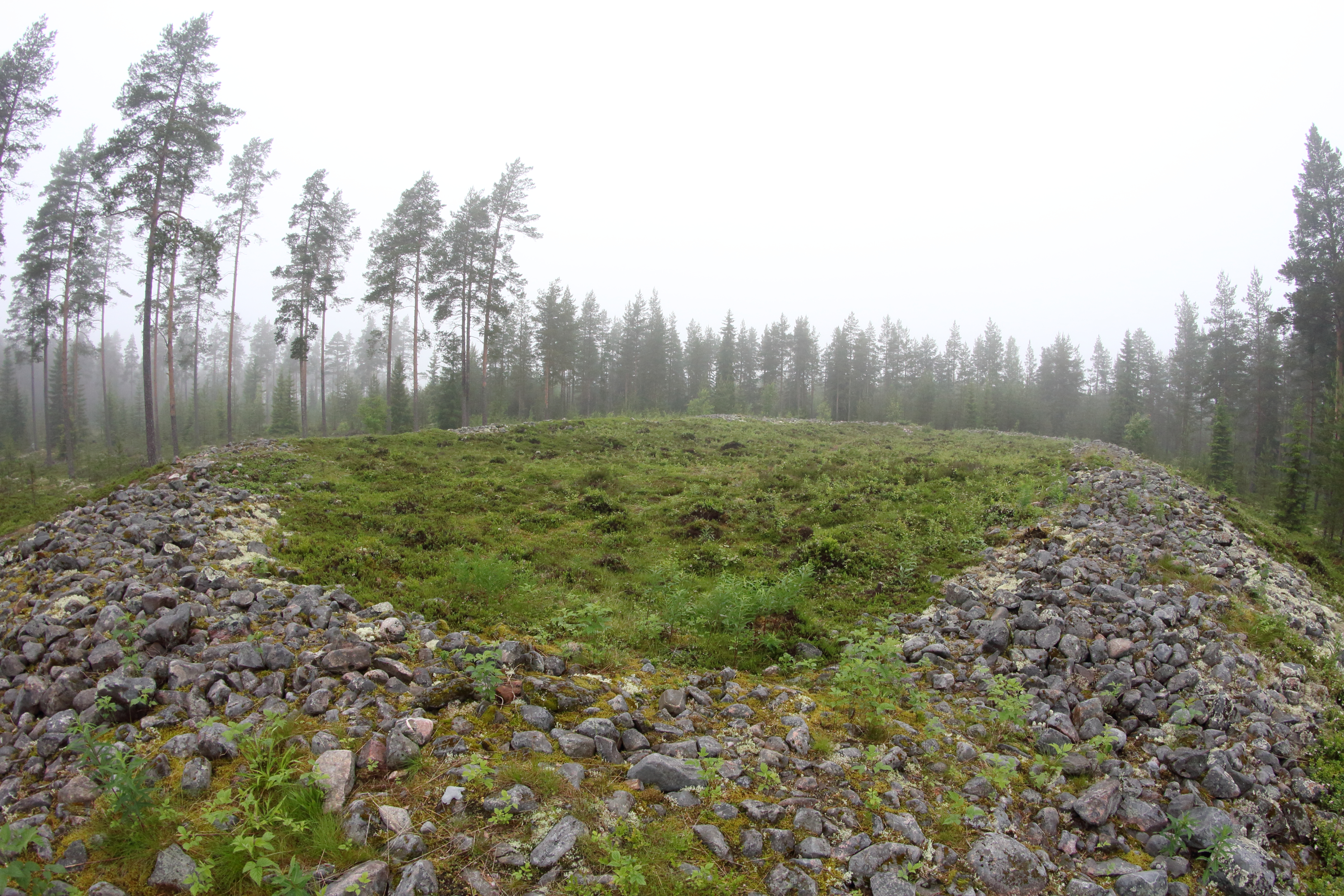
Giant's Church, Finland

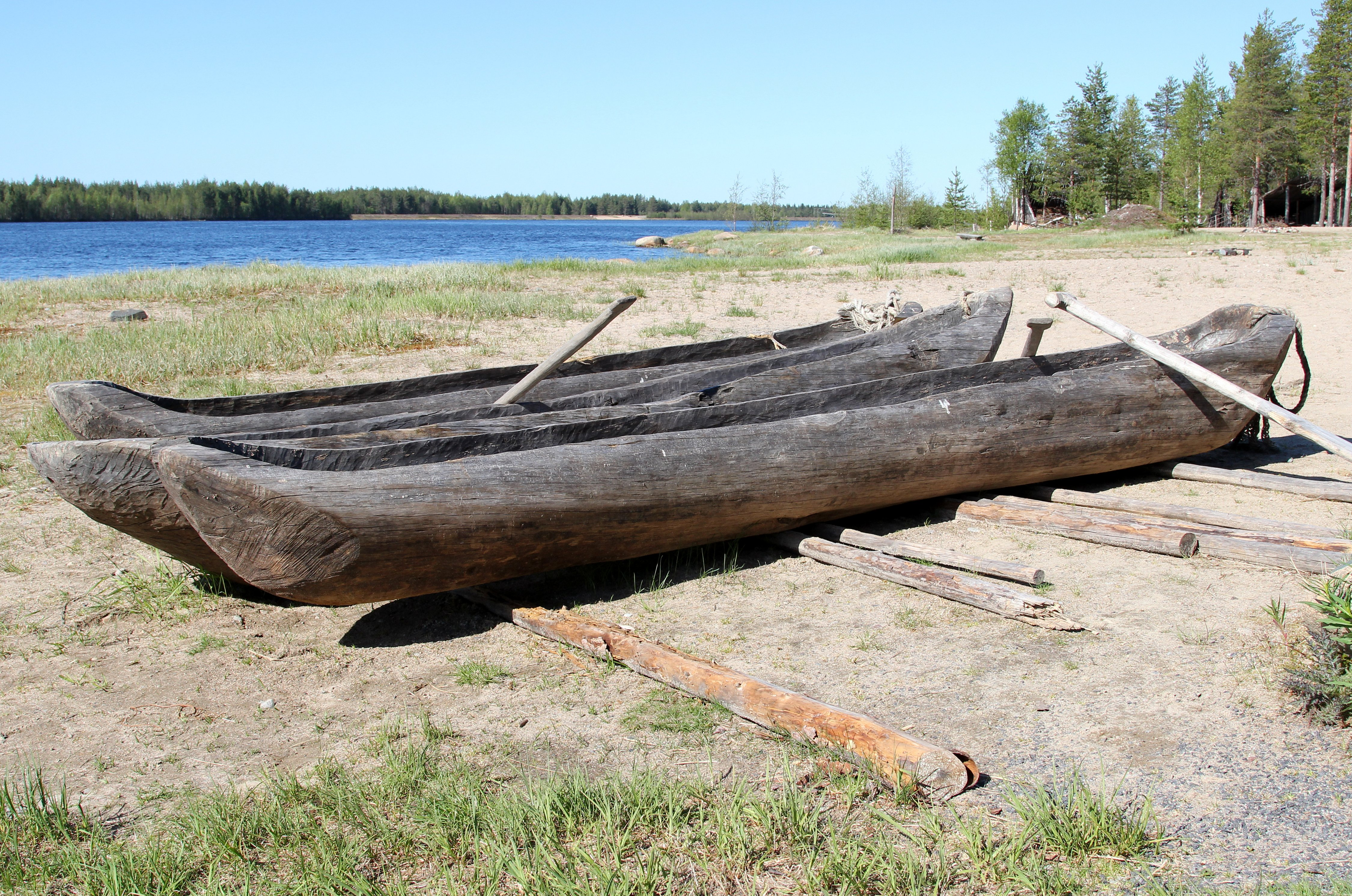
Dugout canoes, reconstruction

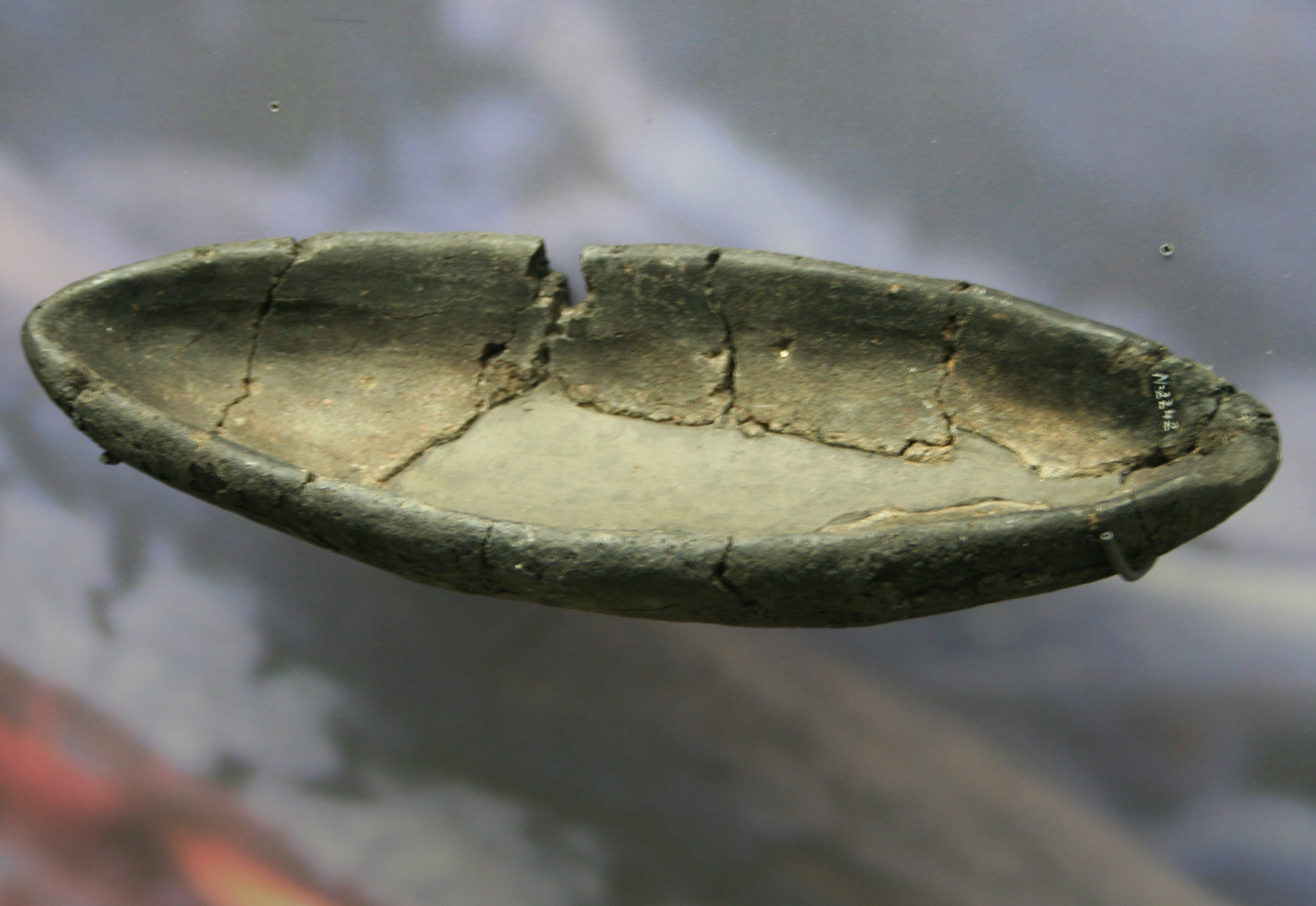
Ertebolle culture ceramic boat model

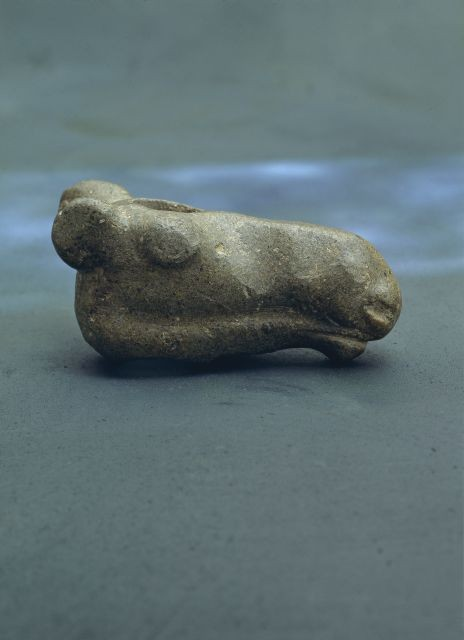
The Elk's Head of Huittinen, Finland, c. 6500 BC

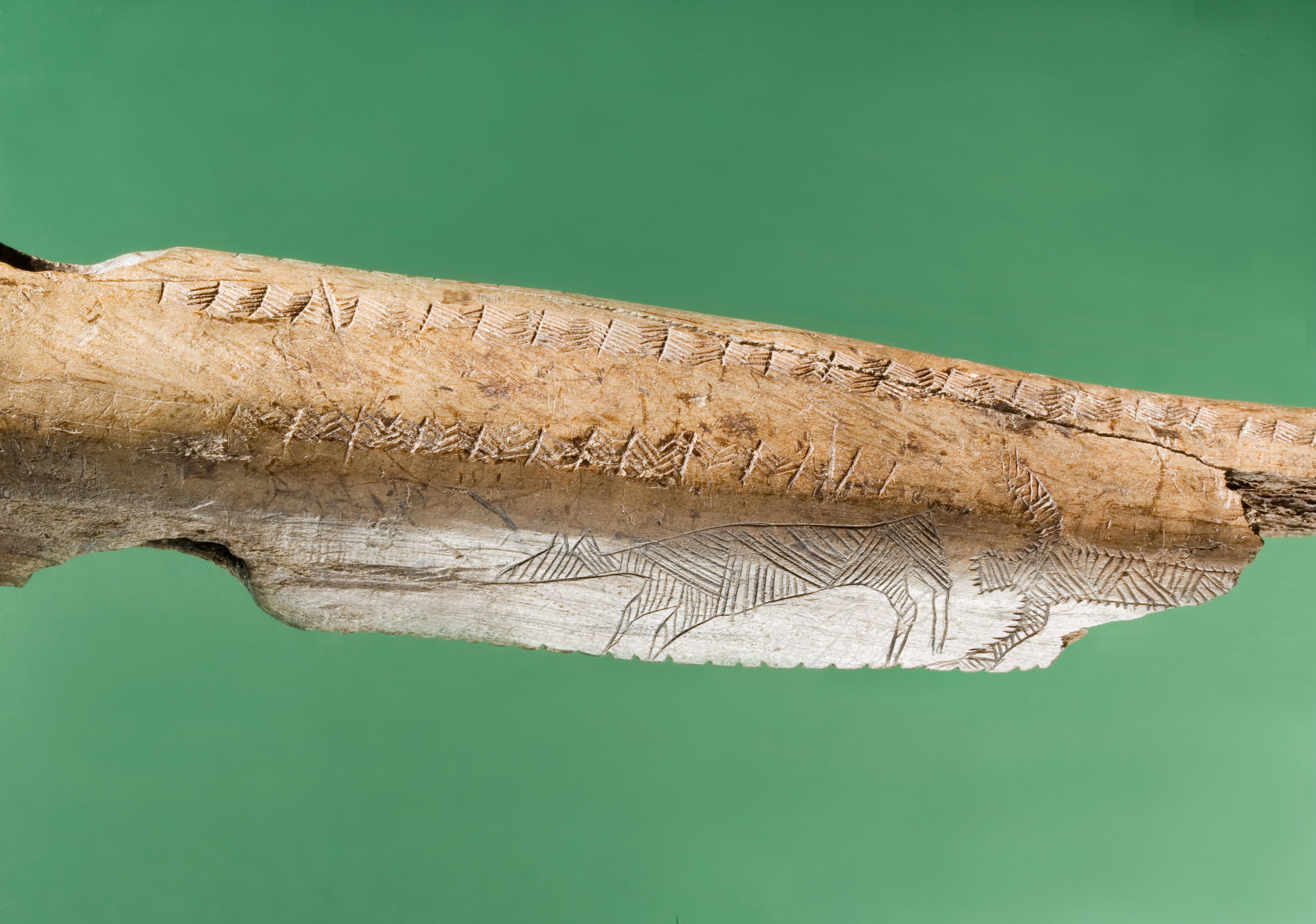
Engraved antler from Bodal Mose, Denmark

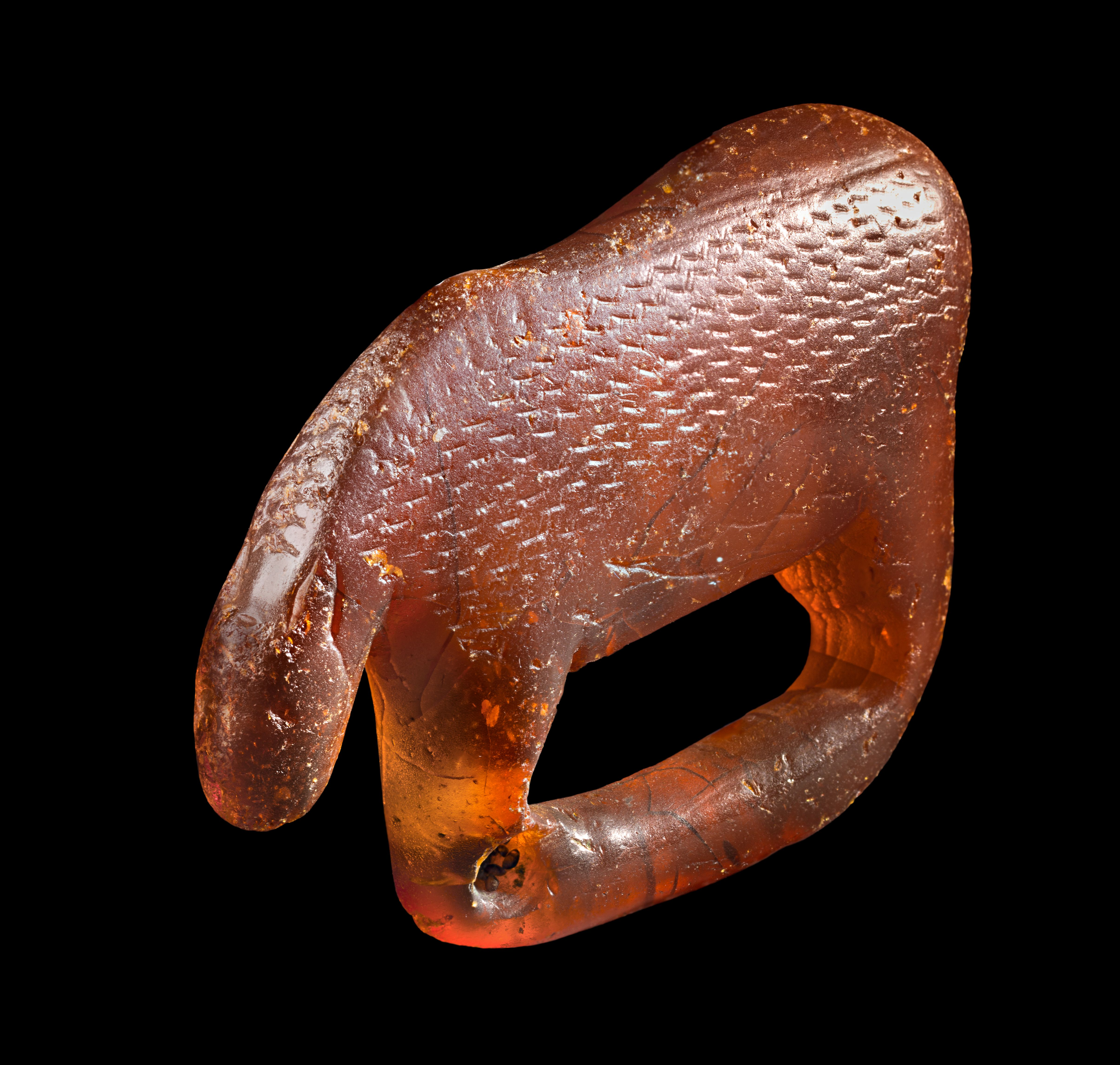
Animal figurine carved from amber, from Næsby Strand, Denmark

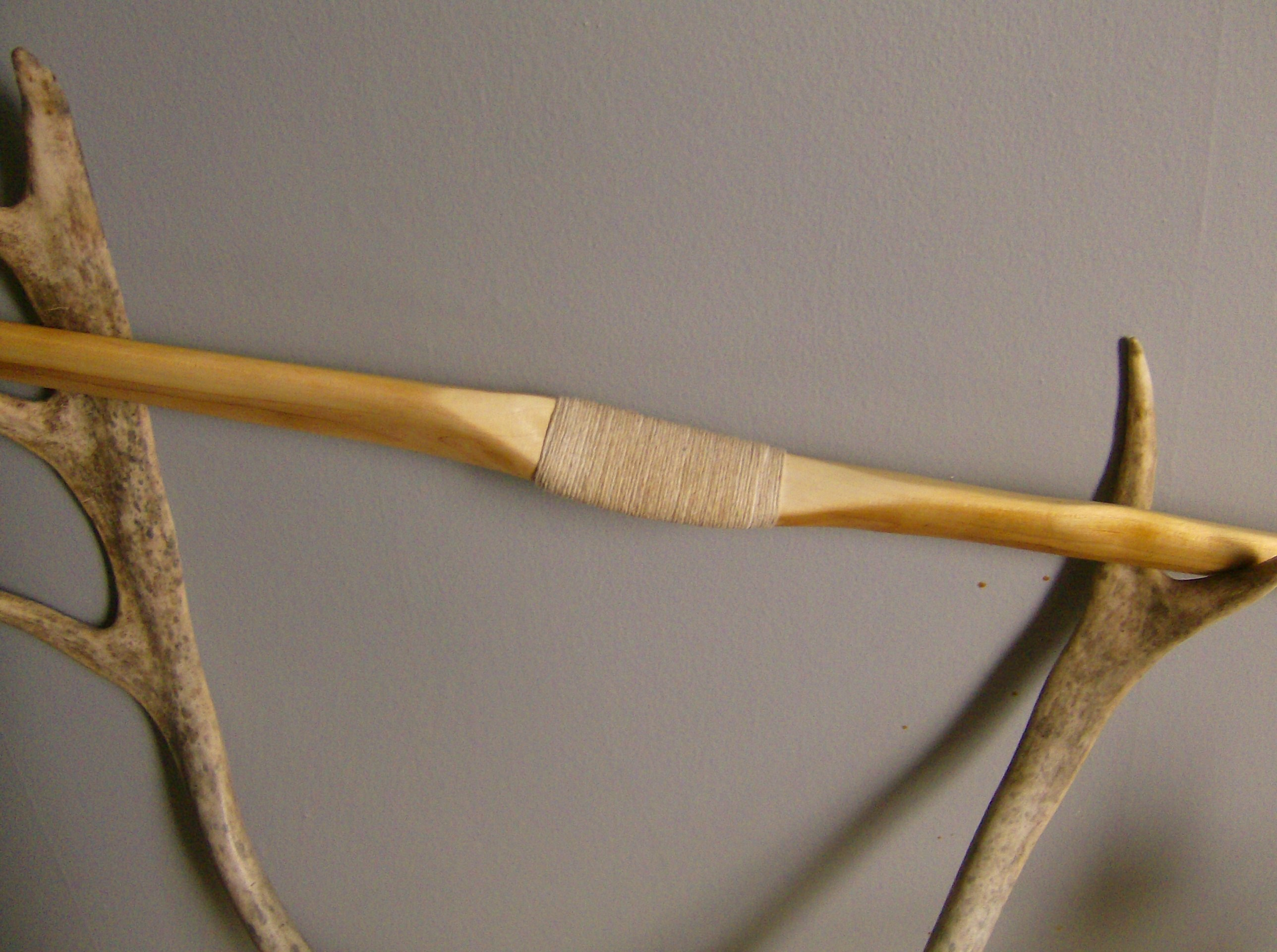
Holmegaard bow (reconstruction), Denmark, 7000 BC

== Neolithic ==
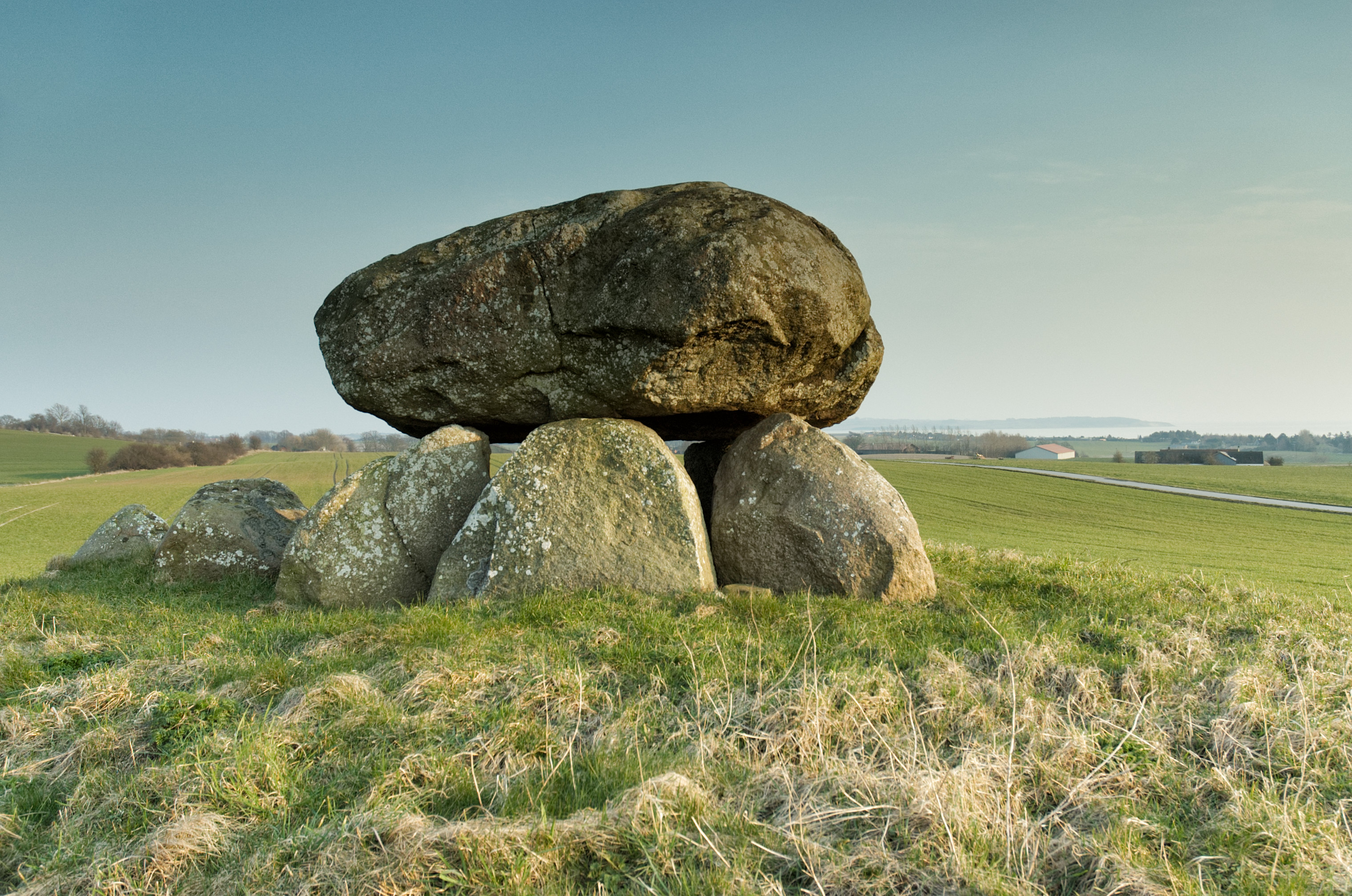
Dolmens, Funnelbeaker culture

During the 5th millennium BCE, the Ertebølle people learned pottery from neighbouring tribes in the south, who had begun to cultivate the land and keep animals. Soon, they too started to cultivate the land and, c. 4000 BCE, they became part of the megalithic Funnelbeaker culture. During the 4th millennium BCE, these Funnelbeaker tribes expanded into Sweden up to Uppland. The Nøstvet and Lihult tribes learned new technology from the advancing farmers, but not agriculture, and became the Pitted Ware cultures, towards the end of the 4th millennium BCE. These Pitted Ware tribes halted the advance of the farmers and pushed them south into south-western Sweden, but some say that the farmers were not killed or chased away, but that they voluntarily joined the Pitted Ware culture and became part of them. At least one settlement appears to be mixed, the Alvastra pile-dwelling. Copper metallurgy was practiced by the Funnelbeaker culture from c. 3500 BC.

The language these early Scandinavians spoke is unknown, but towards the end of the 3rd millennium BCE, they were overrun by new tribes who many scholars believe spoke Proto-Indo-European (or more exactly, the "Pre-Germanic Indo-European" dialect), the Corded Ware culture (known as the Battle-Axe culture in Scandinavia). The genetic history of Europe connects the people carrying the language with the Yamnaya culture emanating from present-day Ukraine, using the Y-chromosome haplogroup R1a as an important genetic marker. This new people advanced up to Uppland and the Oslofjord, and they probably provided the Proto-Germanic language that was the ancestor of the modern Scandinavian languages. These new tribes used the battle axe as a status symbol and were cattle herders, and with them most of southern Scandinavia entered the Neolithic period. The Single Grave culture was another variant of the Corded Ware culture which spread across southern Scandinavia and the North European Plain between 2,800–2,200 BC.

After c. 2400 groups associated with the Bell Beaker culture migrated into Jutland, bringing with them new skills in mining and sailing. They mined flint in northern Jutland for the mass production of flint daggers that were subsequently distributed to most of Scandinavia. As such the period from c. 2400 – c. 1800 BC is also known as the Dagger Period. Copper metallurgy was practised on a small scale from c. 2400 BC, and the shape of flint daggers imitated copper and bronze prototypes. After c. 2000 BC large 'chiefly' houses similar to those found in the Unetice culture appear in south Scandinavia, indicating the development of a more ranked social organization. 2000 BC also marks the introduction and use of bronze tools, followed by a more systematic adoption of bronze metalworking technology from 1750 BC. The Neolithic period was followed by the Nordic Bronze Age.

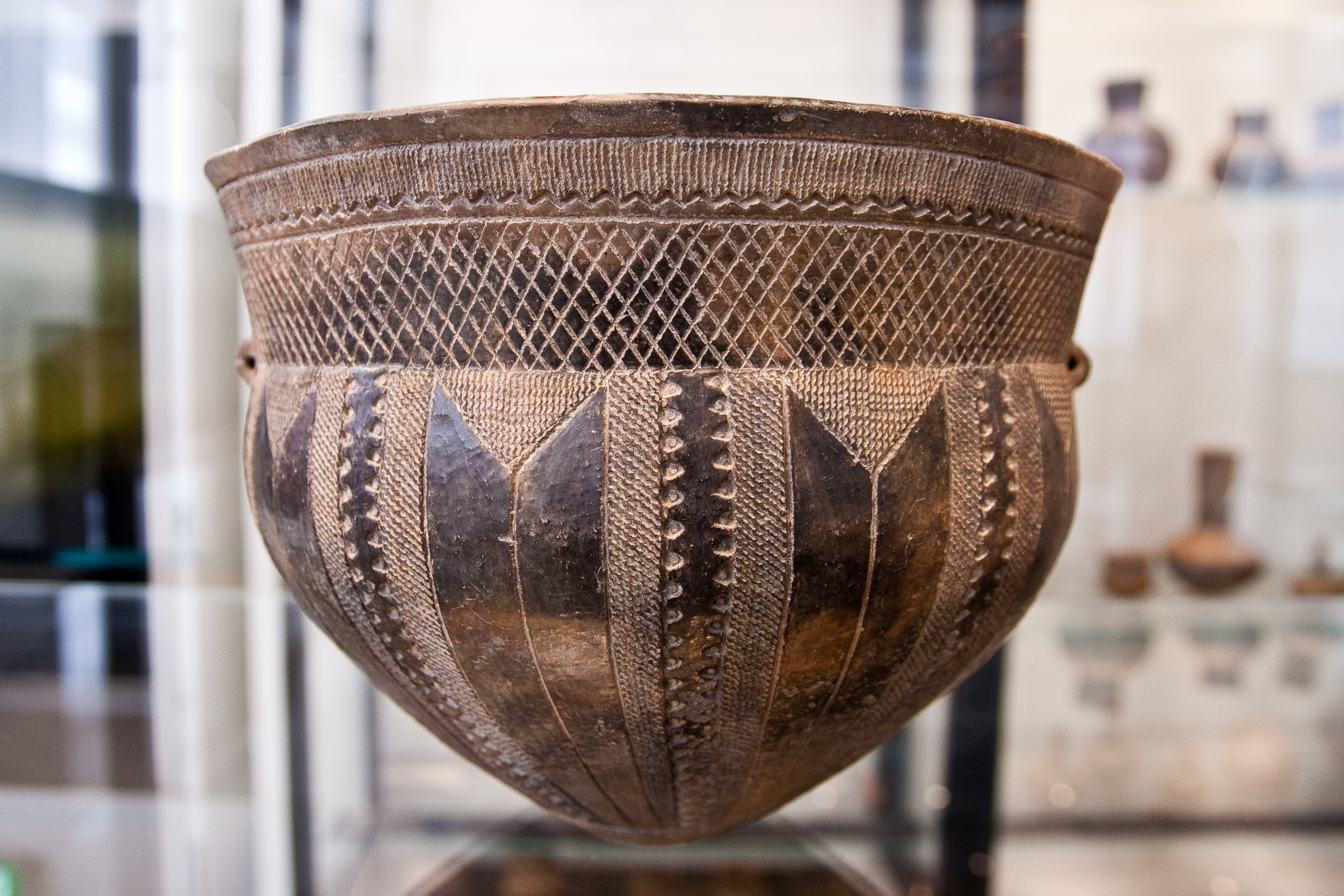
Skarpsalling vessel, Funnelbeaker culture, Denmark, c. 3200 BCE

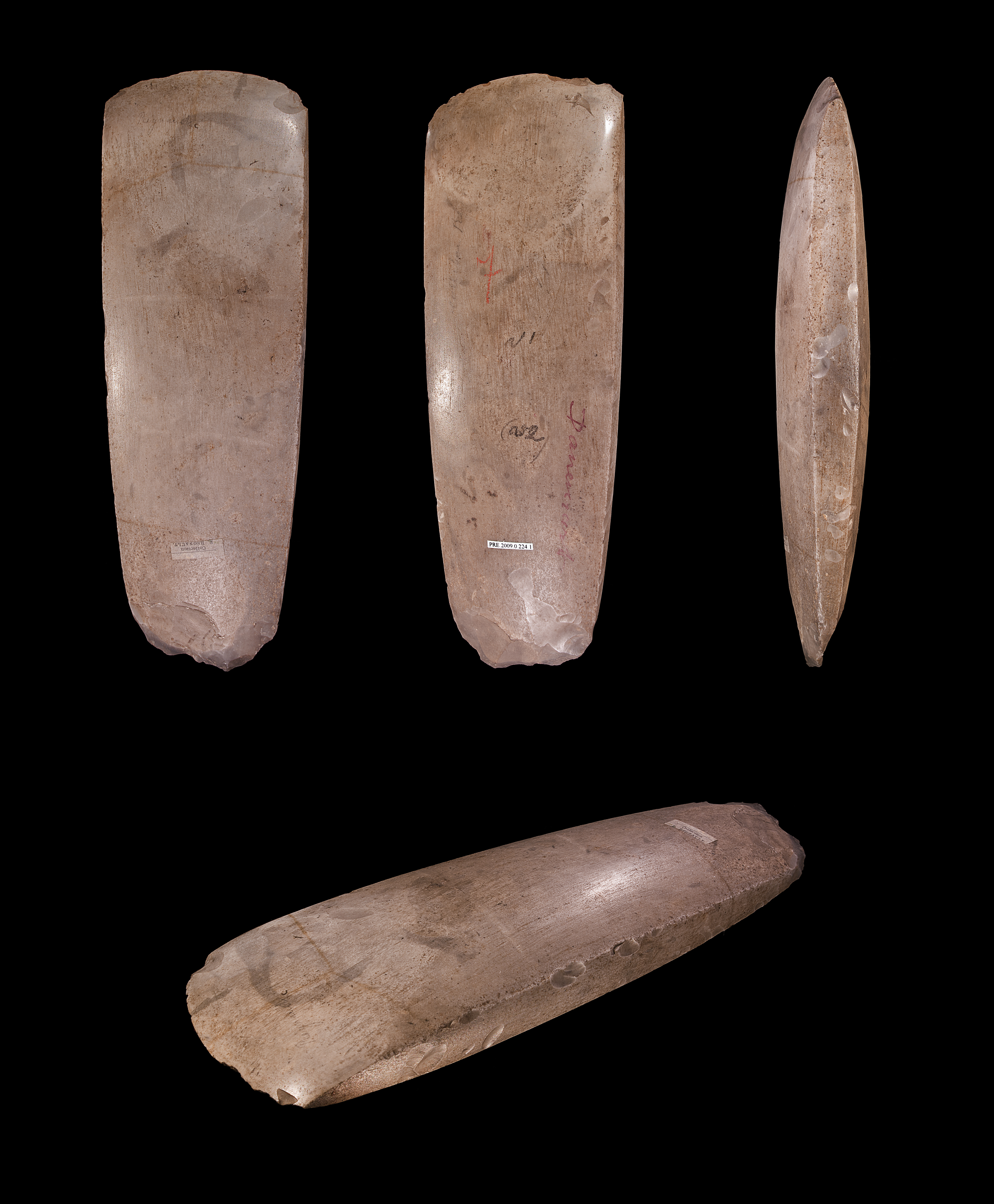
Axe head, polished stone, Funnelbeaker culture

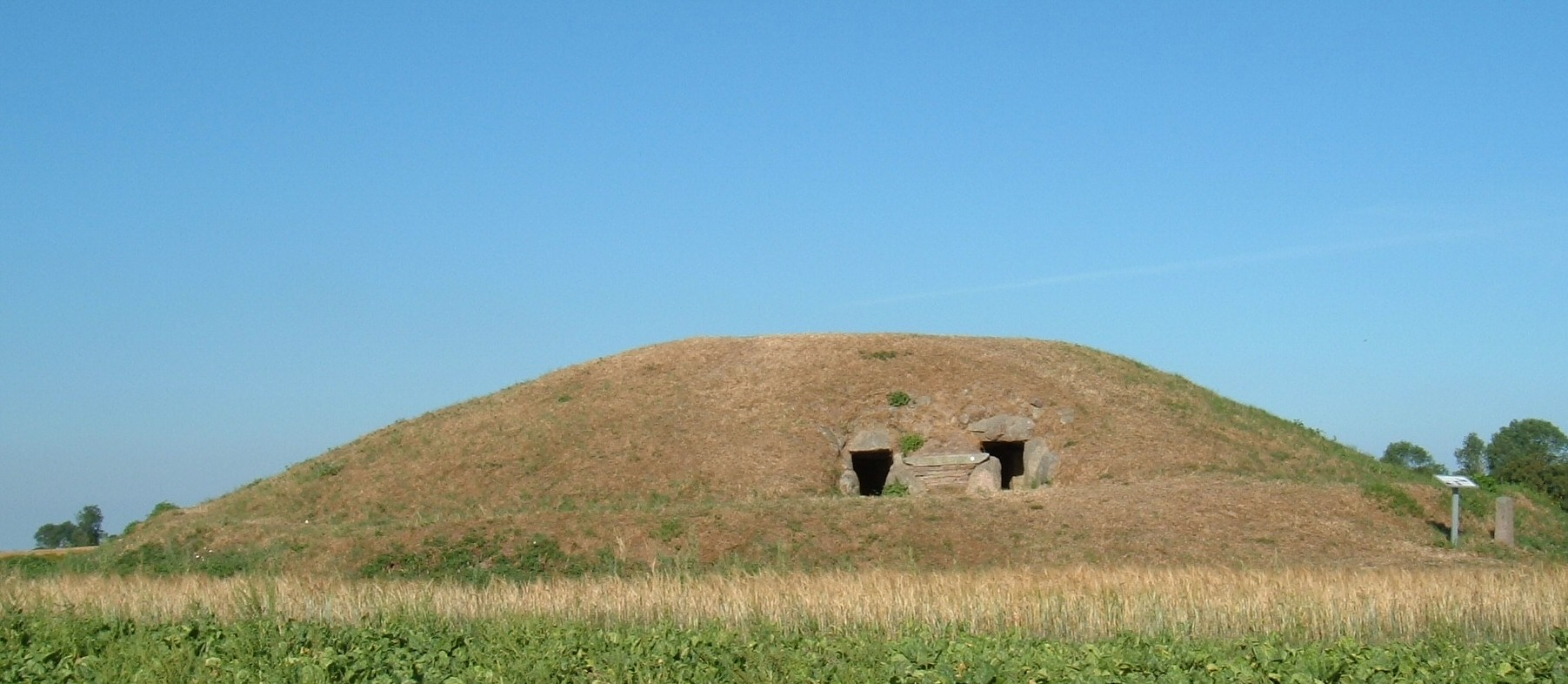
Passage graves (Klekkende Høj, Denmark)

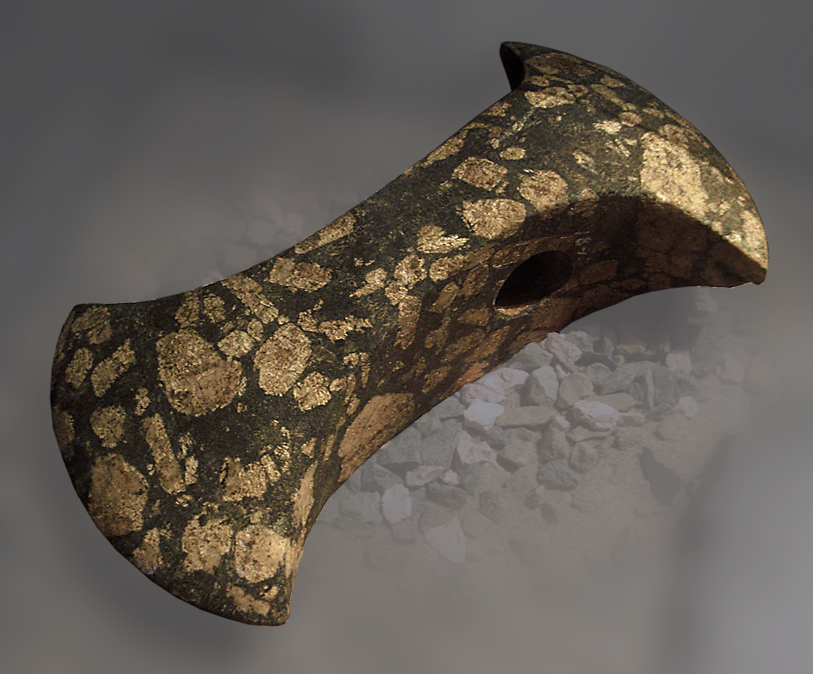
Double-edged battle axe head in porphyry, Funnelbeaker culture, Sweden

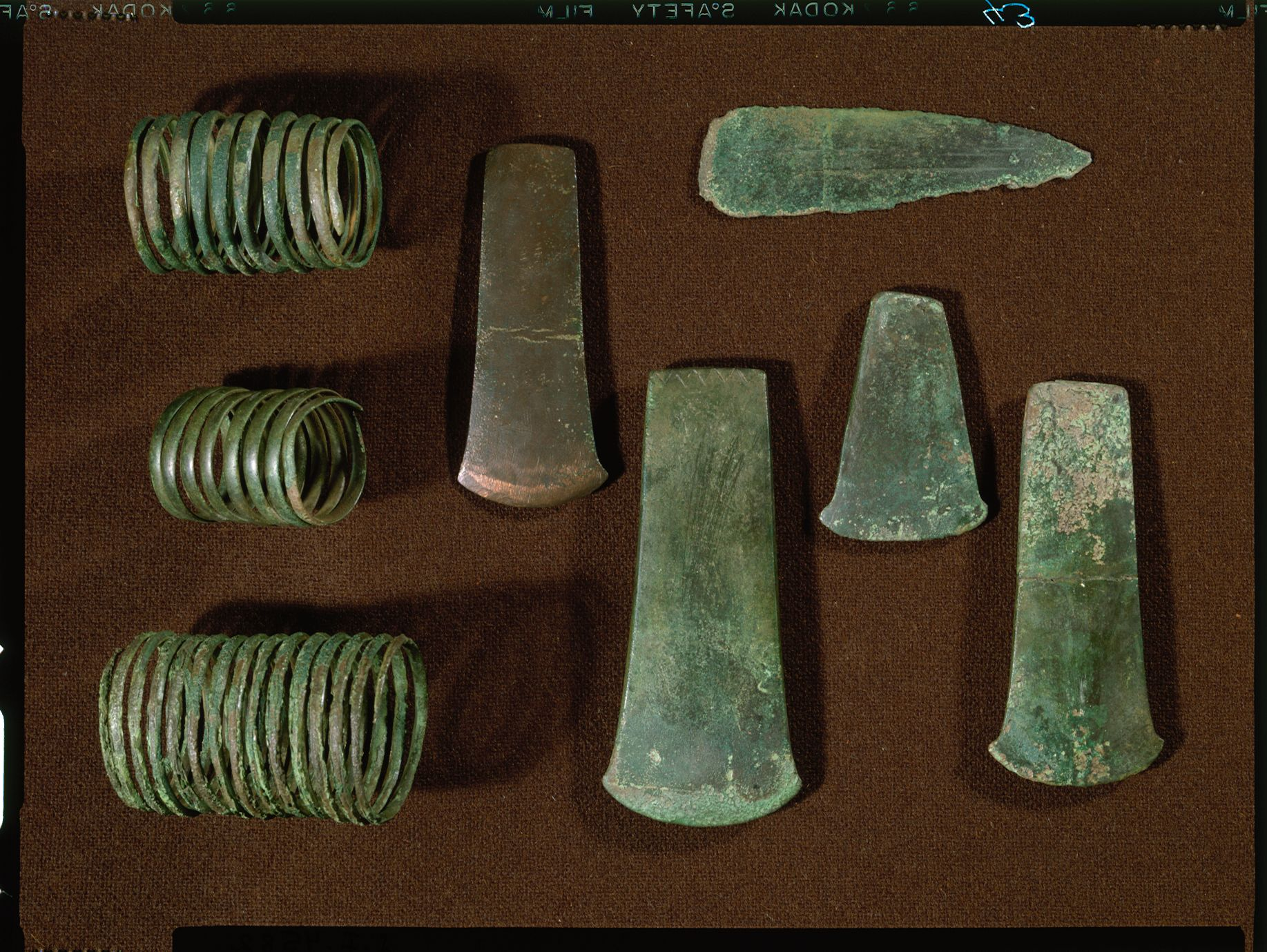
Copper artefacts, Funnelbeaker culture, Denmark, c. 3500 BC

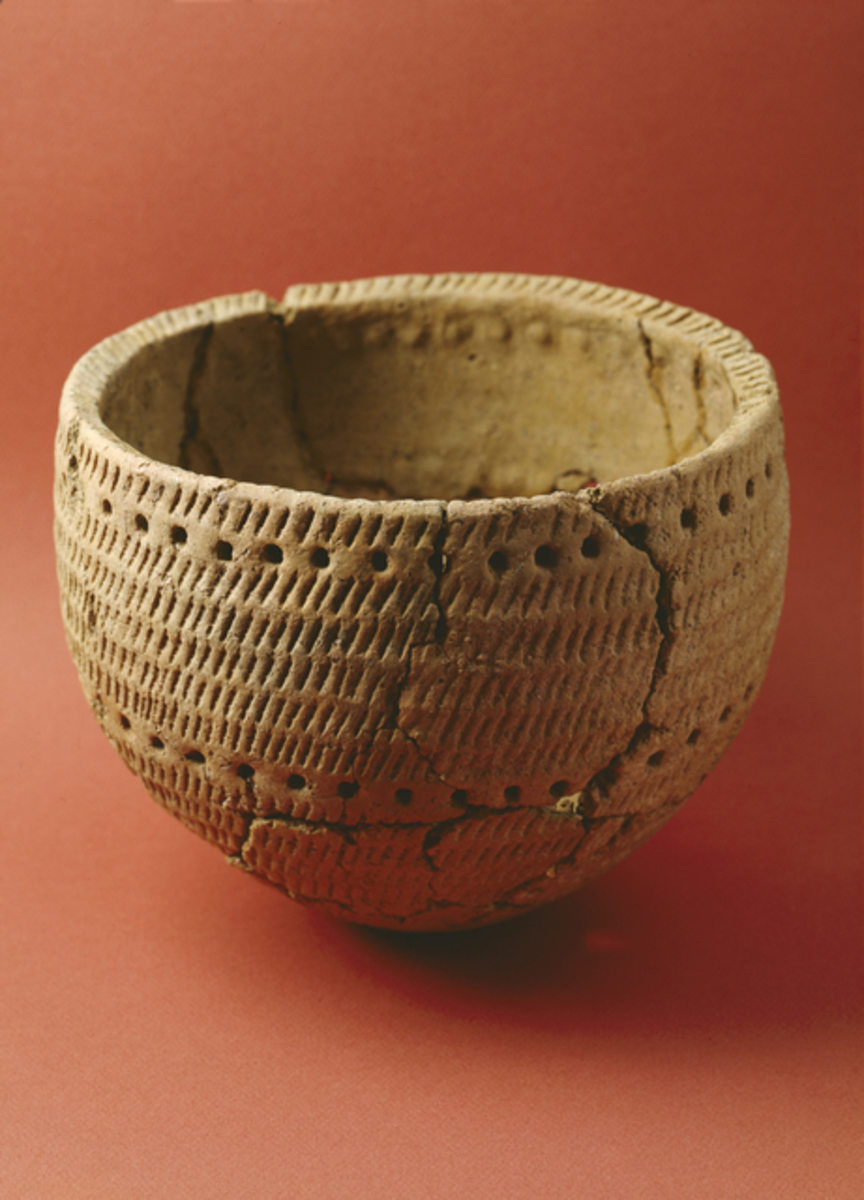
Comb Ceramic culture pottery, Finland

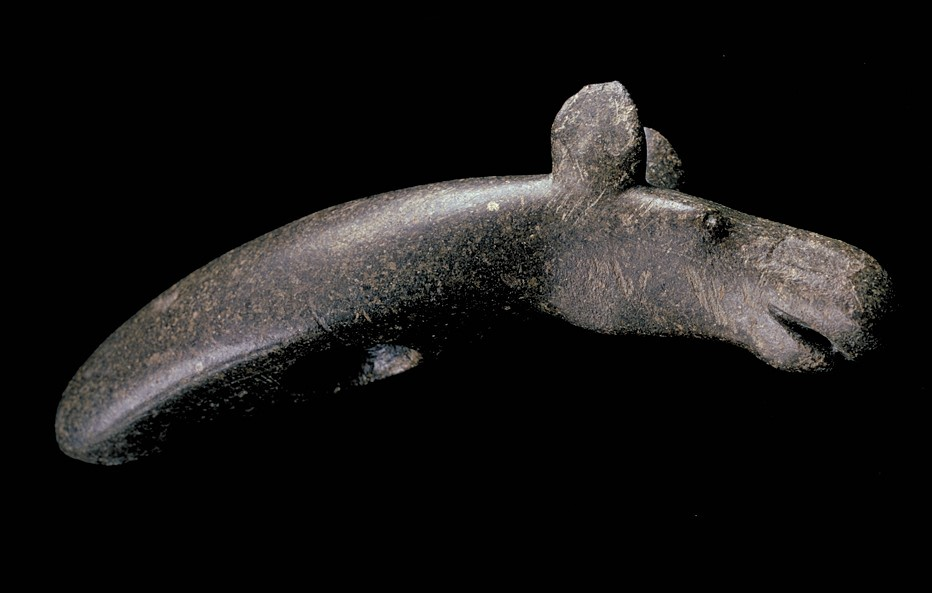
Ceremonial axe head (Alunda moose), c. 2500 BC

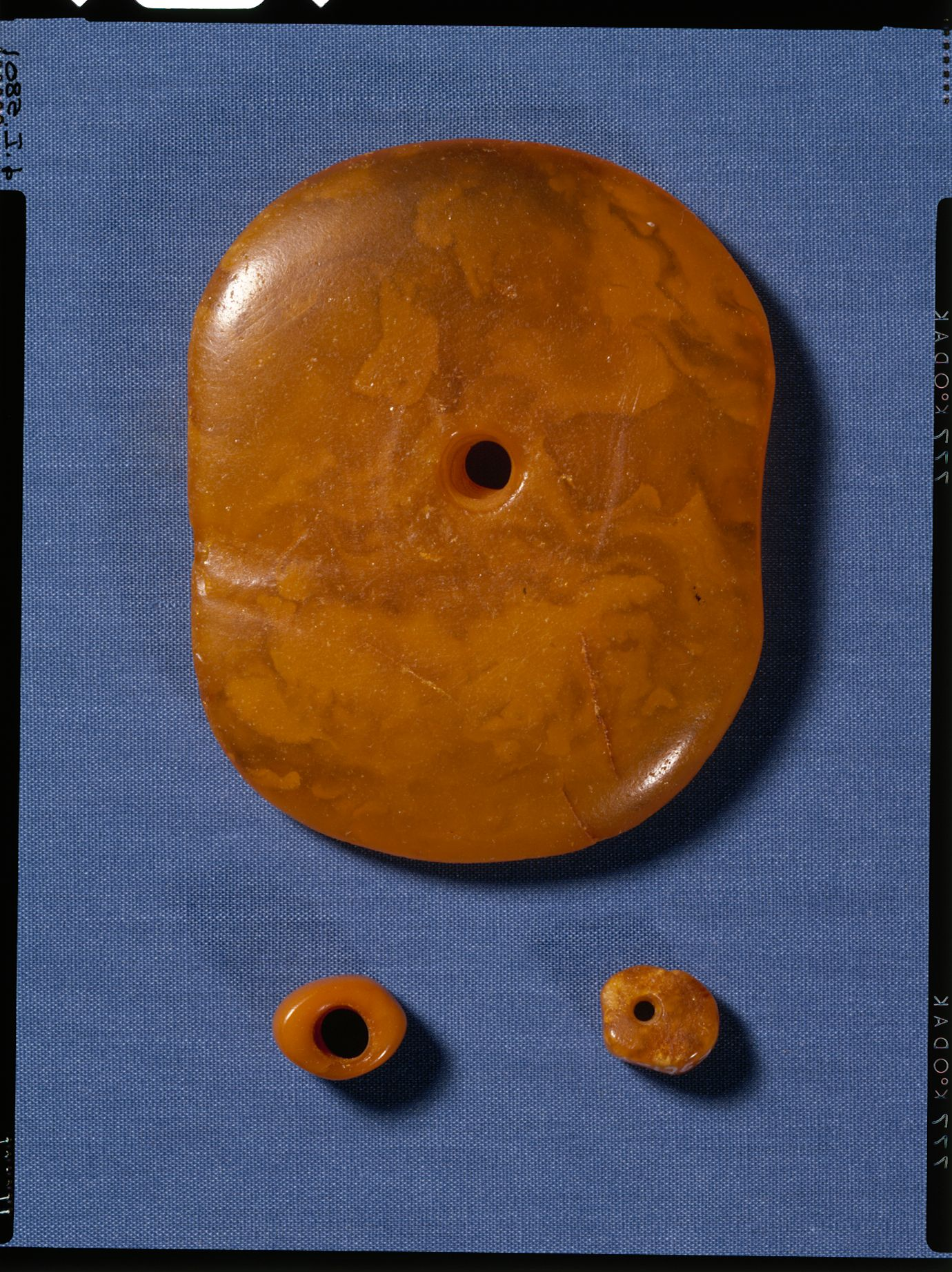
Amber disc and beads, Battle Axe culture, Denmark

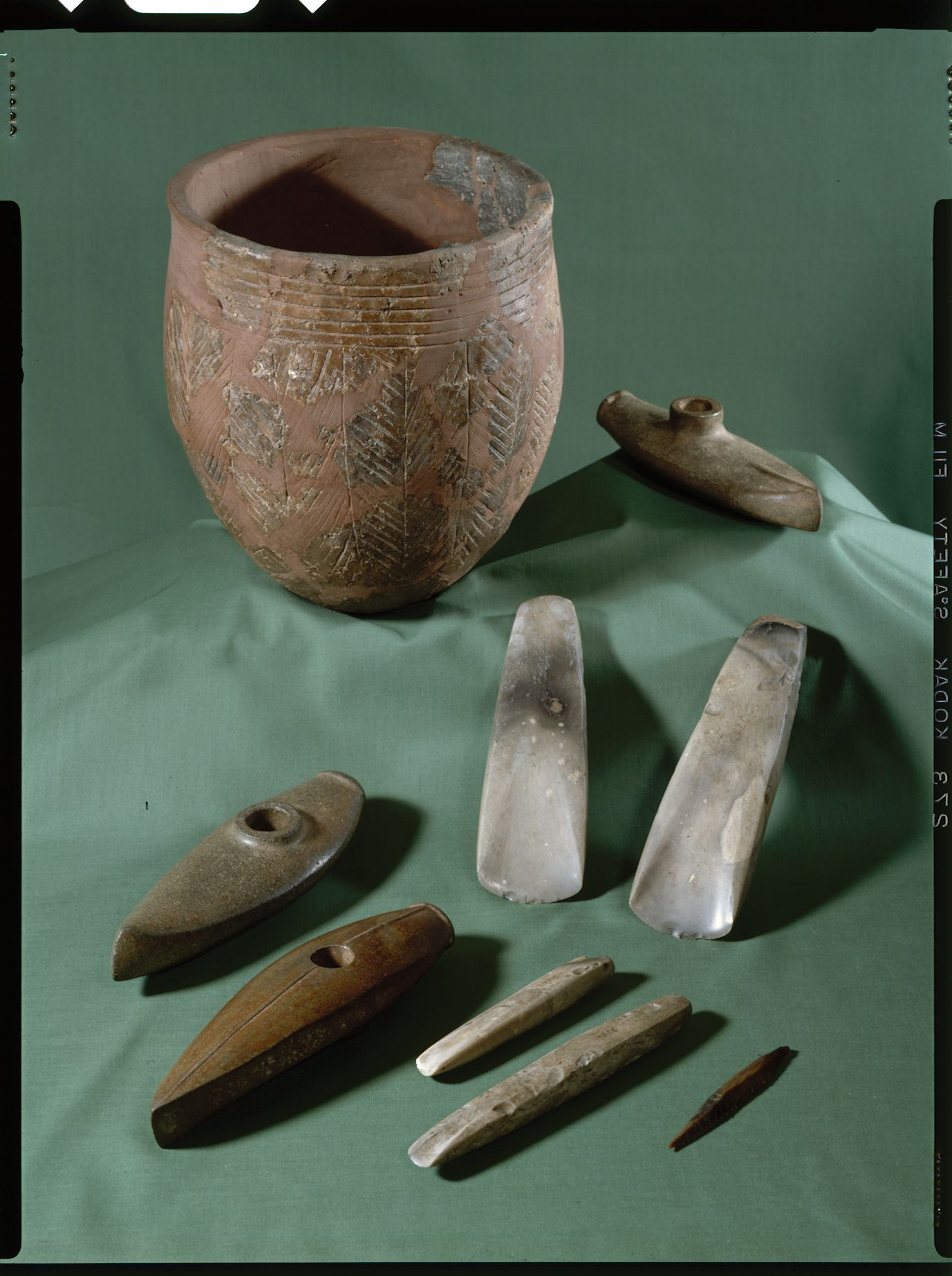
Single Grave culture artefacts, Denmark

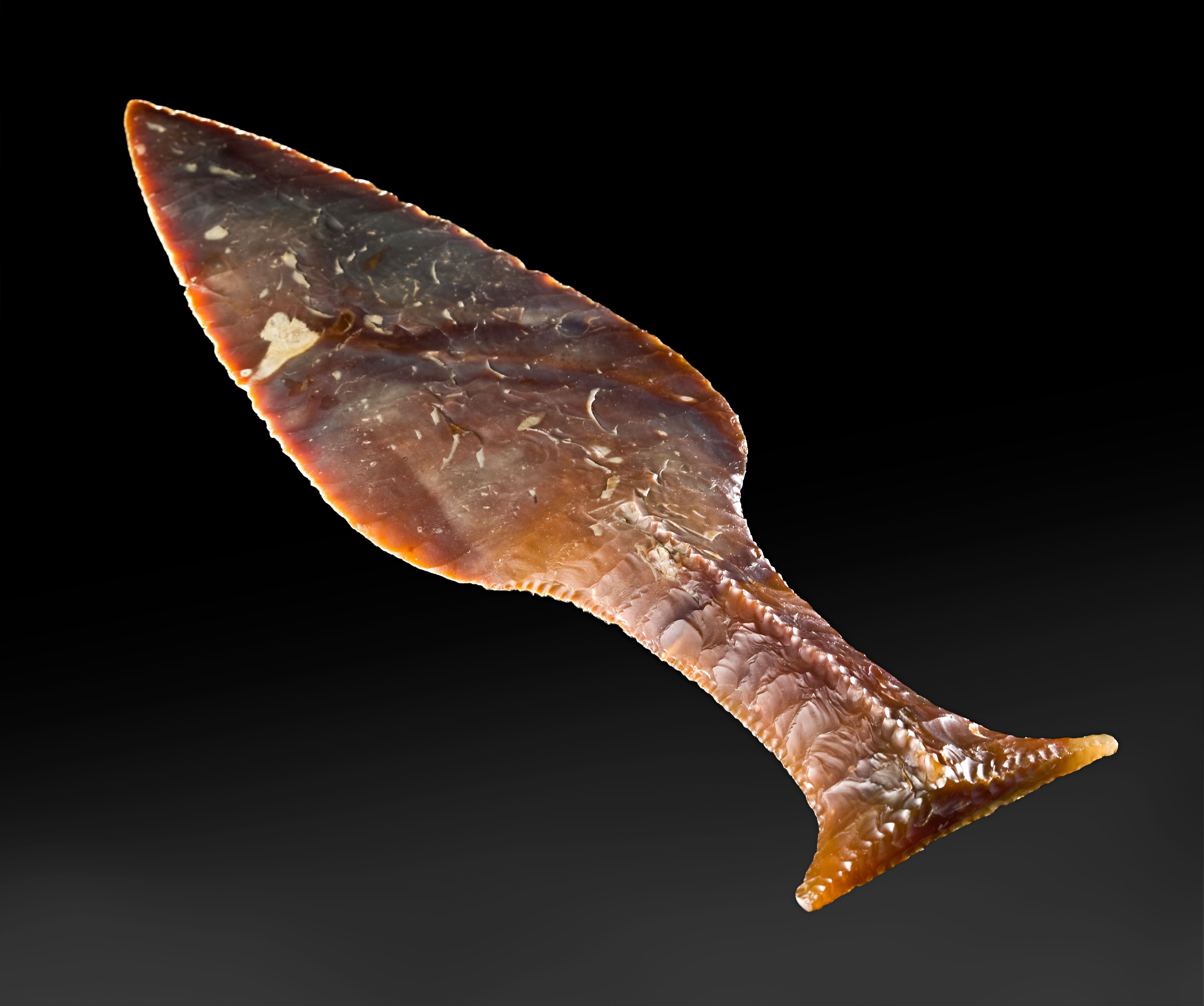
The Hindsgavl Dagger, a c. 30 cm flint dagger, c. 1900 – c. 1800 BC.

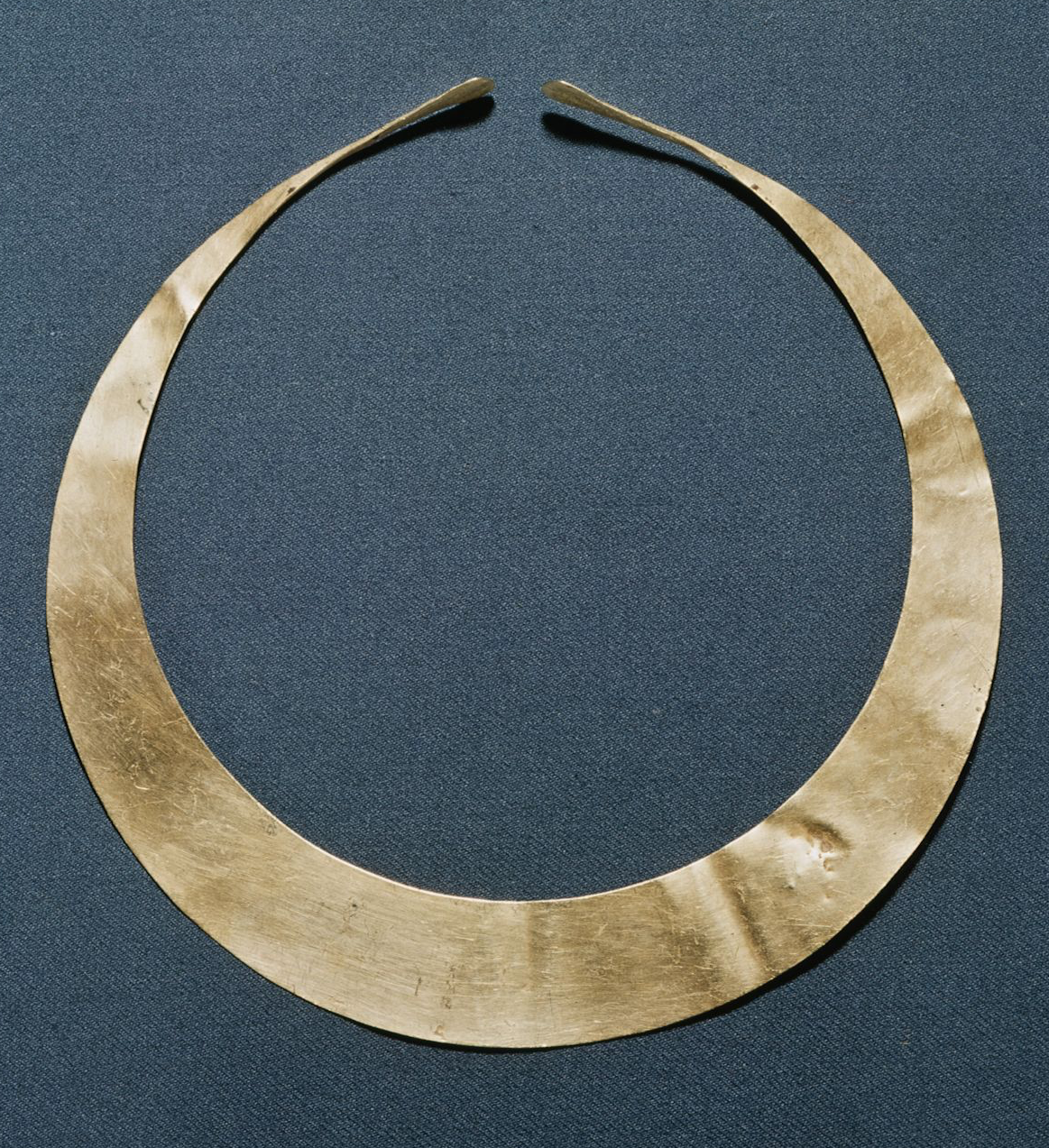
Gold lunula from Grevinge, Denmark, c. 2350 – c. 1950 BC.

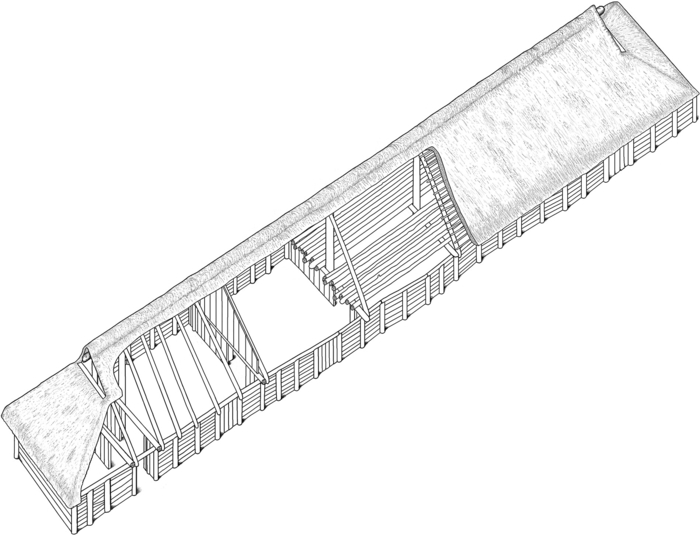
Late Neolithic longhouse, Denmark, c. 1900 BC.

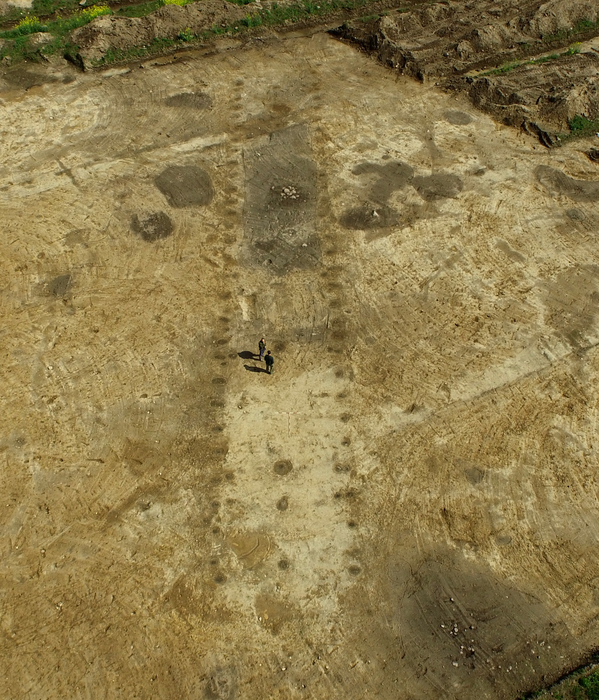
Late Neolithic longhouse remains, Denmark, c. 1900 BC.

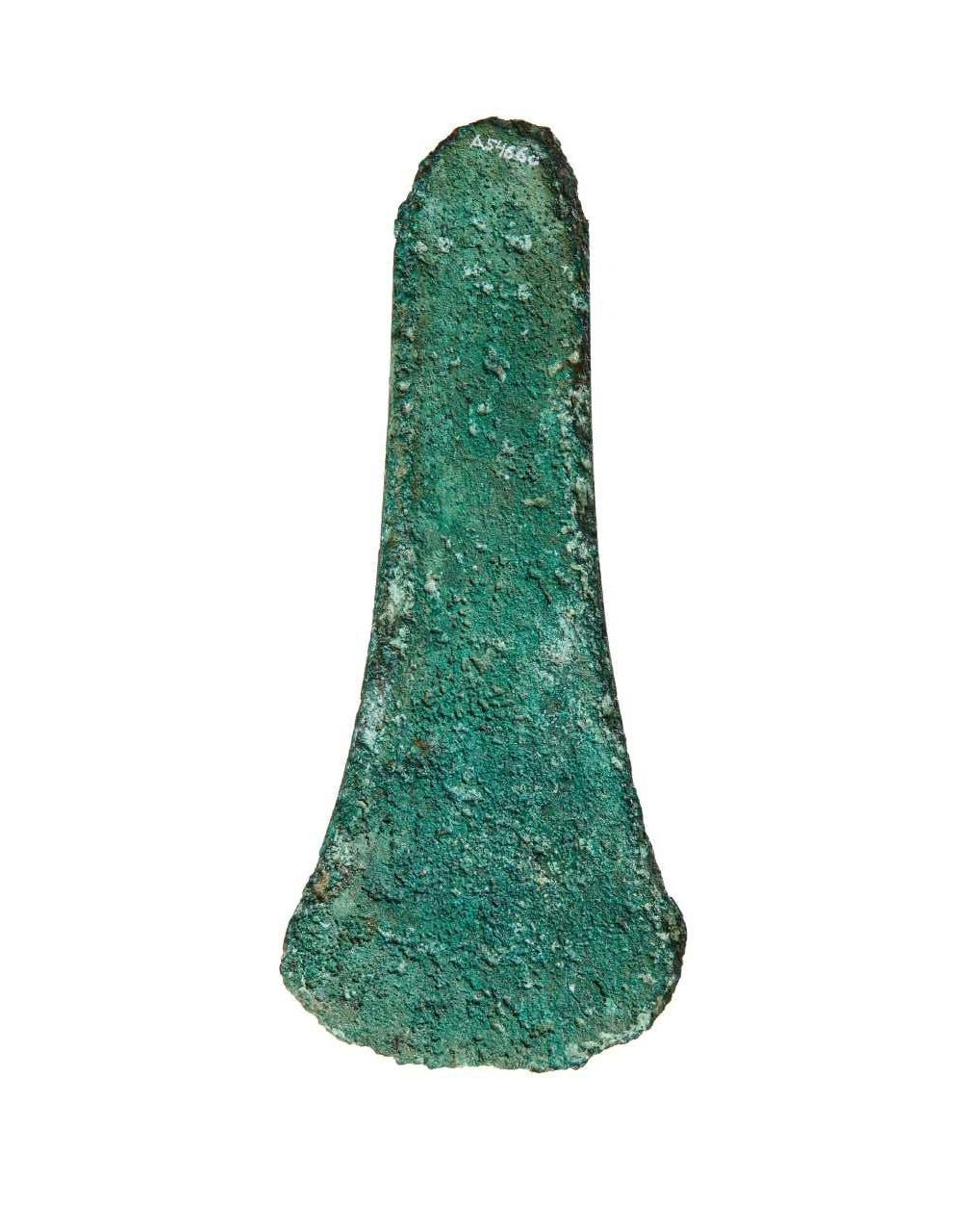
Bronze axe, Denmark, c. 1950 BC

== Bibliography ==
- T. Douglas Price (4 April 2015): "Ancient Scandinavia: An Archaeological History from the First Humans to the Vikings", Oxford University Press
- Marek Zvelebil (2009): "Hunters in Transition: Mesolithic Societies of Temperate Eurasia and Their Transition to Farming", Cambridge University Press
