= Battle Axe culture =

Chalcolithic European archaeological culture

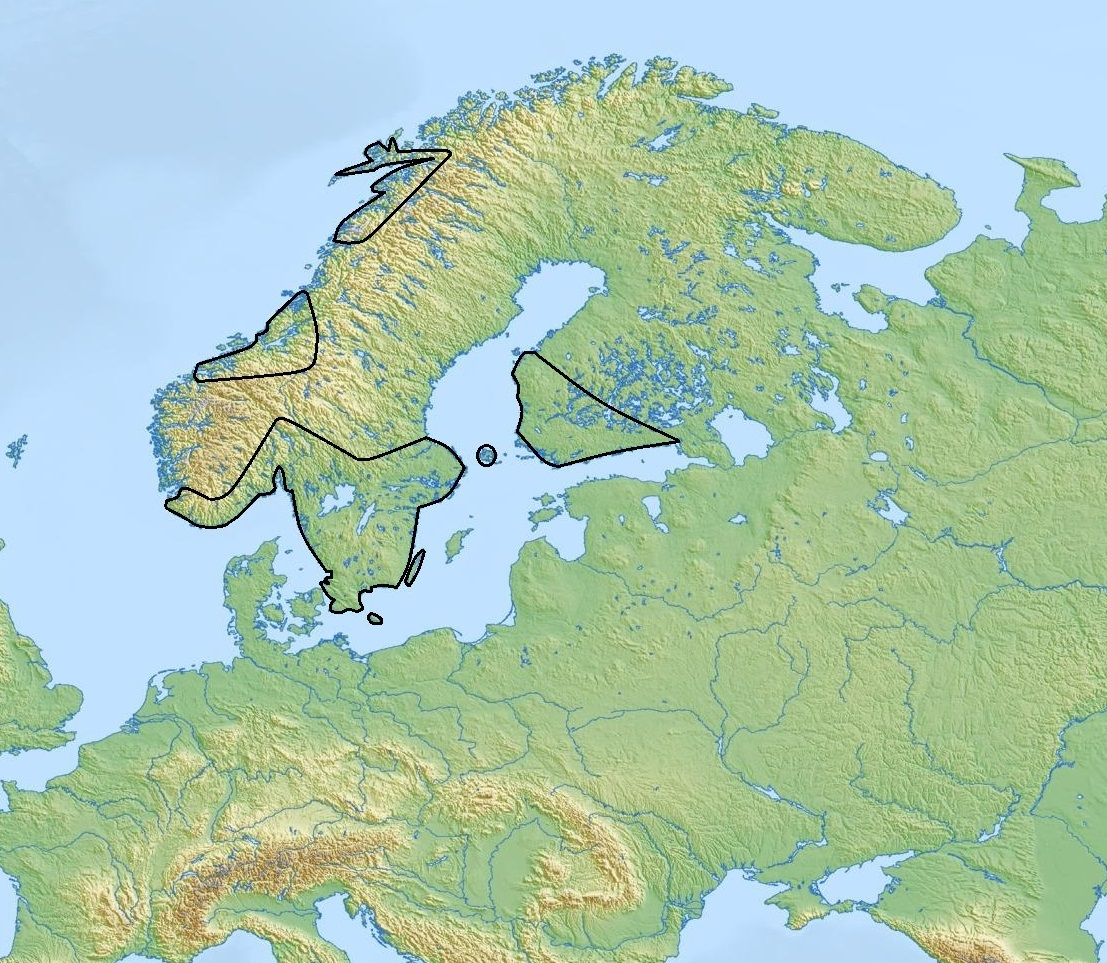
- Geographical range: Southern Scandinavian Peninsula and southwest Finland
- Period: Chalcolithic
- Dates: ca. 2800–2300 BC
- Preceded by: Corded Ware culture, Neolithic Scandinavia, Funnelbeaker culture, Pitted Ware culture
- Followed by: Nordic Bronze Age

The Battle Axe culture, also called Boat Axe culture, is a Chalcolithic culture that flourished in the coastal areas of the south of the Scandinavian Peninsula and southwest Finland, from c. 2800 BC – c. 2300 BC. It was an offshoot of the Corded Ware culture, and replaced the Funnelbeaker culture in southern Scandinavia, probably through a process of mass migration and population replacement. It is thought to have been responsible for spreading Indo-European languages and other elements of Indo-European culture to the region. It co-existed for a time with the hunter-gatherer Pitted Ware culture, which it eventually absorbed, developing into the Nordic Bronze Age. The Nordic Bronze Age has, in turn, been considered ancestral to the Germanic peoples.

== History ==
=== Origins ===
The Battle Axe culture emerged in the south of the Scandinavian Peninsula about 2800 BC. It was an offshoot of the Corded Ware culture, which was itself largely an offshoot of the Yamnaya culture of the Pontic–Caspian steppe. Modern genetic studies show that its emergence was accompanied by large-scale migrations and genetic displacement. The Battle Axe culture initially absorbed the agricultural Funnelbeaker culture.

=== Distribution ===
The concentration of the Battle Axe culture was in Scania. Sites of the Battle Axe culture have been found throughout the coastal areas of southern Scandinavia and southwest Finland. The immediate coastline was, however, occupied by the Pitted Ware culture. By 2300 BC, the Battle Axe culture had absorbed the Pitted Ware culture.

Throughout its existence, the Battle Axe culture appears to have expanded into coastal Norway, accompanied by dramatic cultural changes. Einar Østmo reports sites of the Battle Axe culture inside the Norwegian Arctic Circle in the Lofoten, and as far north as the present city of Tromsø.

=== Successors ===
The Battle Axe culture ended around 2300 BC. It was eventually succeeded by the Nordic Bronze Age, which appears to be a fusion of elements from the Battle Axe culture and the Pitted Ware culture.

== Characteristics ==
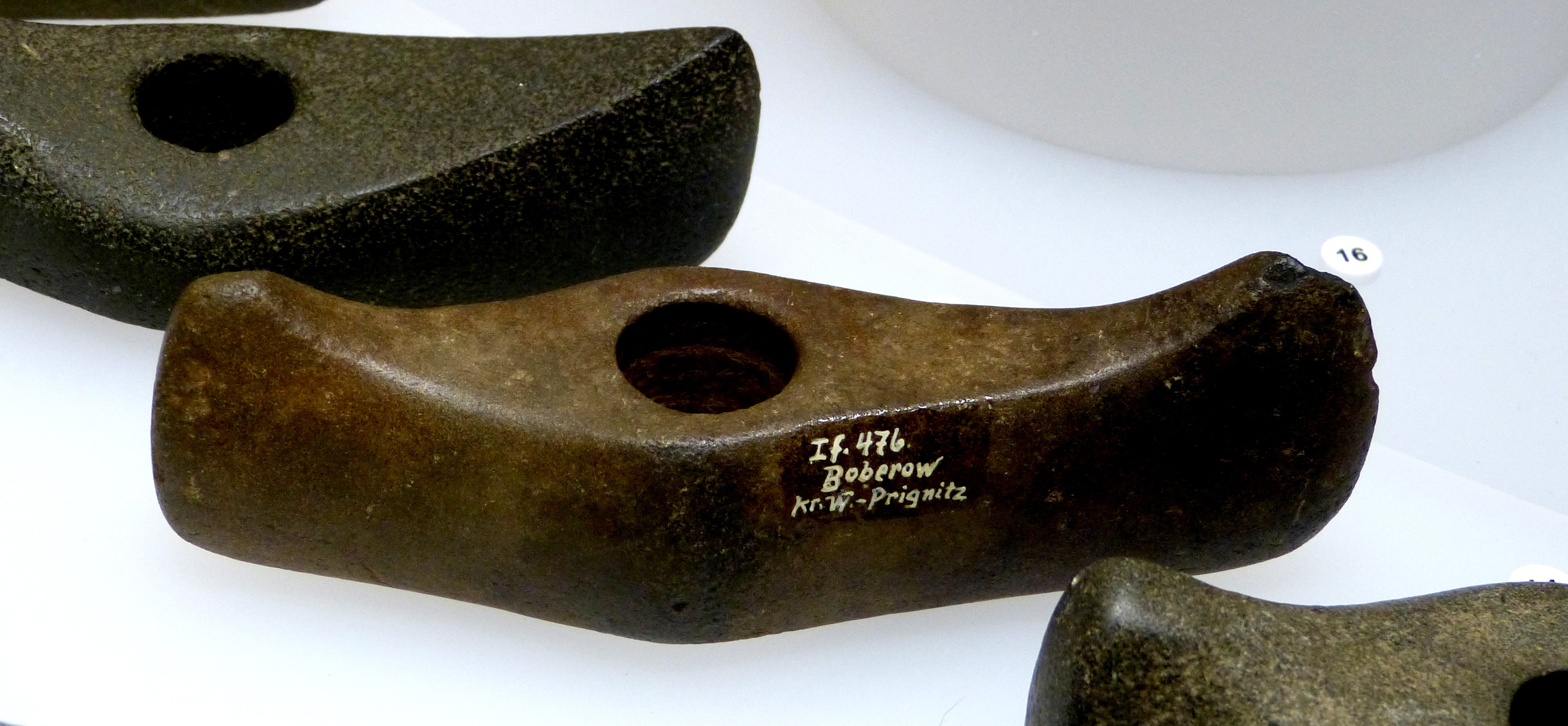
Boat-shaped battle axe, characteristic of Scandinavian and coastal-German Corded Ware.

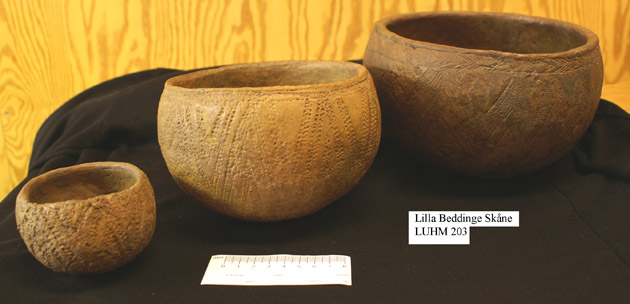
Battle Axe culture ceramics

=== Burials ===
The Battle Axe culture is mostly known for its burials. Around 250 Battle Axe burials have been found in Sweden. They are quite different from those found in the Single Grave culture of Denmark.

In the Battle Axe culture, the deceased were usually placed in a single flat grave with no barrow. Graves were typically oriented north-south, with the body in a flexed position facing towards the east. Men were placed on their left sides, while women were placed on their right sides. As regards both objects and placement, the grave goods are quite standardized. Axes of flint are found in both male and female burials. Battle axes are placed with males close to the head. These battle axes appear to have been status symbols, and it is from them that the culture is named. About 3000 battle axes have been found, in sites distributed over all of Scandinavia, but they are sparse in Norrland and northern Norway. The polished flint axes of the Battle Axe culture and the Pitted Ware culture trace a common origin in southwest Scania and Denmark. Corded Ware ceramics were also common grave goods in Battle Axe burials. They were usually placed near the head or feet. Other grave goods include arrowheads, weapons of antler, amber beads, and polished flint axes and chisels. Faunal remains from burials include red deer, sheep, and goat.

A new aspect was given to the Battle Axe culture in 1993, when a death house in Turinge, in Södermanland, was excavated. Along the once heavily timbered walls were found the remains of about twenty clay vessels, six work axes and a battle axe, which all came from the last period of the culture. There were also the cremated remains of at least six people. It is the earliest find of cremation in Scandinavia, and it shows close contacts with Central Europe.

=== Settlements ===
Few settlements of the Battle Axe culture have been uncovered. Most of them are located inland, but some are located in coastal areas. Battle Axe culture settlements are, however, not located directly on the coastline, which was rather occupied by the Pitted Ware culture. Less than 100 settlements are known, and their remains are negligible as they are located on continually used farmland, and have consequently been plowed away.

Archaeological remains of southern Sweden reveal close spatial relations between houses and graves, indicating that farms were central to social and economic activity in the Battle Axe culture.

=== Pottery ===
Battle Axe pottery has been found frequently in Pitted Ware settlements. Some settlements even display fusions of the pottery styles of the Battle Axe culture and Pitted Ware culture. The relationship between the two cultures is controversial and not well understood.

=== Culture ===
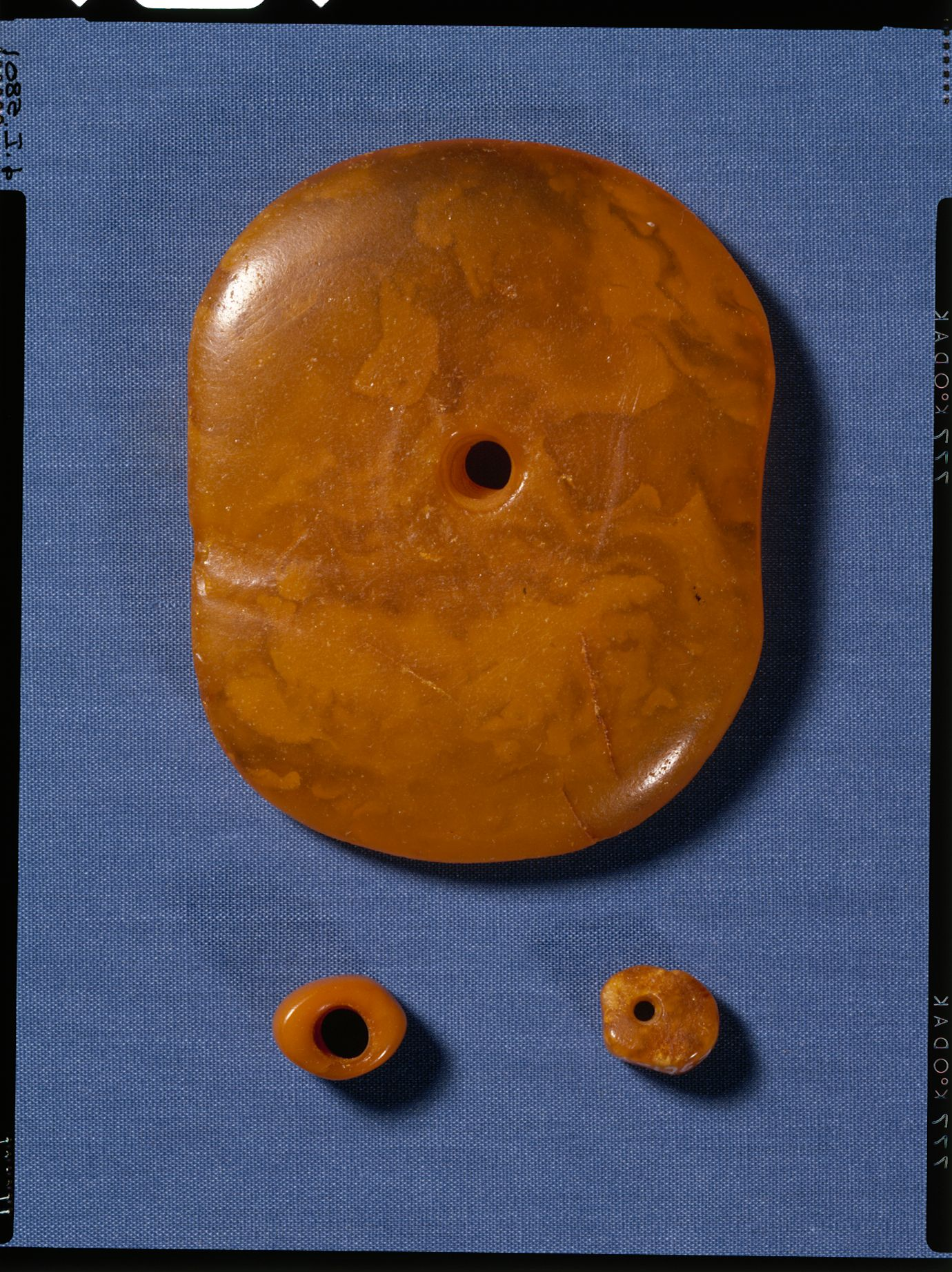
Amber disk and beads from Denmark

The social system of the Battle Axe culture was markedly different than that of the Funnelbeaker culture, shown by the fact that the Funnelbeaker culture had collective megalithic graves, each containing numerous sacrifices, while the Battle Axe culture had individual graves, with a single sacrifice each. Individualism appears to have played a much more prominent part in the Battle Axe culture than among its predecessors.

=== Economy ===
The Battle Axe culture was based on the same agricultural practices as the previous Funnelbeaker culture. The Battle Axe culture appears to have emphasized cattle herding, which explains the apparent mobile nature of the culture. They also appear to have engaged in trade with populations to their north, exchanging animal products for material goods.

Einar Østmo emphasizes that the Atlantic and North Sea coastal regions of Scandinavia, and the circum-Baltic areas were united by a vigorous maritime economy, permitting a far wider geographical spread and a closer cultural unity than interior continental cultures could attain. He points to the number of widely-disseminated rock carvings assigned to the era, which display "thousands" of ships. To such seafaring cultures, the sea is a highway and not a divider.

== Ethnicity ==
The Battle Axe culture is believed to have brought Indo-European languages and Indo-European culture to southern Scandinavia. The fusion of the Battle Axe culture with the native agricultural and hunter-gatherer cultures of the region spawned the Nordic Bronze Age, which is considered one of the ancestral civilization of the Germanic peoples.

== Gallery ==
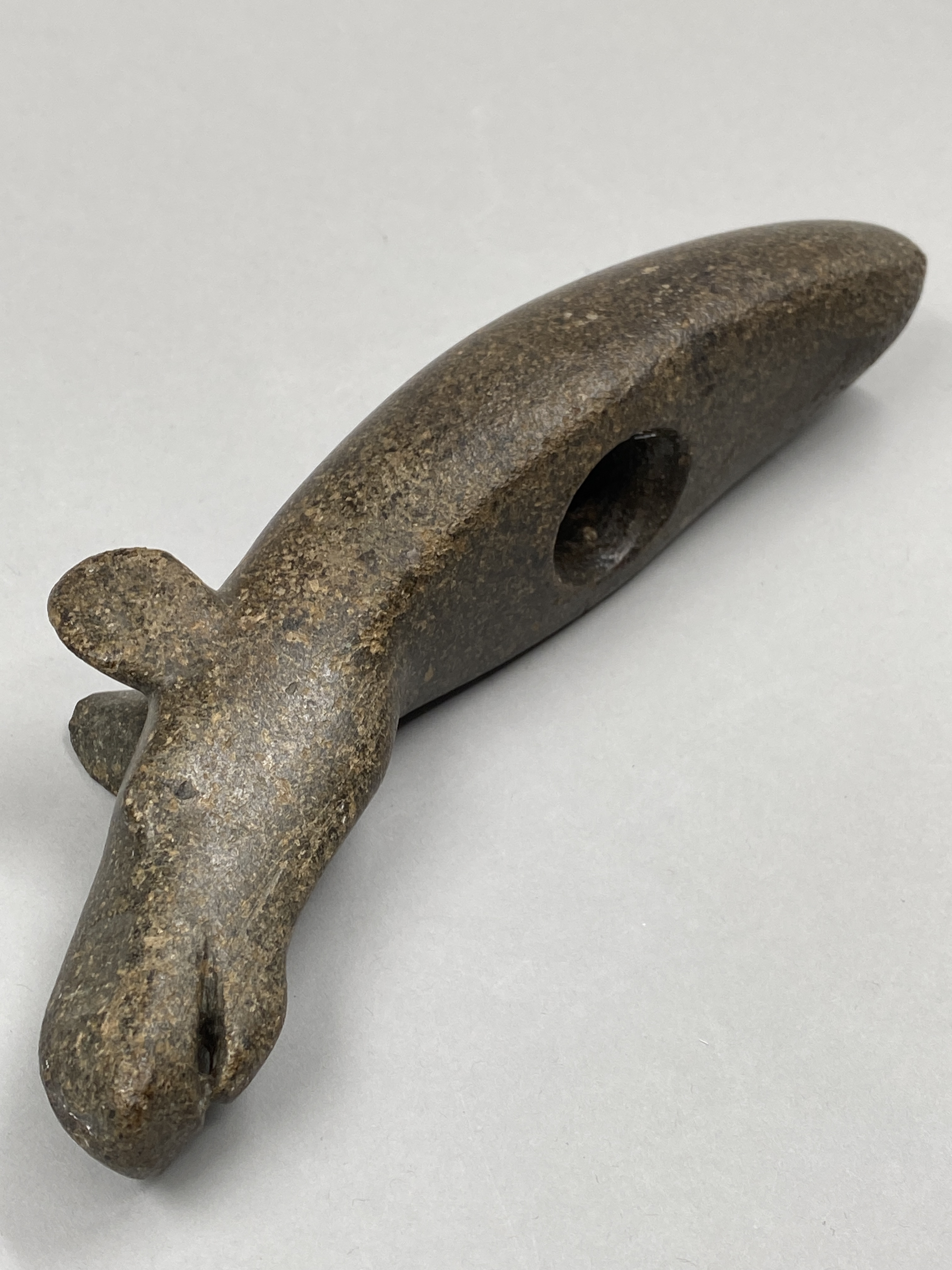
'Allunda Moose' ceremonial axe, Sweden, c. 2500 BC

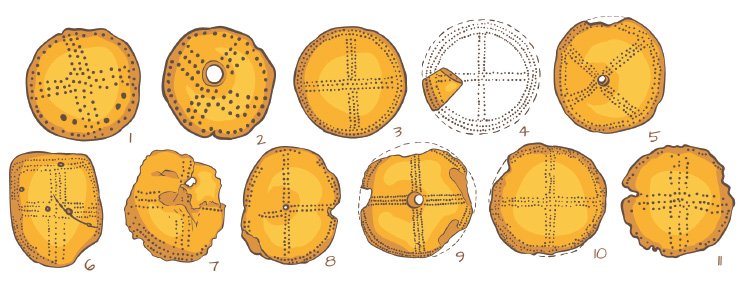
Amber 'sun discs'.

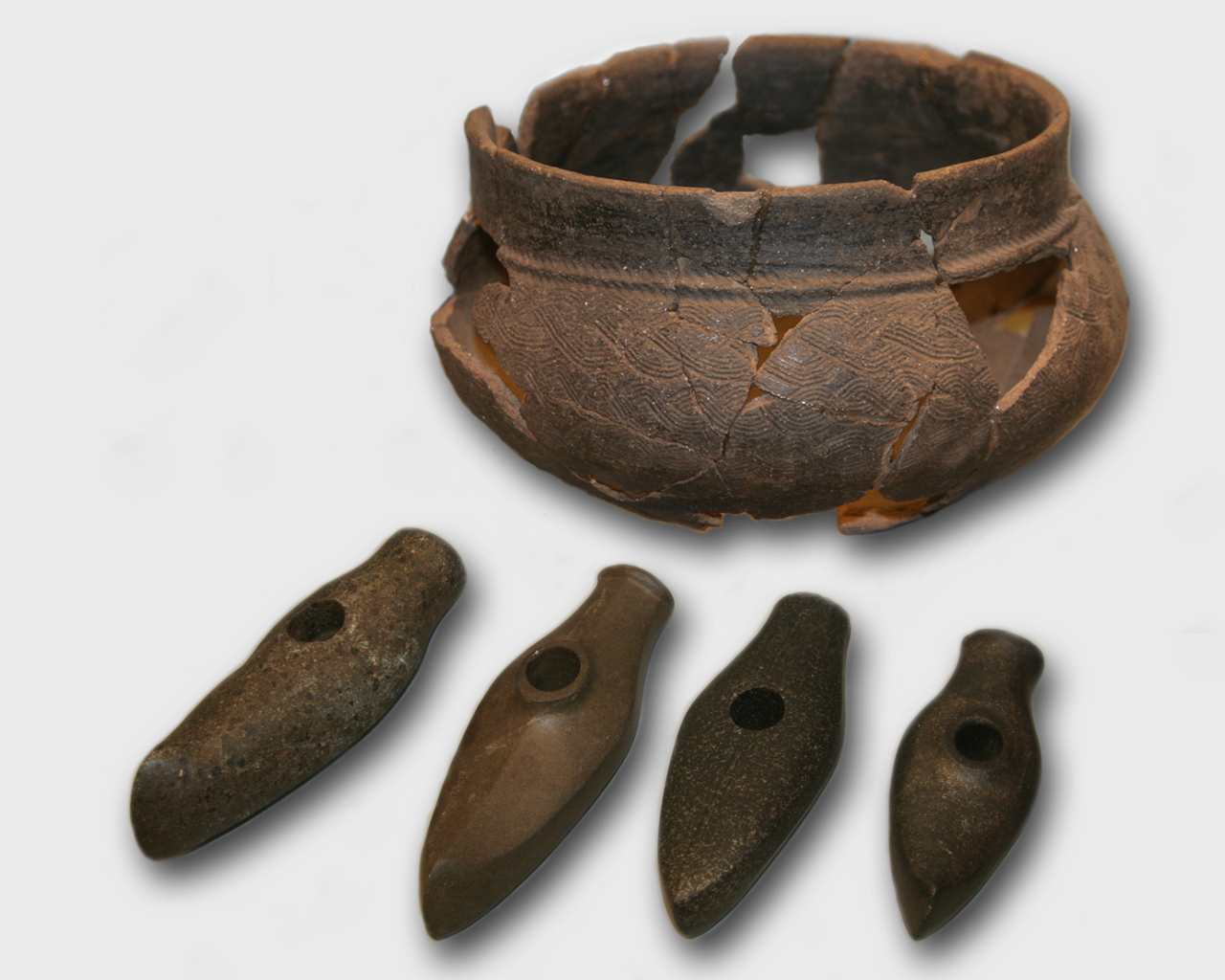
Deocrated pottery and axes from Estonia

== Genetics ==
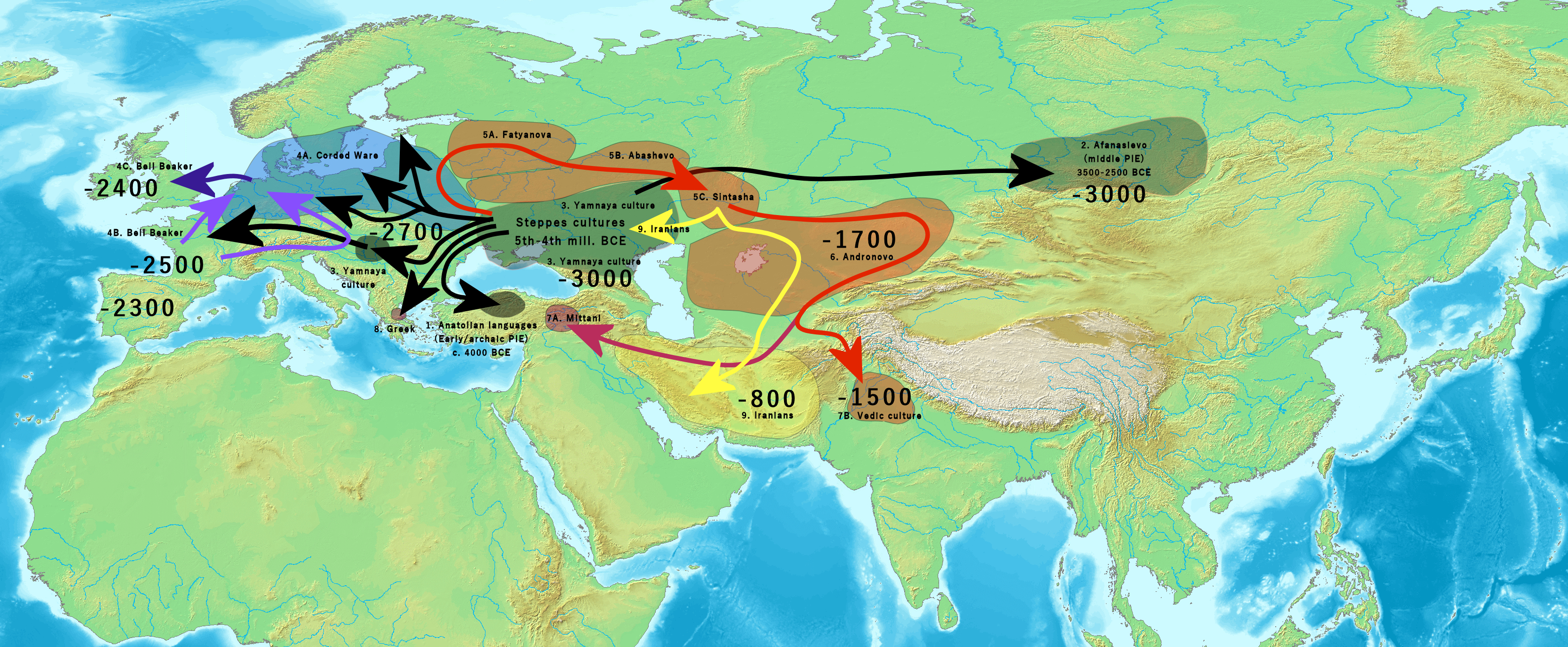
Early Indo-European migrations from the Pontic–Caspian steppe

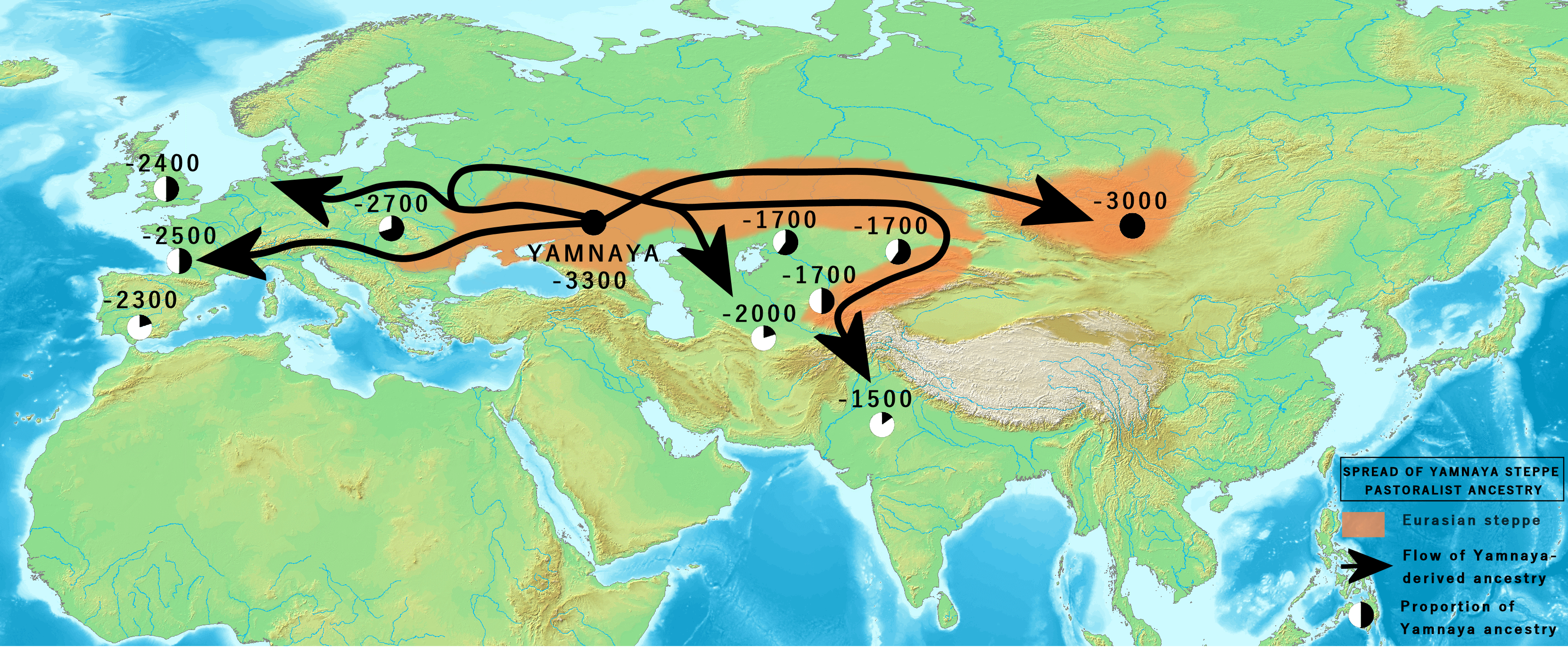
Bronze Age spread of Yamnaya Steppe pastoralist ancestry in 3000-1500 BC

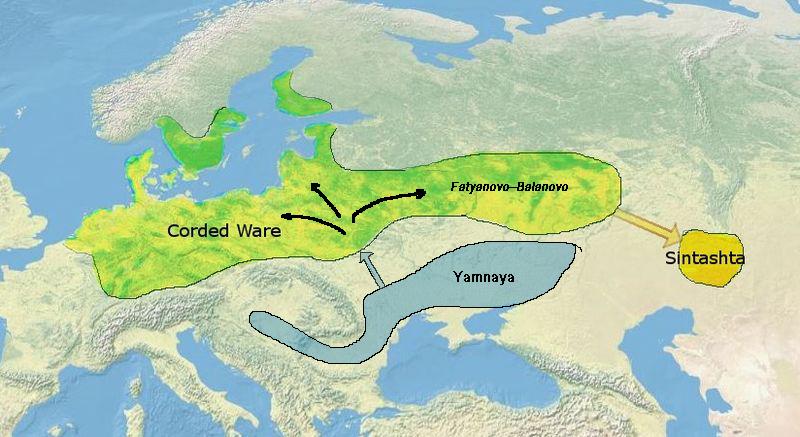
The Battle-Axe culture was an offshoot of the Corded Ware culture

A genetic study published in Nature in June 2015 examined the remains of a Battle Axe male buried in Viby, Sweden ca. 2621–2472 BC. He was found to be a carrier of the paternal haplogroup R1a1a1 and the maternal haplogroup K1a2a. People of the Late Neolithic and Bronze Age cultures of Scandinavia were found to be very closely related people of the Corded Ware culture, Bell Beaker culture and Únětice culture, all of whom shared genetic affinity with the Yamnaya culture. The Sintashta culture and Andronovo culture of Central Asia also displayed close genetic relations to the Corded Ware culture.

A genetic study published in Nature Communications in January 2018 examined a male buried in Ölsund in northern Sweden ca. 2570–2140. Although buried without artifacts, he was found close to an archaeological site containing both hunter-gatherer and Corded Ware artifacts. He was found to be a carrier of the paternal haplogroup R1a1a1b and the maternal haplogroup U4c2a. He was found to be genetically similar to peoples of the Battle Axe culture, carrying a large amount of steppe-related ancestry. The paternal haplogroup R1a1a1b was also found to be the predominant lineage among Corded Ware and Bronze Age males of the eastern Baltic.

A genetic study published in Proceedings of the Royal Society B examined the remains of 2 Battle Axe individuals buried in Bergsgraven in central Sweden. The male carried the paternal haplogroup R1a-Z283 and the maternal haplogroup U4c1a, while the female carried the maternal haplogroup N1a1a1a1. Haplogroup R1a is the most common paternal haplogroup among males from other cultures of the Corded Ware horizon, and has earlier been found among Eastern Hunter-Gatherers (EHGs). Interestingly, the Yamnaya culture is on the other hand dominated by the paternal haplogroup R1b. The two Battle Axe individuals examined were found to be closely related to peoples from other parts of the Corded Ware horizon. They were mostly of Western Steppe Herder (WSH) descent, although with slight Western Hunter-Gatherer (WHG) and Early European Farmer (EEF) admixture. The admixture appears to have occurred through mating of WSH males with EEF and WHG females. The ancestry of the Battle Axe individuals was markedly different from that of previous Neolithic populations, suggesting stratification among the cultural groups. WSH ancestry has not been detected among previous populations of the area. The results further underpinned the notion that the Battle Axe culture emerged as a result of migrations from southeast of the Baltic. The study also examined a female buried in a Funnelbeaker megalith in Öllsjö, Sweden c. 2860–2500 BC, during which the area was part of the Battle Axe culture. She carried the maternal haplogroup H6a1b3, and was found to be closely genetically related to other people of the Battle Axe culture. Two individuals buried in the same megalith during the Late Neolithic were likewise closely related to peoples of the Corded Ware culture.

Malmström et al. (2020) examined Pitted Ware culture individuals of Gotland. Several of their burials contained typical Battle Axe artifacts. However, none of these individuals harbored any admixture from the Battle Axe culture, suggesting that peoples of the two cultures interacted without interbreeding. Modern Northern Europeans were found to be still closely genetically related to people of the Battle Axe culture.

== See also ==
- Single Grave culture
- Bell Beaker culture
- Middle Dnieper culture
- Fatyanovo–Balanovo culture
- Rzucewo culture
- Sintashta culture

== Sources ==
- Allentoft, Morten E.; et al. (June 10, 2015). "Population genomics of Bronze Age Eurasia". Nature. 522 (7555). Nature Research: 167–172. Bibcode:2015Natur.522..167A. doi:10.1038/nature14507. PMID 26062507. S2CID 4399103.
- Mallory, J. P.; Adams, Douglas Q. (1997). Encyclopedia of Indo-European Culture. Taylor & Francis. ISBN 978-1-884964-98-5.
- Malmström, Helena; et al. (October 9, 2019). "The genomic ancestry of the Scandinavian Battle Axe Culture people and their relation to the broader Corded Ware horizon". Proceedings of the Royal Society B. 286 (1912) 20191528. Royal Society. doi:10.1098/rspb.2019.1528. PMC 6790770. PMID 31594508.
- Malmström, Helena; et al. (June 4, 2020). "The Neolithic Pitted Ware culture foragers were culturally but not genetically influenced by the Battle Axe culture herders". American Journal of Physical Anthropology. 172 (4). American Association of Physical Anthropologists: 638–649. doi:10.1002/ajpa.24079. PMID 32497286.
- Mathieson, Iain; et al. (February 21, 2018). "The genomic history of southeastern Europe". Nature. 555 (7695). Nature Research: 197–203. Bibcode:2018Natur.555..197M. doi:10.1038/nature25778. PMC 6091220. PMID 29466330.
- Mittnik, Alissa; et al. (January 30, 2018). "The genetic prehistory of the Baltic Sea region". Nature Communications. 9 (442). Nature Research: 442. Bibcode:2018NatCo...9..442M. doi:10.1038/s41467-018-02825-9. PMC 5789860. PMID 29382937.
- Price, T. Douglas (2015). Ancient Scandinavia: An Archaeological History from the First Humans to the Vikings. Oxford University Press. ISBN 978-0-19-023197-2.
- Schmidt, Karl Horst [in German] (1991). "The Celts and the Ethnogenesis of the Germanic People". Historische Sprachforschung. 104 (1). Vandenhoeck & Ruprecht: 129–152. JSTOR 40849016.
- Østmo, Einar [in Norwegian] (1991). "A local ship picture tradition of the Bronze and Early Iron Ages in southeast Norway: New evidence from rock carvings at Dalbo". World Archaeology. 23 (2). Routledge: 220–232. doi:10.1080/00438243.1991.9980174.
- Zvelebil, Marek (1997). "Pitted Ware And Related Cultures Of Neolithic Northern Europe". In Bogucki, Peter I.; Crabtree, Pam J. (eds.). Ancient Europe 8000 B.C.- A.D. 1000. Encyclopedia of the Barbarian World. Vol. 1. Scribner. pp. 431–435. ISBN 0-684-80669-X.
