= Alvastra pile-dwelling =

Dwelling from about 3000 BC in Östergötland County, Sweden

Coordinates: 58°17′N 14°41′E

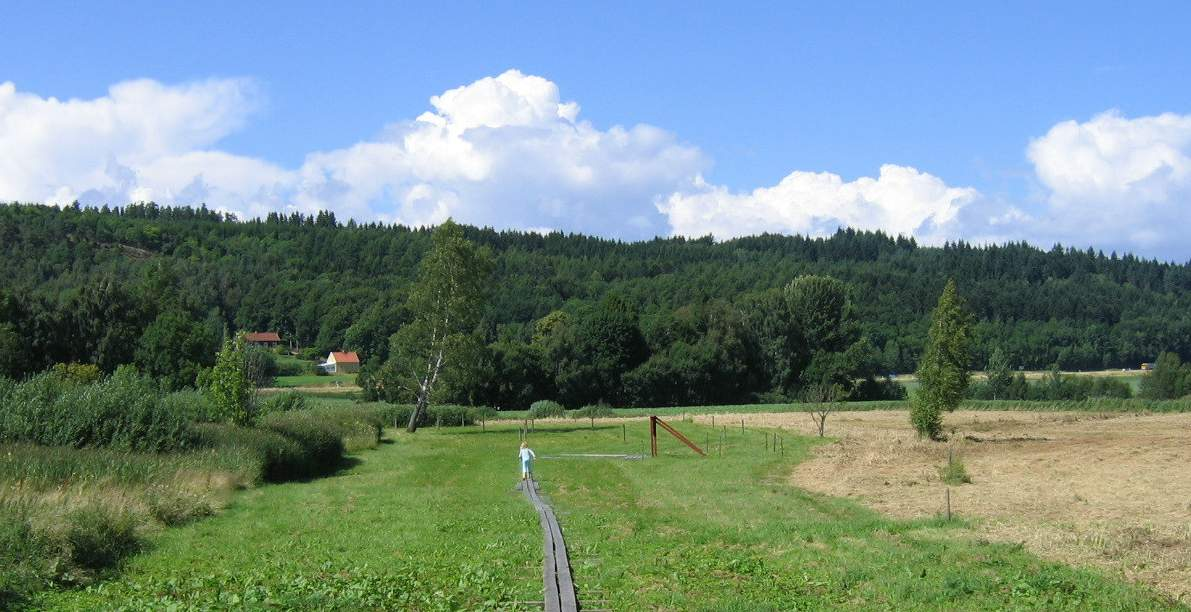
The location of the pile dwelling as seen in 2005

The Alvastra pile-dwelling (Swedish: Alvastra pålbyggnad or Alvastraboplatsen) is a pile dwelling (also called a stilt house) from ca 3000 BC in Alvastra, Ödeshög Municipality, Östergötland County, Sweden. Southern Scandinavia has many types of cult centres, but the Alvastra pile dwelling is unique in Northern Europe and is the only of its kind outside of the Alpine Pile Dweller culture. It was the seasonal social and religious centre of a tribe that left objects from the Funnelbeaker culture, but pottery from the Pitted Ware culture, in the dwelling. After excavations in 1908–19, 1928–39 and 1976–80, two thirds of the site was surveyed by archaeologists.

== Construction ==
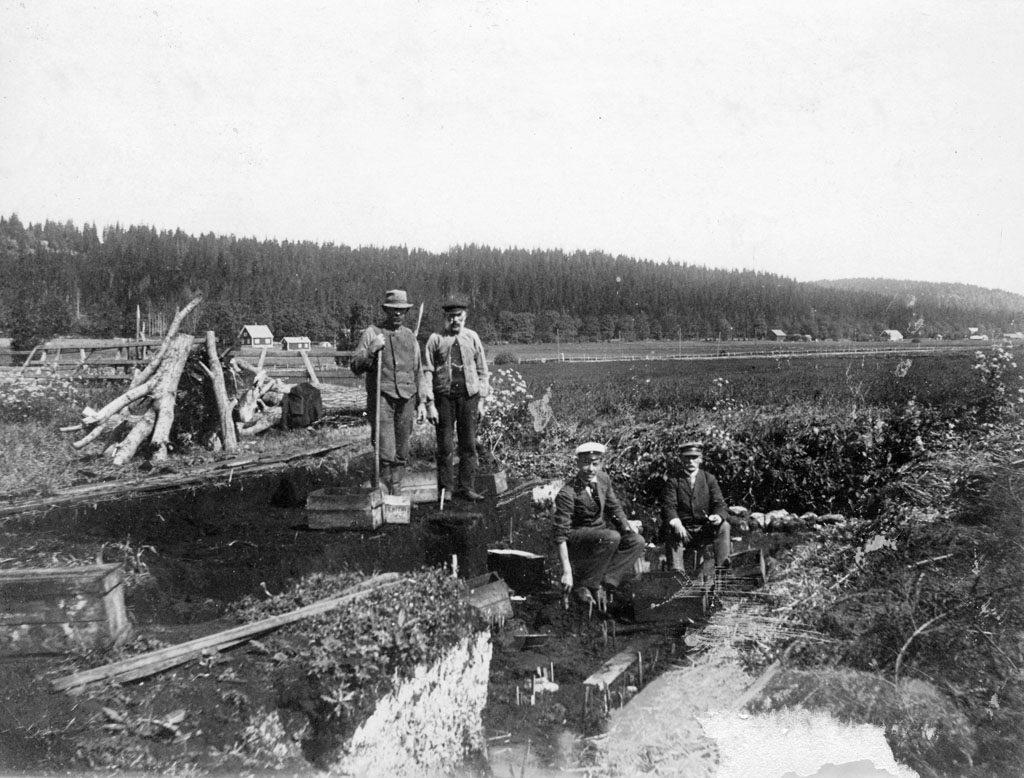
The excavation in 1914

The archaeologists found stilts made of deciduous trees, notably oak, hazel, elm and crabapple. A dendrochronological study showed that the construction had proceeded in two stages during 18 years, and after a break of 22 years, the work had been finished 40–42 years after the work had begun.

During the first years, the construction consisted of two rectangular surfaces, which were delimited by rows of oak stakes and the surfaces were placed in an oblique angle. Each rectangle was ca 200 m^{2} and were separated into eight or nine rooms. Most of the rooms had floors of logs. The reconstructions and the additions were partly motivated by fires, and the construction finally measured 1000 m^{2}. The construction was connected with the shore by footbridges on both sides.

The size of the pile dwelling indicates that it was a communal work. It was also no fortification, because the stilts are too sparse and pushed into the bottom of the swamp too shallowly. The location in the swamp is also unfit for practical work, and the settlements were located on the arable soil around the swamp.

== Early use as a cult centre ==
The pile dwelling was only inhabited during certain summer months. It was the tribe's or the clan's social centre where they gathered for festivities, especially after the summer's hunting and harvesting season. There are about 100 hearths of limestone evenly distributed across the dwelling, which shows that there were no permanent houses, only huts supported by the many hazel stilts. Around the hearths, there is an abundance of residue from meals, charred wheat and barley, split and charred crabapples, hazel nut shells, bone of cattle, sheep and pigs. There are remains of game, such as red deer, moose, wolf, and bear, remains from birds such as mallard and black grouse, and remains of fish such as northern pike and perch.

The ceramics are the same as those of the hunter-gatherer Pitted Ware culture, but tools and weapons are the same as those of the Funnelbeaker culture. The remains of craftmanship are few, and so the tools have been transported to the pile dwelling from the workshops, where they were probably sacrificed to the gods.

Among the most remarkable finds are double edged battle axes, which appear to have played a role in the cult.

== Late use as a grave ==
After the reconstruction, year 40–42, the construction was used as a cemetery, where the dead appear to have been left on platforms raised on stilts.

== See also ==
- Prehistoric pile dwellings around the Alps
- Post in ground
