= Alunda moose =

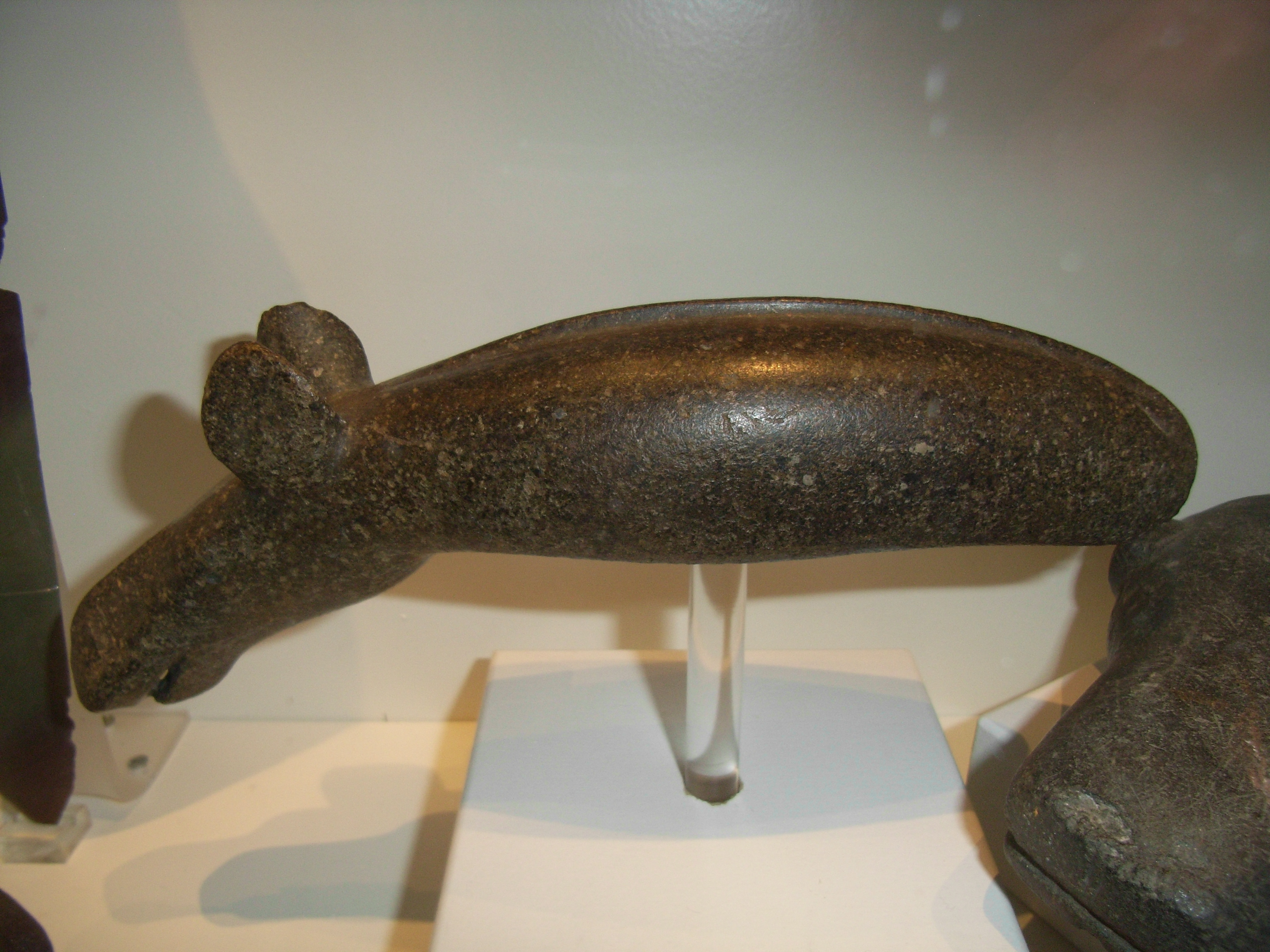
Alunda moose at the Swedish History Museum

The Alunda moose or the Alunda axe is a Neolithic stone axe c.2500 B.C.that was found during the excavation of a ditch in Norrlövsta i Alunda parish, Östhammar Municipality, Uppland in 1920. The Alunda moose is considered one of the most beautiful animal sculptures of the Nordic neolithic and is a 21 cm. ceremonial axe carved from greenish black diorite. One side is shaped like a moose head. The sculpture was realized in a naturalistic and elegant manner. The axe has a shaft hole but only had a symbolic function since the hole is not completely bored through and the axe hasn't been used in battle. The axe may originate from Karelia where similar animal depictions are known. It is displayed in the Swedish History Museum.

== See also ==
- List of Stone Age art
