= Sarauw =

Sarauw is a Danish surname. Notable people with the surname include:

- Anna Sarauw (1839–1919), Danish textile artist
- Georg F.L. Sarauw (1862–1928), Danish-Swedish botanist and archaeologist
- Janelle K. Sarauw (born 1985), Virgin Islander politician
- Paul Sarauw (1883–1959), Danish screenwriter
