= Grahame Clark =

British archaeologist (1907–1995)

Sir Grahame Clark CBE FBA FSA
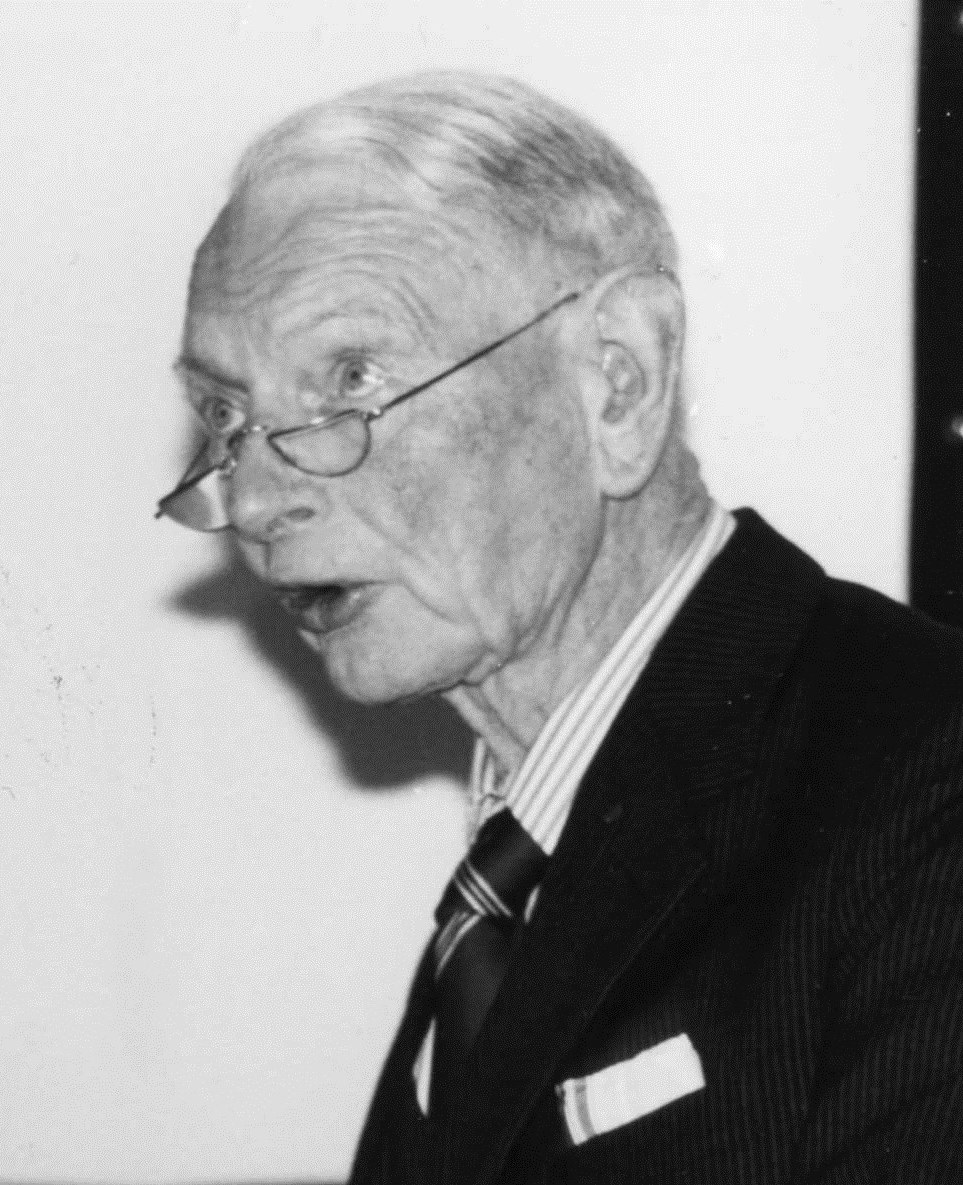
- Born: John Grahame Douglas Clark; 28 July 1907; Bromley, England
- Died: 12 September 1995 (aged 88); Cambridge, England
- Citizenship: United Kingdom

Academic background
- Education: Peterhouse, Cambridge

Academic work
- Sub-discipline: Prehistory; Mesolithic; culture-historical archaeology; environmental archaeology
- Institutions: Peterhouse, Cambridge; Department of Anthropology and Archaeology, University of Cambridge

Sir John Grahame Douglas Clark CBE FBA FSA (28 July 1907 – 12 September 1995), who often published as J. G. D. Clark, was a British archaeologist who specialised in the study of Mesolithic Europe and palaeoeconomics. He spent most of his career working at the University of Cambridge, where he was appointed Disney Professor of Archaeology from 1952 to 1974 and Master of Peterhouse from 1973 to 1980.

Born in Kent to an upper-middle-class family, Clark developed an early interest in archaeology through his collection of prehistoric flint tools. After an education at Marlborough College, he proceeded to Peterhouse in the University of Cambridge, there attaining both his undergraduate and then doctoral degree. For the latter, he produced a thesis and published monograph focusing on Mesolithic Britain. In 1932, he co-founded the Fenland Research Committee, through which he excavated several prehistoric sites in the East Anglian Fens. He was also a senior member of the Prehistoric Society of East Anglia and played an instrumental role in transforming it into The Prehistoric Society in 1935. He served as the editor of its academic journal, the Proceedings of the Prehistoric Society, from 1933 until 1970.

During the Second World War, Clark was drafted into the Royal Air Force Volunteer Reserve. He remained in Britain, working on aerial reconnaissance, and wrote further archaeological research articles in his spare time. After the war he returned to Cambridge University, where he was employed as a full-time lecturer. Over the course of 1949, 1950, and 1951, he excavated the important Mesolithic settlement site of Star Carr in North Yorkshire. Other excavations carried out under his directorship included that of an Iron Age settlement on Micklemoor Hill, Norfolk, and the Neolithic site of Hurst Fen, Suffolk. In 1951 he was made a Fellow of the British Academy, in 1952 appointed to Cambridge's Disney Chair, and in 1959 elected President of the Prehistoric Society. In later life he travelled the globe more extensively, often as a visiting professor. In these years, he also wrote more prolifically, although these books typically received a less enthusiastic reception than his earlier work.

Clark was not a popular figure among the British archaeological community, being regarded as a competitive and remote individual who craved recognition. He was nevertheless regarded as one of the most important prehistorians of his generation. He was particularly noted for his emphasis on exploring the economies and environmental conditions of prehistoric Europe. His career was recognised by a number of accolades, including the Dutch Erasmus Prize and a British knighthood, and he was the subject of a posthumous biography by Brian Fagan.

== Biography ==
=== Early life: 1907–27 ===
John Grahame Douglas Clark was born on 28 July 1907. He was the eldest son of Maude Ethel Grahame Clark (née Shaw) and Charles Douglas Clark, the latter being a stockbroker and a reserve officer in the British Army. The family were upper middle-class and moderately prosperous. They lived in the village of Shortlands, near to Bromley in West Kent. At the outbreak of the First World War, Charles Clark joined the West Kent Regiment and was sent to fight overseas. He survived the war, but during his return to Britain in 1919 succumbed to the influenza pandemic and died mid-journey. Grahame Clark grew up without a father, instead being raised by his mother and an uncle for whom he had great affection. According to the available evidence, Clark's childhood was a happy one. His family moved to Seaford, a coastal town on the edge of the Sussex Downs, with the young Clark developing a fascination with the prehistoric flint tools that he collected on the Downs.

In 1921 Clark began an education at Marlborough College in Wiltshire, where he joined the school's Natural History Society. Aside from his interest in prehistoric tools—which earned him the school nickname "Stones and Bones"—he was also fascinated by the butterflies and moths that could be found in Wiltshire. During his time at the college he visited the archaeological excavation of Windmill Hill run by Alexander Keiller, and became an early subscriber to the archaeological journal Antiquity. His interest in archaeology was encouraged by Antiquity's editor, O. G. S. Crawford, and he published articles on prehistoric tools in the Natural History Society's Reports. Having familiarised himself with much of the literature on prehistory, including V. Gordon Childe's influential 1925 book The Dawn of European Civilisation, in his final year at Marlborough Clark gave a talk on the subject of "Progress in Prehistoric Times". By the time that he left the school he was committed to the idea of becoming a professional archaeologist. In this period most prehistoric archaeologists were non-professional hobbyists, and of the few archaeological jobs available most were in museums.

=== University education: 1927–34 ===
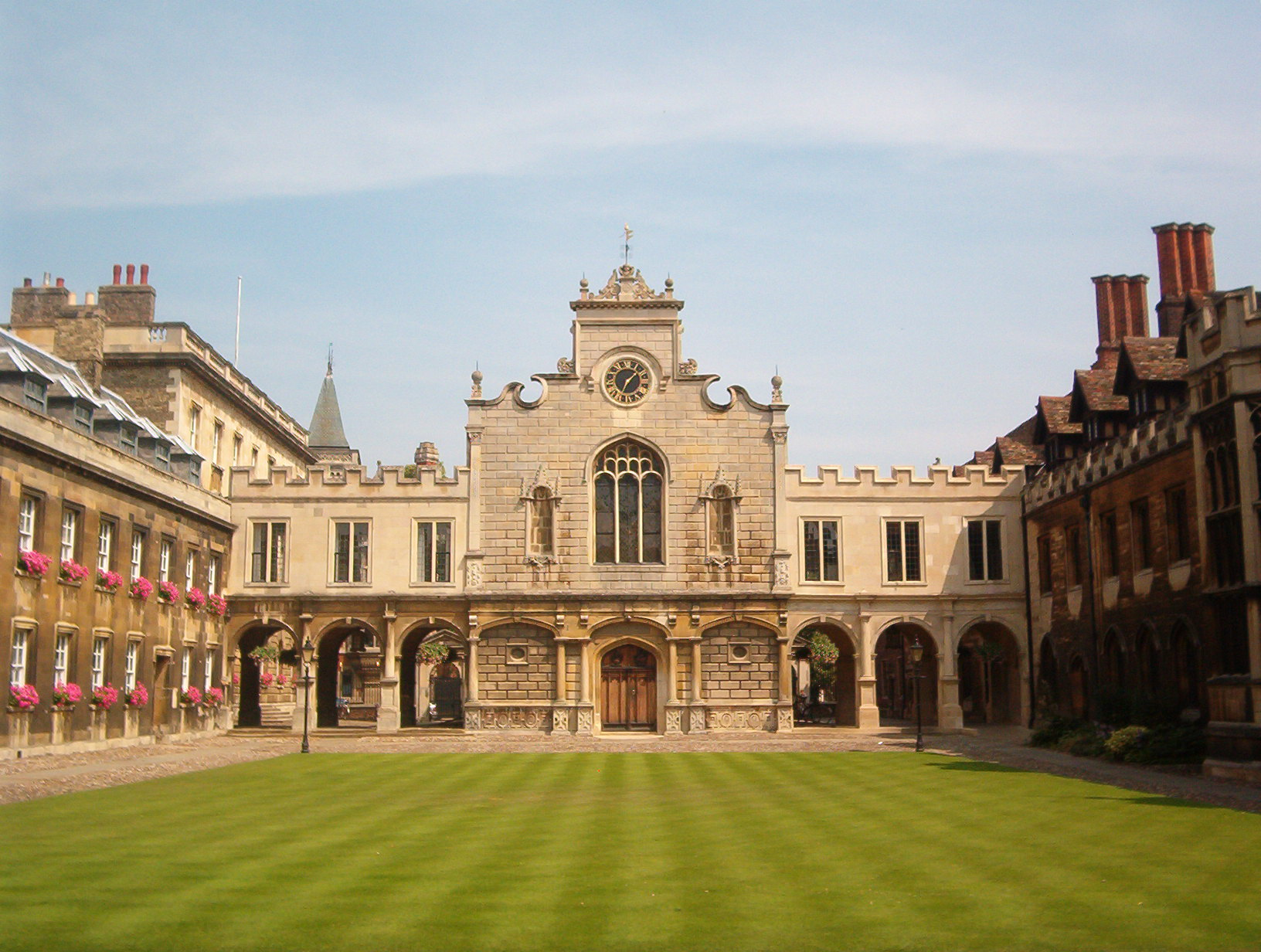
Clark gained his undergraduate and doctoral degrees from Peterhouse, Cambridge.

In 1920s, Britain there were few universities that taught courses in prehistory or archaeology. One was the University of Oxford, although Clark was unsuccessful in attaining a scholarship to attend St John's College, Oxford. Turning to the University of Cambridge, he applied to join Peterhouse and while they too turned him down for a scholarship, they admitted him as a "pensioner", or a student who pays for their own tuition. He began his degree in 1927, and during his first two years was enrolled on the history tripos. He attended lectures by economic historians like Michael Postan, which would influence his later archaeological approach to the economies of prehistoric societies. During these years he had continued his research into archaeology on an independent basis, producing articles on prehistoric stone tools that were published in the journals Sussex Archaeological Collections and the Proceedings of the Prehistoric Society of East Anglia.

In 1928, Clark began his studies in archaeology, which was then taught alongside physical anthropology and social anthropology within the university's anthropology department. The department was run by the Disney Professor Ellis Minns—whose ideas influenced Clark—while the archaeology curriculum was largely organised by Miles Burkitt, an unpaid lecturer of private means. Providing himself with a broad-based grounding in archaeology, Clark sat in on lectures given by archaeologists like Gertrude Caton Thompson, Dorothy Garrod, Leonard Woolley, and Childe. Although the Cambridge syllabus did not provide opportunities for excavation, Clark assisted the non-professional archaeologist Eliot Curwen during his excavations of the Whitehawk Neolithic causewayed camp near Brighton and then The Trundle, an Iron Age hillfort and Neolithic causewayed enclosure near Chichester. It was at the latter that he befriended two fellow excavators, Stuart Piggott and Charles Philips, who became lifelong friends. He also visited a number of Mortimer Wheeler's excavations, although never worked on them. Clark graduated in 1930 with a first-class honours degree.

Clark then registered as a doctoral student, being awarded a Hugo de Balsham studentship at Peterhouse from 1930 to 1932, and then a Bye Fellowship from 1932 to 1935. At Burkitt's suggestion, he devoted his thesis largely to the Mesolithic—or 'Middle Stone Age'—period of British prehistory. At the time little was known about Mesolithic Britain as few scholars had paid attention to it, and most of the archaeological evidence for it consisted of scattered flint tools. Burkitt served as his supervisor, although largely left Clark to his own devices. Clark initially familiarised himself with the evidence for Mesolithic society in continental Europe by travelling to Denmark and Sweden in 1929, where he had a chance meeting with Sophus Müller. On his return to Britain he began a systematic examination of Mesolithic stone tool collections that were held in both museums and private collections across the country, listing these many artefacts within a database. From this he was able to map the distribution of such Mesolithic tool assemblages across the island.

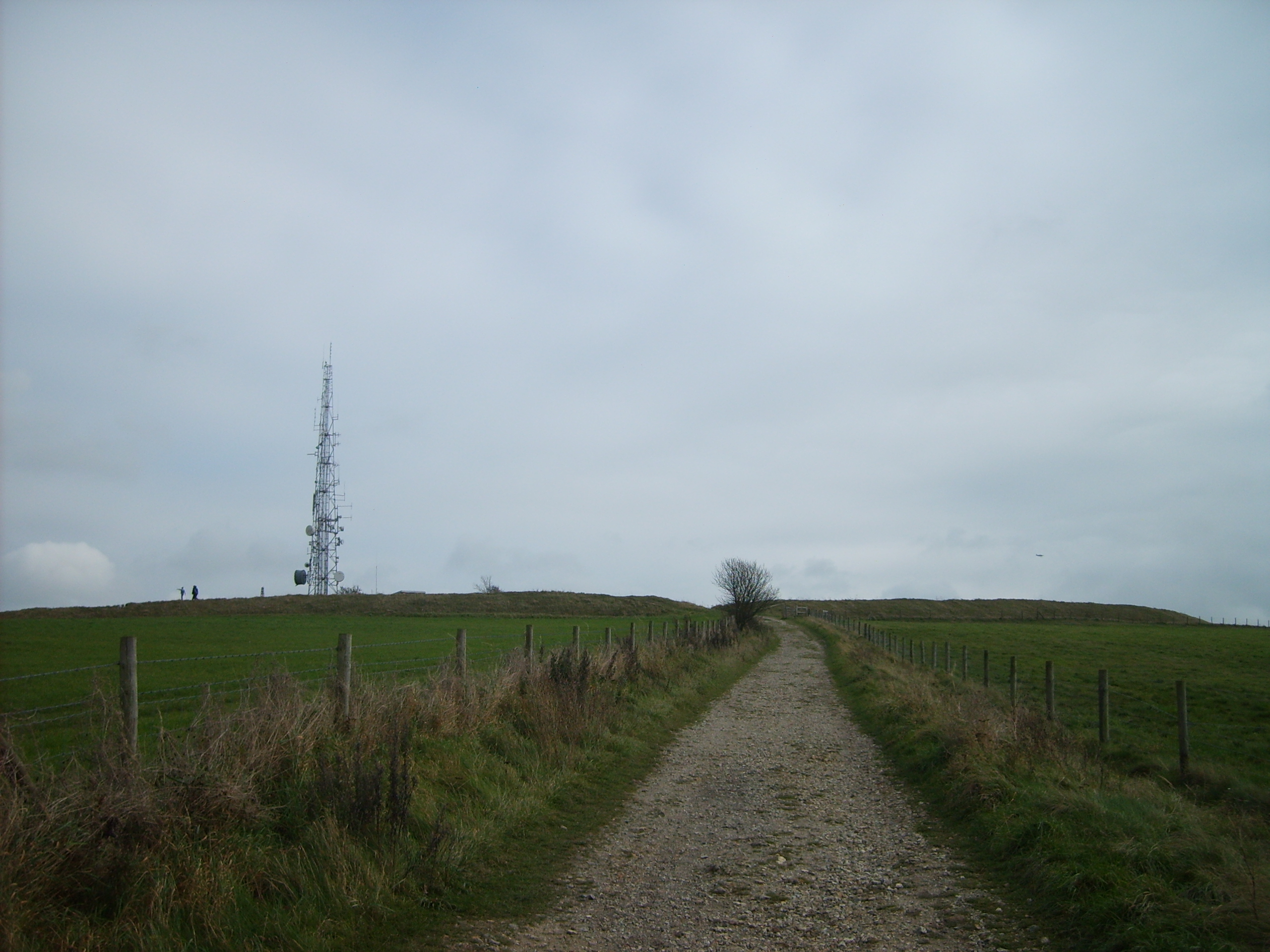
Clark learned to excavate while assisting the project at the Trundle, an Iron Age hillfort in Sussex.

On the basis of this research he wrote The Mesolithic Age in Britain, which was published to critical acclaim by Cambridge University Press in 1932. The book took a conservative approach to the subject by being heavily artefact-focused, although reflected Clark's growing interest in ecology and the role of Mesolithic society in adapting to climate change by discussing the technique of pollen analysis—which had recently been developed in Scandinavia—as a means of understanding ancient changes in the vegetation. Influenced by Childe, the book was rooted in the theoretical perspective of culture-historical archaeology, presenting different styles of Mesolithic tool as representations of different 'cultures', which in turn represented different peoples. The Mesolithic Age in Britain formed the core of Clark's completed thesis, which was titled "The Mesolithic, Neolithic, and Early Metal Age Industries in Britain" and submitted in January 1934. After passing his oral exam, which was conducted by Thomas Kendrick at the British Museum in London, Clark was awarded his PhD in 1934.

While conducting his research, he published a number of research articles in scholarly journals such as Antiquity. In 1932, he co-founded the Fenland Research Committee with the botanists Harry and Margaret Godwin; it represented a loose association of specialists in different academic fields who all had an interest in the East Anglian Fenlands. Clark served as the group's honorary secretary, and under him all of the Committee's research projects would be promptly written up and published. The group excavated at Plantation Farm near Shippea Hill, helping to establish a basic stratigraphic chronology of the Fenland's development. In 1934 they then carried out a second excavation at Peacock's Farm, which was very important for demonstrating the advantages of interdisciplinary research and for placing British prehistory within an environmental framework.

In February 1932, Clark was elected to the council of the Prehistoric Society of East Anglia, and in May 1933 became acting editor of the society's Proceedings at Childe's recommendation. In February 1934 he was made a permanent council member and honorary editor of the Proceedings. By 1934, both Clark and contemporaries like Piggott had become increasingly influential within the British archaeological community. Previously, in February 1933, Burkitt had ensured that Clark was elected a Fellow of the Society of Antiquaries. Clark himself was however unpopular in many archaeological circles, a result of what his later biographer Brian Fagan described as Clark's tendency to be "extremely critical, even cruel" toward others. During his doctoral studies, he entered a relationship with an archaeology student at Girton College, Cambridge named Gwladys Maud "Mollie" White. In June 1933 the couple assisted Philips' excavation of the long barrow atop Giant's Hill near Skendleby, Lincolnshire.

=== Early career: 1935–39 ===
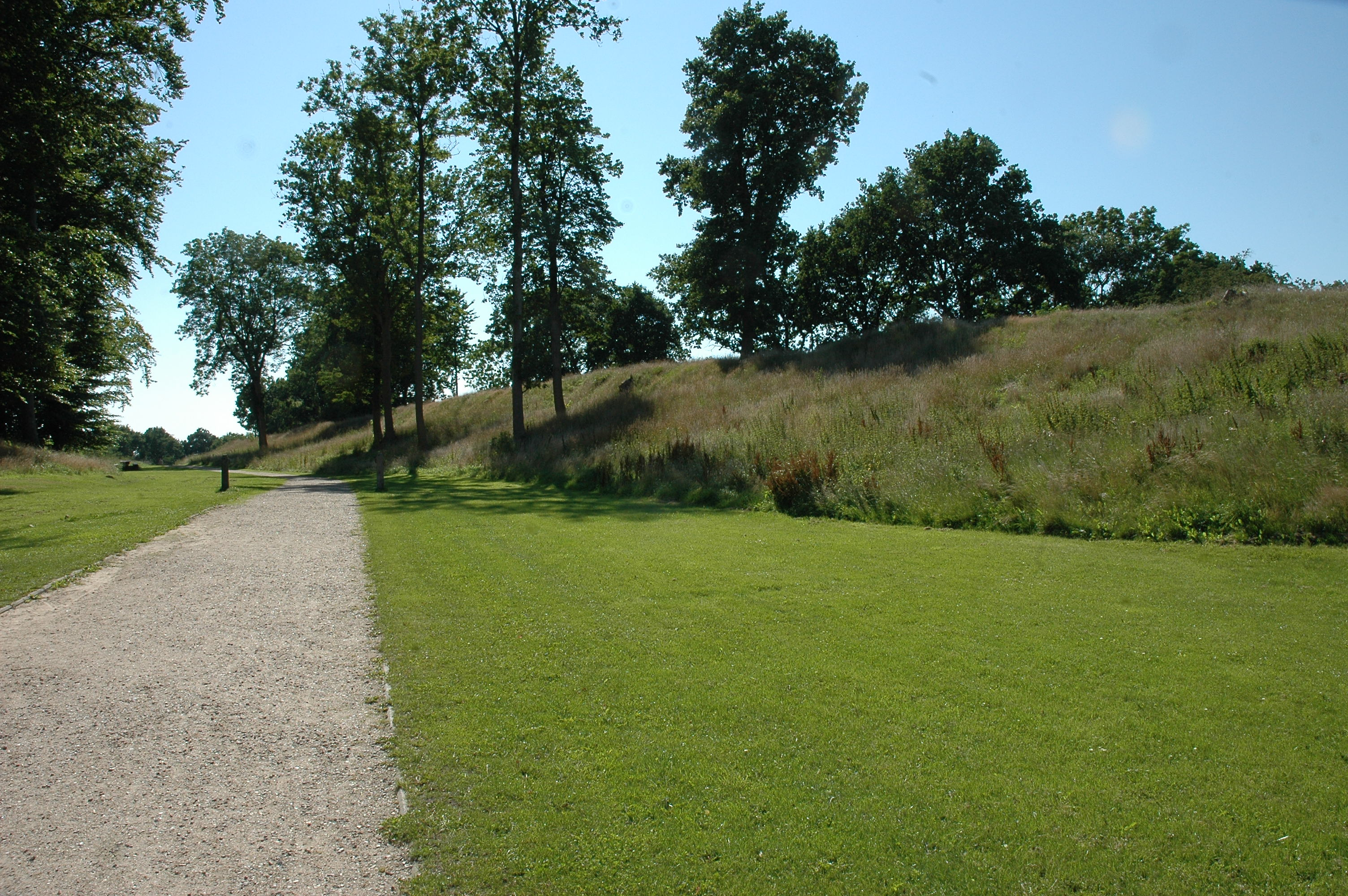
In 1936, Clark was guided around the Danebirke by German archaeologists

In July 1935, Cambridge University's Department of Anthropology and Archaeology employed Clark as an assistant lecturer to teach a course on "geochronology and climatic history", and the following year his position was upgraded to that of a faculty member. In this position he trained an influential coterie of undergraduates in archaeology between 1935 and 1939, among them Charles McBurney, Bernard Fagg, and J. Desmond Clark. In 1935, he helped to set up the Cambridge University Archaeology Field Unit and was appointed its honorary vice president. He arranged for undergraduate members of the Field Unit to assist him in his March 1935 excavations at Mildenhall Fen, where they discovered a wealth of Bronze Age material. Over the course of 1937 and 1938, he co-ran an excavation of the Mesolithic site at Farnham with the non-professional W. F. Rankine. The excavation only revealed some stone tools, producing no ecological data and very little evidence of any structures. Although Rankine argued that they should produce a lengthy report, Clark only wrote up the results for a 1939 article in the Proceedings of the Prehistoric Society.

In February 1935, Clark had suggested that the Prehistoric Society of East Anglia rename itself as the Prehistoric Society, thus stretching its remit far beyond East Anglia. A vote on the issue produced an overwhelming majority in support of the change. Membership of the group then grew rapidly; in 1935 it had 353 members, and this had increased to 668 in 1938. Under Clark's lead, the new Proceedings of the Prehistoric Society published articles by prominent archaeologists like Childe, Piggott, Philips, and Glyn Daniel, and emphasised interdisciplinary examinations that took into account the work of the natural sciences. Clark also encouraged archaeologists working on non-British prehistory to submit to the journal, and met with the prominent French archaeologist Henri Breuil on the latter's visit to Cambridge.

In the summer of 1936, Clark married Mollie in St Peter's Church, Chichester. They then embarked on a honeymoon in Norway and Sweden, looking at the region's prehistoric rock art, on the subject of which Clark then produced an illustrated article for Antiquity. Later that year, the couple and Philips embarked on a road trip across northern Europe, visiting archaeological sites like the Danevirke and the Nydam Boat. In Germany they spent time at the Schleswig Museum and met with Gustav Schwantes, who took them to visit Alfred Rust's excavation of a Mesolithic site at Meiendorf. Clark and Rust got on well and remained in contact for many years. Crossing to Denmark, the trio were involved in a car crash near to Randers, with the Clarks requiring hospitalisation for three weeks.

Mollie and Grahame were recruited by Charles Phillips to excavate the Sutton Hoo Mound 1 ship in 1939.

In 1936, Cambridge University Press published Clark's The Mesolithic Settlement of Northern Europe, in which he demonstrated his growing interest in ecological and environmental themes. The book established Clark as being at the forefront of Mesolithic archaeology, and was hailed as an important and trend-setting tome which would influence generations of Mesolithic archaeologists before eventually becoming outdated due to more detailed research.

Clarke's 1939 diagram from Archaeology and Society

In 1939 Methuen and Co published Clark's Archaeology and Society. This was a textbook that outlined how to understand past societies through archaeology, and expressed the view that archaeology could be a force for peace in the world by promoting notions of human unity. In the book he condemned Soviet archaeology, believing that the Soviet government had forced archaeologists to support their pre-conceived Marxist ideas about societal and economic development. He also condemned the use of archaeology in Nazi Germany and Fascist Italy, claiming that they used archaeology to promote a "diseased nationalism". On page 152 of Archaeology and Society Clark included a graph that represents the first use of systems theory in archaeology. Clark said "with this figure as a basis I could do anything". This concept was one of the primary building blocks of Processual Archaeology which became dominate in the 1960s and 1970s. Published to good reviews, the book was read widely and revised editions were published in 1947 and 1952. According to the historian of archaeology Pamela Jane Smith, it became "one of Clark's most widely read and respected publications."

=== Second World War: 1939–45 ===
Clark's archaeological career was put on hold during the Second World War. While awaiting enlistment into the British armed forces, Clark took lessons in Russian with Minns in order to enable him to read Soviet archaeological publications. He was then drafted into the Royal Air Force (RAF) Volunteer Reserve as a pilot officer, being posted to the central interpretative unit at RAF Medmenham. There, he served in the aerial photograph interpretation unit, where he worked alongside fellow archaeologists like Daniel, Garrod, Piggott, Philips, and McBurney. This grouping allowed for some continuity in the British archaeological community despite the widespread cessation of active research. During this period he lived with his wife and two children at a small, isolated house in Little Marlow, Buckinghamshire. In 1944 he was transferred to the Air Historical Branch based in Westminster, which allowed him and his family to relocate back to their Cambridge house in Barton Road. Clark used his daily commute from Cambridge into central London to edit articles submitted for the Proceedings. Although all meetings of the Prehistoric Society were cancelled for the duration of the war, Clark was able to keep the journal going despite paper rationing.

Clark read omnivorously and produced a steady stream of academic articles in this period. From 1942 to 1948, he published articles on such diverse subjects as water, bees, sheep, fishing, and whale hunting in prehistory. These publications reflected his interest in using recorded folk culture and historical evidence to inspire fresh interpretations of the archaeological material. In August 1943, Clark gave the opening address at the 'Future of Archaeology' conference at London's Institute of Archaeology. This address was then published in Antiquity. In it, Clark claimed that education in British schools was a "parody of knowledge" and that rather than emphasising competitiveness and preparing pupils for future careers, education should focus on "human well-being" and helping students to gain an understanding of both themselves and of humanity. He claimed that the teaching of prehistory—a subject he thought to be the inheritance of all humanity—would provide a good basis for a pupil's education. At the conference, he had been among those arguing that after the war the field of archaeology should not be allowed to come under increasing state control, fearing that doing so might result in British archaeology taking on increasingly nationalistic characteristics, as it had in Nazi Germany.

=== Post-war period: 1946–51 ===
Clark was demobilised in 1946. He returned to Cambridge University where he was appointed full lecturer in archaeology, with the department now under the leadership of Garrod. During the war he had written From Savagery to Civilisation, and it was published by Cobbett Press in 1946. The book utilised the anthropologist Edward Burnett Tylor's division of society into the categories of savagery, barbarism, and civilisation, although added the innovation of dividing savagery into higher and lower forms. Fagan later noted that in adopting Tylor's tripartite division, the book was "old-fashioned even for the 1940s". During the summer break of 1947, Clark led a team of undergraduates in the excavation of Bullock's Haste along the Car Dyke near Cottenham, revealing evidence of early Romano-British activity. In 1947 and in 1948, he was awarded a Leverhulme Fellowship which allowed him to travel across much of Northern and Central Europe. He looked at the technologies and techniques of rural and fishing communities in much of Scandinavia, displaying his interest in the relationship between folk culture and ecology. He expanded the length of the Proceedings in the years following the war, now aided by Piggott and Kenneth Oakley as his editorial assistants.

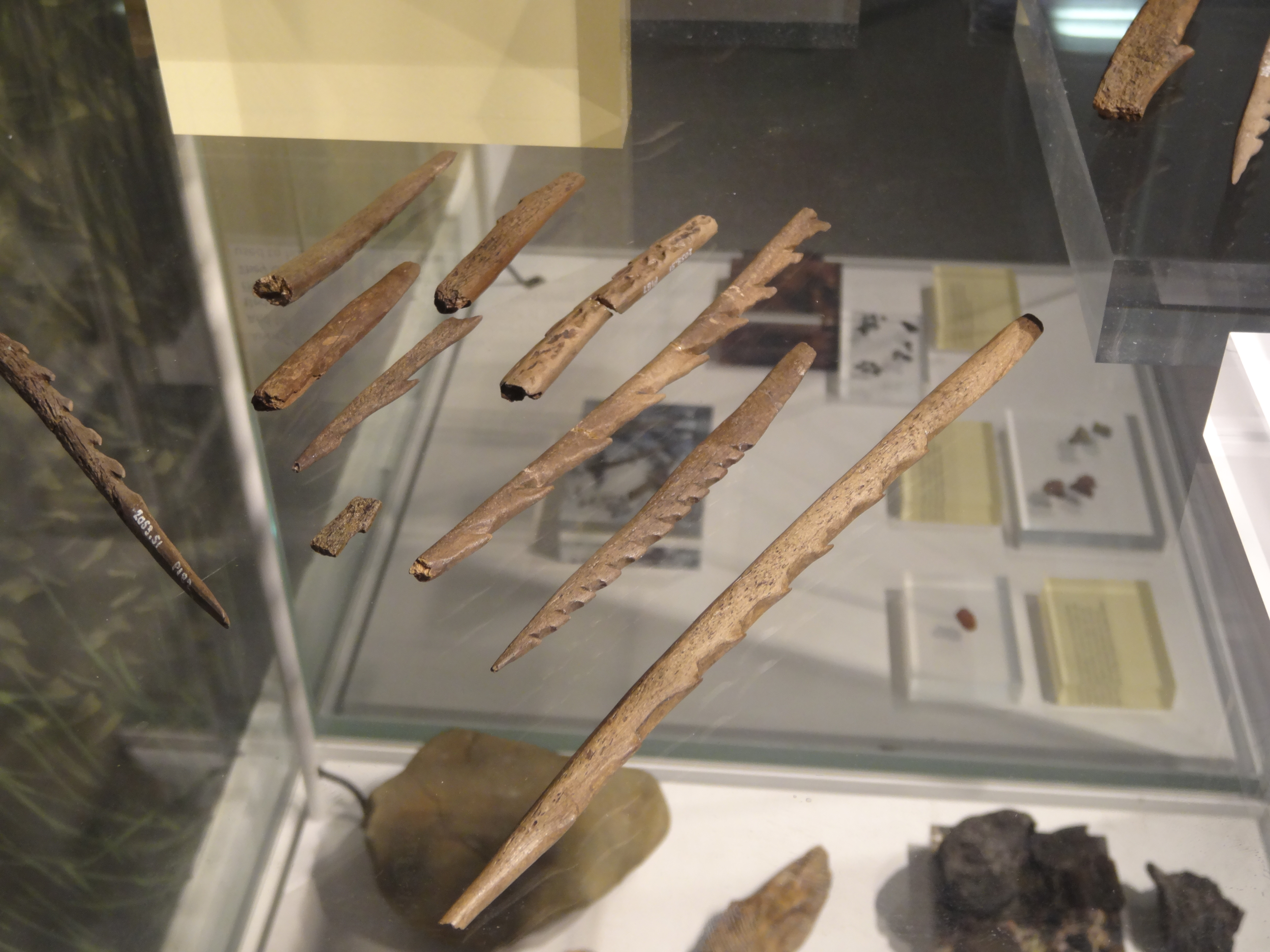
Mesolithic barbed spear points found at Star Carr

In 1946, Childe resigned as the Abercromby Professor of Archaeology at the University of Edinburgh. Clark applied to succeed him, although the position was instead given to Piggott. Piggott then invited Clark to give the Munro Lectures at Edinburgh in 1949. In 1950, he was elected to a fellowship at Peterhouse, a position that he held for the next 45 years. At the college he befriended his colleague Michael Postan, an economic historian whose research into Medieval farming techniques inspired Clark to reassess Neolithic farming. In 1951, he contributed a chapter on the use of folklore in interpreting prehistory for a festschrift devoted to Childe. Fagan later described this chapter as one of Clark's most important papers. Using his Munro Lectures as a basis, Clark also wrote a book, Prehistoric Europe: the Economic Basis, which reflected his interest in ecology and the impact that it had on the economics of human society. The book received mixed reviews, although would be described by Fagan as "arguably the most influential of all Clark's books". It sold widely and was translated into several languages.

Clark had been very impressed with Gerhard Bersu's excavation of the Iron Age settlement of Little Woodbury in Wiltshire in 1938 and 1939. After the war, he decided to excavate an Iron Age settlement nearer to Cambridge using the same techniques as Bersu had used. An amateur archaeologist had found early Iron Age pottery on Micklemoor Hill near West Harling in Norfolk, and Clark began an excavation of the site in 1948. However, before Clark could finish the excavation, he was distracted by a new project.

In 1948, Clark was informed about a Mesolithic flint scatter that had been found in peaty deposits at Seamer Carr in North Yorkshire by an amateur archaeologist, John Moore. Clark visited this site, known as Star Carr, and realised that it may provide further evidence of a Mesolithic settlement. He oversaw three seasons of excavation at the site, in the summers of 1949, 1950, and 1951. The project was carried out on a shoestring budget under the auspices of Cambridge University and the Prehistoric Society. The project was consciously multidisciplinary, involving botanists from the beginning. Fagan noted that the excavation methods were "adequate, although certainly not up to Mortimer Wheeler standards". He published his results promptly, bringing out preliminary reports in the 1949 and 1950 editions of the Proceedings. The final monograph was completed in December 1952 and published by Cambridge University Press in 1954. According to Fagan, it was "one of the classic archaeological monographs of the twentieth century". It was published to good reviews, and helped to establish Clark's reputation among the archaeological community in the United States. A number of American excavations—such as that at Ozette indigenous village in Washington—were influenced by its multidisciplinary approach.

=== Disney Chair: 1952–72 ===
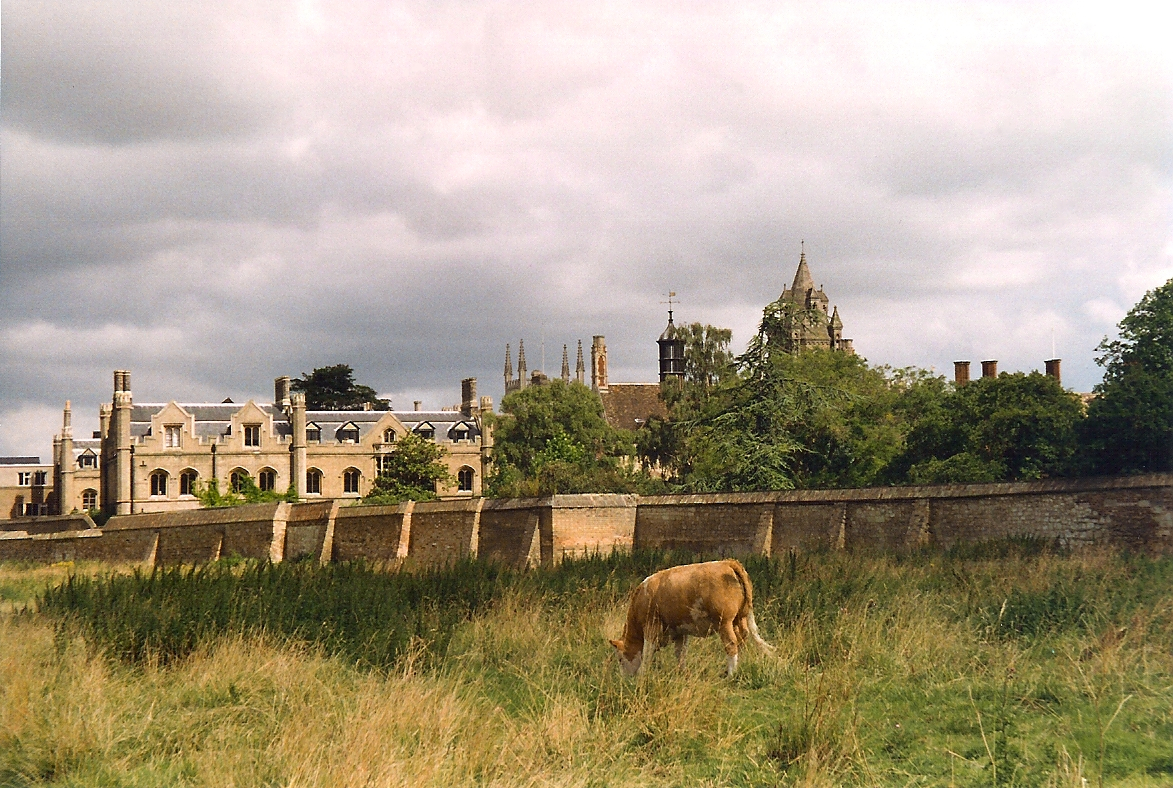
Peterhouse

In 1952, Garrod took an early retirement and Clark was selected as her replacement for the Disney Chair. To mark this status, Cambridge University awarded him an Sc.D degree on the basis of his published work. In this position he avoided formal meetings and made decisions by himself. He failed to obtain many resources for the department from the university administration, with the department therefore remaining small under his tenure. He did however acquire funds to hire a research assistant, the first being Eric Higgs. As chair, he encouraged the staff in his department to prioritise their research over teaching, and to prioritise the teaching of graduates over undergraduates. In this position he had little personal contact with the department's students, and encouraged them to go abroad after their education, believing that the best opportunities for archaeological research lay outside Britain. He got on with some of his staff, such as John Coles and McBurney, although not with others, such as Glyn Daniel.

Over the coming years he would also sit on a range of committees, including the Ancient Monuments Board, Royal Commission on the Historical Monuments of England, the management committee of the Institute of Archaeology, as well as the Prehistoric Society, of whose journal he remained editor. In 1951, he had been elected a Fellow of the British Academy, and in 1953 he gave the Academy's Reckitt Archaeological Lecture, which he devoted to a discussion of prehistoric economies.

With his project at Star Carr completed, Clark returned his attention to the excavation of the Iron Age settlement at Micklemoor Hill. He oversaw two further seasons of excavation in 1952 and 1953, which was mostly overseen by Clare Fell, the assistant curator at the Museum of Archaeology. In 1954, Clark was made aware of Neolithic pottery and worked flints that had been discovered through an excavation at Hurst Fen near Mildenhall in Suffolk. Believing this to be likely evidence of a Neolithic settlement, he oversaw a project of excavation at the site in 1957 and 1958, although left most of the running of the excavation to Higgs. Clark was disappointed that he excavation revealed a number of scatters post-holes and pits but no structures. The site had nevertheless yielded important typological information about Neolithic pottery and provided greater knowledge about the Neolithic period in eastern England. It would prove to be Clark's final major excavation.

Prehistoric Europe brought Clark wider visibility and resulted in his first opportunity to visit the United States. In 1952 he was asked to attend the inaugural meeting of the Wenner Gren Foundation for Anthropology in New York City. At the event Clark met the American archaeologist Gordon Willey, who became his good friend. In 1957, he returned to the U.S. to teach for a semester as the Grant McCurdy Lecturer at Harvard University. In 1958, Clark published his last piece of original research on the Mesolithic, an article on trapez-shaped microliths for the Proceedings. That year he also spent time in France's Dordogne region, visiting Lascaux cave and Hallam L. Movius's excavation of Abri Pataud. In 1959, Clark was elected President of the Prehistoric Society. In his presidential address he called for a less Eurocentric and more global focus on research into prehistory. To this end he produced a one-volume history of global prehistory, resulting in World Prehistory: An Outline, which was published by Cambridge University Press in 1961. Despite its title, over half of the book was devoted to the prehistory of Western and Central Europe, reflecting how little was known about much of the world's distant past at the time. The book proved an immediate success and brought Clark far greater visibility and opportunities.

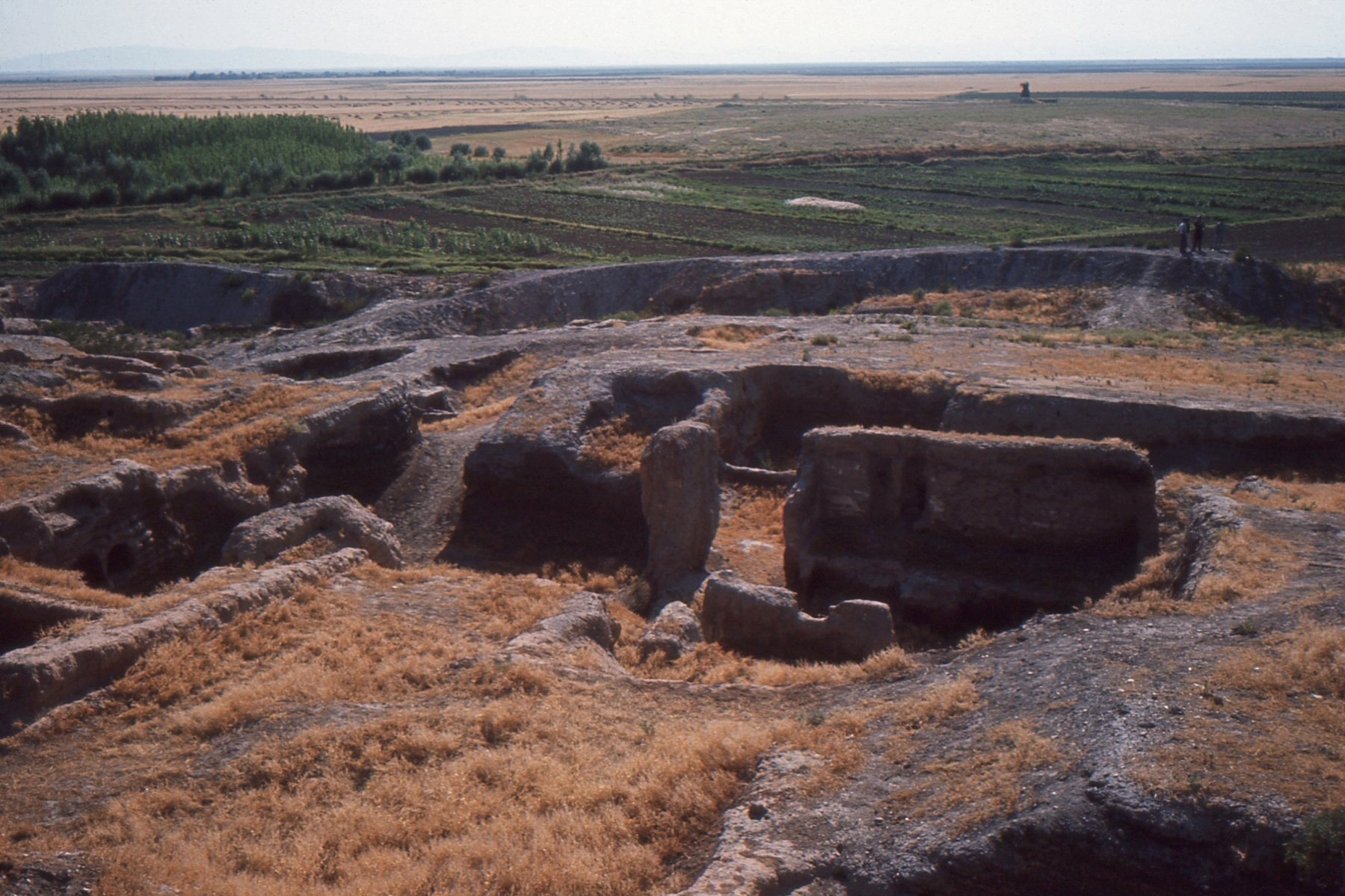
During the 1960s, Clark spent increasing time visiting archaeological sites across the world, including Çatalhöyük in Turkey

In 1960, Clark returned to Peacock Farm to oversee a small excavation designed to recover material that could be subjected to the newly developed process of radiocarbon dating. He also grew increasingly interested in Greek prehistory, and gained a permit to excavate the Neolithic Nea Nikomedia mound near Veroia in eastern Macedonia. He did not personally lead the excavation, which took place in 1961, instead leaving that to his student Robert Rodden, who was assisted by fellow students like David L. Clarke, Charles Higham, and Colin Renfrew. After his visited the excavation, Clark proceeded to Turkey to visit James Mellaart excavation of the Neolithic site at Çatalhöyük. Clark then furthered his interest in south-eastern Europe by writing an article for the Proceedings which synthesised newly discovered radiocarbon dates to argue that farming originally spread across Europe from Greece and the Western Balkans.

In early 1964, Clark made his first visit to the Antipodes as he spent time as the William Evans Professor at Otago University in New Zealand, using the opportunity to learn more about Maori prehistory. In May of that year he used the Commonwealth Visiting Scholars' appointment to fund a period in Australia, where he spent time at the University of Sydney, Queensland Museum, and the Australian Museum. He also visited Vincent Megaw's excavation of the Curracurrang rock shelter and was taken by Norman Tindale to witness a living hunter-gatherer society at the Papunya indigenous community. In November 1965, he undertook a lecture tour of the U.S., giving talks at Pennsylvania State University, Temple University, the University of Michigan, the University of Chicago, the University of Colorado, and Colorado Women's College. That year Hutchinson published a book that Clark had co-written with Piggott, Prehistoric Societies, and in 1967 Thames and Hudson published Clark's coffee table book, The Stone Age Hunters. In 1968, he published a revised second edition of World Prehistory, although it attracted criticism from archaeologists studying Africa for making significant errors about that continent. In 1968, he travelled via Moscow to Japan in order to attend the International Conference of Anthropological and Ethnological Sciences, using the trip to spend time in Taiwan, the Philippines, and New Zealand. In 1969, he was then appointed visiting Hitchcock Professor at the University of California-Berkeley; his lectures there were published as Aspects of Prehistory by the University of California Press in 1970. He published a classification system of five "lithic modes" or types of stone tools in 1969, which is still in use today.

In 1970, Clark retired as editor of the Proceedings. In 1972, Clark spent time at Uppsala University as a visiting professor. That same year, Clark returned to the subject of Star Carr to publish a book for undergraduate students, Star Carr: A Case Study in Bioarchaeology. Towards the end of his career, Clark was given a range of awards in recognition of his research output: the Smithsonian Institution's Hodgkins Medal in 1967, the Wenner-Gren Foundation's Viking Fund Medal in 1971, Commander of the Order of the British Empire in 1971, the University of Pennsylvania's Lucy Wharton old Medal in 1974, the Society of Antiquaries' Gold Medal in 1978, and the Asiatic Society's Chandra Medal in 1979. Two festschrift's were also produced in his honour: a 1971 volume of the Proceedings was devoted to him, while in 1976, Gale de Giberne Sieveking, Ian H. Longworth, and Kenneth E. Wilson produced the edited volume Problems in Economic and Social Archaeology, which again was dedicated to Clark.

=== Later life: 1973–95 ===
Clark retired as Disney Professor in 1974. From 1973 until 1980 he served as the Master of Peterhouse, in what became some of the happiest years of his life. In 1975, he revised may of his ideas on Mesolithic Northern Europe for The Earlier Stone Age Settlement of Scandinavia. The book was not well received, with many archaeologists working on Scandinavian material deeming it outdated. In 1976, he made a coast-to-coast trip across Canada, and that year chaired the first meeting of the Science-based Archaeological Committee, which had been established by the Science Research Council in order to distribute funds to archaeological projects. In 1977, he published a third edition of World Prehistory, now retitled World Prehistory in New Perspective. From 1974 to 1978, he chaired the British Academy's Section Ten, which was devoted to archaeology and anthropology. In 1978 he travelled to New Delhi to attend the Wheeler Memorial Lecture of the Archaeological Survey of India at the invitation of B. K. Thapar.

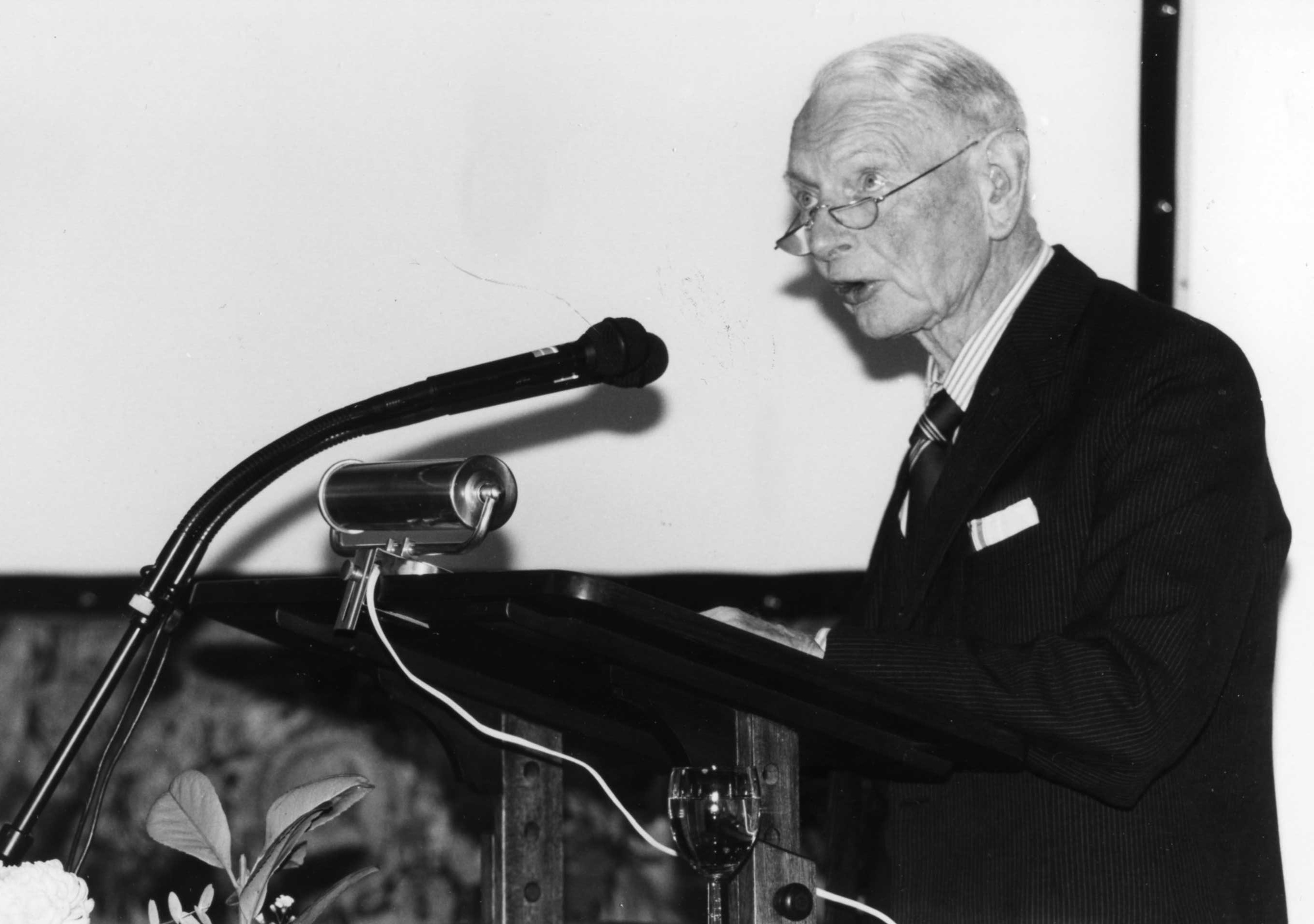
Clark giving his Erasmus Prize acceptance speech in 1990

In 1980, Clark's short book, Mesolithic Prelude was published, based on his 1979 Munro Lecture. In 1982, Methuen then published Clark's The Identity of Man as Seen by an Archaeologist, in which he argued that cultural diversity underlay the process of humanisation. The book received few reviews, including one produced by Edmund Leach for Nature which was highly critical, arguing that Clark's functionalist and culturally evolutionary approach was outdated. He then produced a sequel, Symbols of Excellence, which allowed him to discuss his interest in art; it was published by Cambridge University Press in 1986. In 1989, Clark's Prehistory at Cambridge and Beyond was published, a work that was part-biography and part-history of archaeology, discussing the broad diaspora of Cambridge-trained archaeologists. Clark's final book, Space, Time, and Man: A Prehistorian's View, was published by Cambridge University Press in 1992. The book dealt with concepts of time and place throughout the ages and received few reviews on publication. According to Fagan, Clark's later books were "based on the values of an earlier time and reflect his profound conservatism", perhaps explaining why they received so little attention.

In his final years, Clark continued to receive recognition for his achievements. The Netherlands Foundation awarded him the Erasmus Prize in 1990. He divided the £100,000 prize money between the British Academy and the Prehistoric Society, allowing both to establish their own prizes. In 1992, the British state then awarded him a knighthood. While on a cruise in the eastern Mediterranean with his wife, Clark suffered a serious stroke in June 1995, requiring a return home. There, he died in Cambridge on 12 September 1995. A memorial service was held at Little St Mary's, Cambridge. One of his fellow staff members at Cambridge, John Coles, was appointed literary executor of his books and papers.

== Archaeological approach ==
According to Fagan, Clark was "more concerned with what happened [in the past] rather than how or why." The archaeologist John Mulvaney stated that, in contrast to the tendency of Childe and other archaeologists to focus on artefact typologies, Clark's "vibrant world embraced landscape, economy and social themes, not simply labelled artefacts". This was reflected in the changing definitions of archaeology that Clark used; in 1927 he claimed that archaeology was "the study of past distribution of culture-traits in time and space, and of the factors governing their distribution", while in 1939 he referred to it as "the study of how men lived in the past".

Clark began as an archaeologist interested in the use, manufacture, and distribution of implements but quickly became an archaeologist interested in the activities that the use, manufacture, and distribution of implements imply.

— Pamela Jane Smith

Clark was fascinated by prehistoric subsistence and social patterns. His approach to prehistory was rooted in the notion that the human race was biologically united and that human diversity arose from responses to changing environments. Smith believed that as of 1939, Clark had become a functionalist. From 1972 onward, Clark became heavily involved in the use of newly developed scientific techniques for the analysis of archaeological material. Influenced by German and Scandinavian archaeological models, Clark drew on folklore and ethnography to gain a better understanding of prehistoric modes of subsistence. He nevertheless did not use such analogies uncritically, believing that they were mostly of use when there was a continuous historical link between older and more recent communities and where they both lived in very similar environmental conditions.

Clark encountered the development of processual archaeology during the mid-20th century, when his student David L. Clarke became one of its key proponents. The proponents of processualism, then referred to as the "New Archaeology", often rejected what they regarded as the old guard in the profession. Clark stayed out of the theoretical debates between the processualists and adherents of older schools of thought, although in a letter to Coles expressed "distress" at what he saw as students forcing archaeological data to fit their preconceived notions. He rejected the idea that archaeology was a pure science, claiming that this was misguided and "also pathetic".

== Personal life ==
[Clark] was fundamentally a simple and direct thinker, with a brilliant gift for getting at the nub of a problem and a breadth of vision that could be astounding. Grahame Clark was conservative, sometimes magisterial, even rude, but his archaeology was sometimes tinged with genius.

— Brian Fagan

Physically, Clark was tall and thin, and in his personal life he was intensely private. Fagan described him as "an imposing, remote man who hid his feelings", while presenting "an austere, sometimes forbidding exterior". Coles similarly regarded him as aloof figure, but nevertheless thought that he was "basically a sympathetic and kind man". Clark was awkward around his students, who were often a little afraid of him. His lecture style was regarded as dry and not entertaining. Clark's biographer noted that his teaching was "at best pedestrian", and that he had a "reputation for poorly prepared lectures", rendering him unpopular as a teacher. According to Coles, Clark's lectures "were generally considered to be rather poorly constructed, and he often wandered from the subject in hand". In several cases he was reported to have given the wrong lecture to a class.

According to Fagan, Clark had a "competitive personality" and "craved recognition and an international reputation". Although he had many acquaintances within the archaeological community, he had few friendships with other archaeologists; according to Fagan, he was "not necessarily universally beloved". He annoyed colleagues by quickly turning any conversations into a talk about his own research. Daniel for instance noted that there was "an alarming and chilling self-centredness [in Clark]. It was so difficult to conduct any reasonable conversation" with him. Mulvaney, who was one of his students, noted that in supervisory meetings, the "austere and busy" Clark "wasted time with derisory gossip concerning his peers, tainted with dogmatic political assertions". Mulvaney nevertheless felt that Clark's "personality blemishes were worth enduring. As years passed he became helpful and friendly."

Fagan noted that Clark was one of the four men who dominated British archaeology during the 1950s and early 1960s, along with the Edinburgh-based Piggott, the Cardiff-based Roger Atkinson, and the Oxford-based Christopher Hawkes. Clark's relationship with these colleagues was mixed; Piggott was a lifelong friend, although Hawkes became his "long-term intellectual adversary". The two publicly disagreed strongly on the place of migration and cultural diffusion in British prehistory; Hawkes believed that cultural development and change was brought about primarily by migration into Britain, whereas Clark argued in favour of indigenous cultural evolution as the best explanation for such changes.

Clark could be arrogant, was ruthless in his criticism of what he considered shoddy work and could be self-absorbed in his research and writing, to the point of rudeness. His was a remote personality... but underneath the austere exterior was the kindest of men, capable of deep love and caring.

— Brian Fagan

Throughout his life, Clark remained a practising Christian. Politically, he was deeply conservative, an ideological standpoint nurtured since his youth. In books like The Identity of Man, Clark promoted what he saw as the benefits of social hierarchy, viewing socio-economic inequalities as an impetus towards liberty and believing that unequal levels of consumption allowed for humanity's greatest artistic and cultural creations. In response to these claims, Leach described Clark's political beliefs as "lying well to the right" of British Prime Minister Margaret Thatcher. An elitist, Clark believed strongly in the importance of individual achievement and human progress, believing that humanity's future lay in the ability of people from different cultures and ideologies to co-operate in order to solve those problems that they had in common.

Clark was dedicated to his family. According to Coles, his wife Mollie "became an indispensable part of Clark's academic life as well as a source of immense happiness to him". After their wedding, the Clarks purchased a house in Barton Road, Cambridge. They lived away from this house during the first part of the Second World War, although they returned in 1944. Here, Clark took an interest in gardening and proudly displayed his garden to visitors. Clark had a love of dinghy sailing, and for many years had a houseboat at the coastal town of Aldeburgh. When the boat became too dilapidated he replaced it with a cottage in the town in 1957. Clark spent much of his leisure time visiting art galleries, and in later life he began collecting art, as well as Chinese porcelain and Asian jade.

== Reception and legacy ==
Grahame Clark is remembered for his pioneering work in prehistoric economies, in the ecological approach, in the study of organic artefacts, in his initiation of science-based archaeology, in his various excavations and investigative projects, and in his world view of prehistory.

— Arkadiusz Marciniak and John Coles

For Fagan, Clark was "one of the most important prehistorians of the twentieth century", an individual whose "intellectual influence on archaeology was enormous", producing a "legacy to prehistory [that] will endure for generations". The historian Adam Stout noted that Clark was "one of the century's most influential prehistorians". Coles similarly noted that he was "one of the founders of European and world-wide prehistoric studies, and there are many now who would assert his primacy in these fields over all other prehistorians of the 20th century".

Coles noted that among continental European scholars, Clark was "the most respected British prehistorian" of his generation. Clark's work was however little known in the United States, where it was eclipsed in the 1960s by the growth of processual archaeology. A less grandiose assessment was left by the archaeologist Pamela Jane Smith, who stated that Clark made "major contributions to the establishment of prehistory as an academic subject at Cambridge University".

The archaeologists Arkadiusz Marciniak and John Coles stated that Clark was one of the "eminent archaeologists" who helped to establish prehistoric archaeology as a "fully professional discipline" with explicitly outlined goals and methods and an institutional foundation. He was a pioneer in ecological, functionalist approaches to archaeology, as well as the first archaeologist to write a global prehistory of humankind.

In November 1997, a Grahame Clark Memorial Conference was held at the British Academy in London. It was at the conference that John Coles invited Fagan to write Clark's biography. In 2007, an academic symposium was held to mark the centenary of Clark's birth at the Archaeology Museum of Biskupin in Poland; it was co-organised by the museum with the Polish Academy of Sciences and the Committee of Pre- and Proto-historical Sciences. On the basis of the conference, in 2010, Marciniak and Coles published a co-edited volume titled Grahame Clark and His Legacy. They noted that up to that point there had been "little in-depth assessment" of Clark's influence in archaeology, in particular in contrast to the large number of Childe.

== Publications ==
- Clark, Grahame (1985). "The Prehistoric Society: From East Anglia to the World". Proceedings of the Prehistoric Society. 51. Cambridge: Cambridge University Press: 1–14. doi:10.1017/S0079497X0000699X. S2CID 131148360.
- Clark, J. Grahame D. (1936). The Mesolithic Settlement of Northern Europe. Cambridge: Cambridge University Press.
- Clark, J. Grahame D. (1977). World Prehistory: In New Perspective. Cambridge: Cambridge University Press. ISBN 978-0521291781
- Clark, J. Grahame D. (1954). Excavations At Star Carr: An Early Mesolithic Site at Seamer, near Scarborough, Yorkshire. CUP Archive.
- Clark, Grahame; Mellaart, James; Mallowan, M. E. L; Aldred, Cyril. (1961). The Dawn of Civilisation The First World Survey of Human Cultures in Early Times. London: Thames and Hudson.
- Clark, Grahame & Piggott, Stuart (1965). Prehistoric Societies. Hutchinson. (The History of Human Societies series)

Academic offices
Preceded by Dorothy Garrod	Disney Professor of Archaeology, Cambridge University; 1952–1974	Succeeded by Glyn Daniel
Preceded by John Charles Burkill	Master of Peterhouse, Cambridge; 1973–1980	Succeeded by Hugh Trevor-Roper
