= The Adventure of Archaeology =

1985 book by Brian M. Fagan

- Author: Brian M. Fagan
- Genre: Non-fiction
- Publisher: National Geographic
- Publication date: 1985
- ISBN: 978-0-87044-603-0

The Adventure of Archaeology (ISBN 978-0-87044-603-0) is a 1985 book written by Dr. Brian M. Fagan, published by the National Geographic press publishing company. The book tells about the development of the history of archeology. It contains stories of treasure hunters and tourists and the development of archeology into a scientific field.
