= Georg F.L. Sarauw =

Swedish botanist and archaeologist

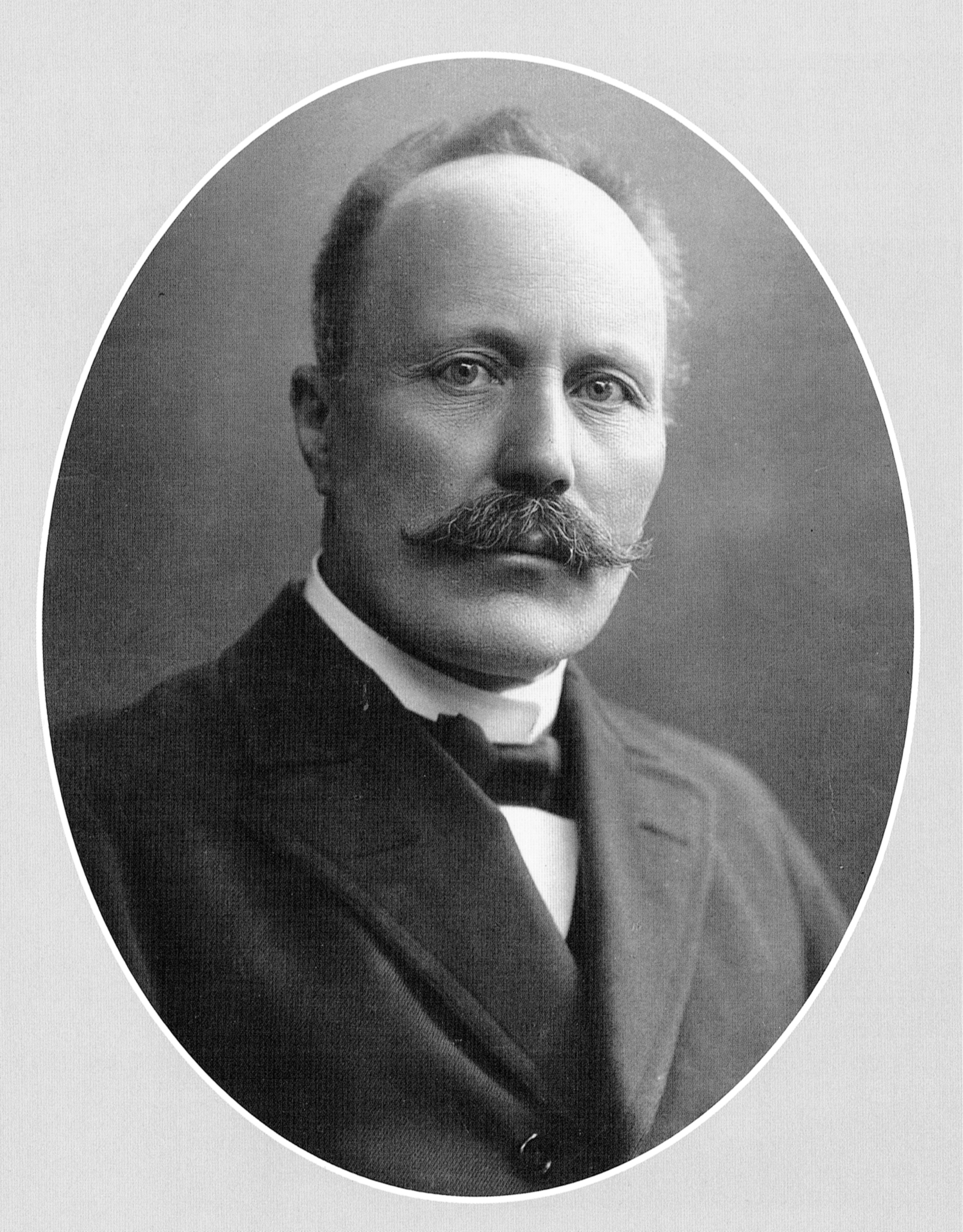
Georg Sarauw 1914

Georg Frederik Ludvig Sarauw (12 November 1862 – 17 February 1928) was a Danish-Swedish botanist and archaeologist. He discovered the Maglemosian culture and was among the first to study fossil pollen.

== Early life ==
He was born to Conrad August Nicolaus Sarauw (1816–86) and Betzy Wilhelmine Hansen (1834–1909). His father was forest manager at Pedersværft on Zealand. He became a student at Herlufsholm School in 1881. He studied natural history at the University of Copenhagen under professor Japetus Steenstrup and in 1882 took a degree in philosophy. After a study trip in 1883–84 to Munich, Rostock, Berlin and Paris, he became a forestry candidate in 1888. From 1894, he was associated with the department of prehistory at the National Museum of Denmark.

== Excavation of Maglemose ==
Sarauw led the excavation of an epipaleolithic settlement at Maglemose situated near Gørlev and Høng on Zealand, on western Zealand, southwest of lake Tissø. In 1900, the first settlement of the culture was excavated for which the Maglemosian culture was named. The thorough investigation moved the first prehistoric finds in Northern Europe 2,500 years back in time with respect to the Ertebølle culture, then thought to be the oldest stratum. The place was brought to the attention of the National Museum by local teacher M. J. Mathiassen in Mullerup. Sarauw's excavations were followed up in 1915 when new finds were unearthed. This time, schoolmaster Mathiassen's son, Therkel Mathiassen (1892–1967) then a student of archaeology and Lauge Koch (1892–1964) then student of geology and son of the parish vicar at Ubberup, were appointed leaders.

== Career ==
Sarauw then studied archaeology at Uppsala University and soon became a proliferous researcher and writer. This apparently led to conflict with Sophus Müller (1846–1934), director of the National Museum of Denmark. With help from Oscar Montelius (1843–1921), director of the Swedish National Heritage Board, Sarauw was employed at the newly founded archaeological division at the Museum of Gothenburg where from 1912 he remained for the rest of his career. From 1915 to 1923, he led an archaeological survey of early Geats settlement in the Göta älv area together with school teacher and local archaeologist Johan Alin (1879–1944).

== Selected bibliography ==
- Sarauw, G.F.L. (1893) Rodsymbiose og Mykorrhizer - særligt hos Skovtræerne [Root symbiosis and mycorrhizas - in particular with trees]. Botanisk Tidsskrift 18 (3–4): 127–259.
- Sarauw, G.F.L. (1898) Lyngheden i Oldtiden. Iagttagelser fra Gravhøje [Ancient heathlands - observations from burial mounds]. Aarbøger for nordisk Oldkyndighed og Historie, 1898: 69–124.
- Sarauw, G.F.L. (1903) En Stenaldersboplads i Maglemose ved Mullerup - sammenholdt med beslægtede fund [A Stone Age settlement in Maglemose near Mullerup - compared with related finds]. Résumé: Études sur le premier âge de la pierre du Nord de l'Europe. Aarbøger for nordisk Oldkyndighed og Historie 1903. A German translation appeared in Prähistorische Zeitschrift in 1911. Google Books
- Sarauw, G.F.L. & Johan Alin (1923) Götaälvsområdets fornminnen [Antiquities from the Göta Älv area]. Skrifter utgivna until Göteborgs stads trehundraårsjubileum genom jubileumsutställningens publikationskommitté, vol. 3. 370 pp.
