= Gwladys Maud White =

British archaeologist

Lady Gwladys Clark Gwladys Maud "Mollie" White
- Born: 1909 (age 116–117)
- Occupations: Archaeologist; Prehistorian
- Partner: Grahame Clark

Gwladys Maud "Mollie" White (born 1909) was a British prehistorian and archaeologist who conducted excavations and published on Neolithic and early medieval material culture.

== Archaeological work ==
White was educated at Girton College, Cambridge. She was elected to the Royal Archaeological Institute in 1932, nominated by Christopher Hawkes, with whom White would write on prehistoric artefacts from Selsey Bill in West Sussex. In 1933, White excavated at Giant's Hill in Lincolnshire under Charles Phillips, and was recruited again by Phillips as part of the Sutton Hoo 'Mound 1' excavation team.

== Personal life ==
White married the British archaeologist Grahame Clark in 1936, having met at the University Museum of Archaeology and Ethnology in Cambridge, as it was then known. Clark's obituary notes that White "gave up her job at the Royal Commission on the Ancient and Historical Monuments of Wales, and became an indispensable part of Clark’s academic life". White and Clark joined several excavations together, including Sutton Hoo and Giant's Hill.

In 1996, White donated a sculpture of Clark to the National Portrait Gallery, and 42 objects, mostly Chinese ceramics, were also given by White to the British Museum.

== Selected publications ==
- White, G. M. (1932). Neolithic Pottery from Selsey Bill. Sussex Notes Queries 4. Vol 4, p. 217.
- White, G. M. (1934). A Settlement of the South Saxons. The Antiquaries Journal 14. Vol 14, pp. 393–400.
- White, G. M. (1934). Prehistoric Remains from Selsey Bill. The Antiquaries Journal 14. Vol 14, pp. 40–52.
- White, G. M. (1935). A New Roman Inscription from Chichester. The Antiquaries Journal 15(4):461-464. doi:10.1017/S0003581500041421
- White, G. M. (1936). The Chichester Amphitheatre: Preliminary Excavations. The Antiquaries Journal. Vol 16, pp. 149–159.
