= Brian M. Fagan =

British scholar of archaeology (1936–2025)

- Born: Brian Murray Fagan; 1 August 1936; Birmingham
- Died: 1 July 2025 (aged 88)

Academic background
- Education: Rugby School; Pembroke College, Cambridge

Academic work
- Discipline: Archaeology
- Sub-discipline: Prehistory; history of archaeology
- Institutions: Livingstone Museum; University of Illinois Urbana-Champaign; University of California, Santa Barbara
- Website: brianfagan.com

Brian Murray Fagan (1 August 1936 – 1 July 2025) was a British author of popular archaeology books and a professor emeritus of anthropology at the University of California, Santa Barbara.

== Background ==
Fagan was born on 1 August 1936 in Birmingham, and he attended Rugby School. He went on to Pembroke College, Cambridge, where he studied archaeology and anthropology (BA 1959, MA 1962, PhD 1965). His doctoral thesis was titled "Some Iron Age cultures of the Southern Province, Northern Rhodesia, with special reference to the Kalomo Culture". He spent six years as keeper of prehistory at the Livingstone Museum in Zambia, Central Africa, and moved to the USA in 1966.

=== Academic career ===
Fagan was visiting associate professor of anthropology at the University of Illinois Urbana-Champaign, in 1966/67, and was appointed Professor of Anthropology at the University of California, Santa Barbara, in 1967.

Fagan was an archaeological generalist, with expertise in the broad issues of human prehistory. He was the author or editor of 46 books, including seven undergraduate college texts. Fagan contributed over 100 specialist papers to many national and international journals. He was a contributing editor to Archaeology Worldwide, American Archaeology and Discover Archaeology magazines, and formerly wrote a regular column for Archaeology Magazine. He was on the editorial boards of six academic and general periodicals, and contributed to Scientific American and Gentleman's Quarterly.

Fagan chose to teach introductory archaeology to large undergraduate classes at Santa Barbara. Avoiding traditional lecture formats, he experimented with technology from the 1970s to provide basic information, leaving his class periods for wide-ranging discussions of interest to students.

In conjunction with this interest in college teaching, Fagan began writing a series of archaeology textbooks beginning in 1972 that are still in print. These include In the Beginning (13th edition, 2013, with Nadia Durrani), People of the Earth (15th edition, 2018, with Nadia Durrani), Ancient North America (5th edition, 2019), Ancient Lives (7th edition, 2020, with Nadia Durrani), World Prehistory (9th edition, 2016, with Nadia Durrani), Ancient Civilizations (4th edition, 2016, with Chris Scarre), and Archaeology: A Brief Introduction (12th edition, 2016, with Nadia Durrani). These are designed for beginners. His approach melds traditional cultural history with more recent approaches, with an emphasis on writing historical narrative using archaeological data and sources from other disciplines.

Fagan was an archaeological consultant for organisations including National Geographic Society, Time-Life, Encyclopædia Britannica, and Microsoft Encarta. He lectured about archaeology and other subjects at venues including the Cleveland Museum of Natural History, the National Geographic Society, the San Francisco City Lecture Program, the Smithsonian Institution, and the Getty Conservation Institute.

In addition to experience with the development of public television programs, Fagan was the developer/writer of Patterns of the Past, an NPR series in 1984–86. He worked as a consultant for the BBC, RKO, and many Hollywood production companies on documentaries. In 1995, he was senior series consultant for Time-Life Television's Lost Civilizations series. Fagan was awarded the 1996 Society of Professional Archaeologists' Distinguished Service Award for his "untiring efforts to bring archaeology in front of the public." He also received a Presidential Citation Award from the Society for American Archaeology in 1996 for his work in textbook, general writing and media activities. He received the society's first Public Education Award in 1997.

Fagan wrote critiques of contemporary archaeology and advocated non-traditional approaches, as well as writing extensively on the role of archaeology in contemporary society. His approach was a melding of different theoretical approaches, which focuses on the broad issues of human prehistory and the past. He was an advocate of multidisciplinary approaches to such issues as climate change in the past.

=== Personal life and death ===
An avid sailor from childhood, Fagan wrote sailing guides to many locations on the Pacific coast of the United States and published them under his own imprint. He was married twice, first to Judith Fontana and then to Lesley Newhart. He retired from UC Santa Barbara, where he lived in the Santa Barbara area with his wife, one of his two daughters, and numerous cats and rabbits. Fagan died on 1 July 2025, at the age of 88.

== Bibliography ==
- Southern Africa during the Iron Age. London: Thames and Hudson, 1965.
- The Rape of the Nile: Tomb Robbers, Tourists, and Archaeologists in Egypt. New York: Charles Scribner's Sons, 1975 (hardcover, ISBN 0-684-14235-X); Boulder, CO: Westview Press, 2004 (revised and updated ed., paperback, ISBN 0-8133-4061-6).
- Quest for the Past: Great Discoveries in Archaeology. Boston: Addison Wesley, 1978 (paperback, ISBN 0-201-03111-6). (Second Edition published Long Grove, IL: Waveland Press, 1994)
- The Aztecs. W. H. Freeman and Company, 1984 (paperback, ISBN 0-7167-1585-6).
- Clash of Cultures. New York: W.H. Freeman & Company, 1984 (paperback, ISBN 0-7167-1622-4); Lanham, MD: AltaMira Press, 1997 (hardcover, ISBN 0-7619-9146-8; paperback, ISBN 0-7619-9145-X).
- The Adventure of Archaeology. Seattle, WA: University of Washington Press, 1985 (hardcover, ISBN 0-87044-603-7)
- The Great Journey: The Peopling of Ancient America. London: Thames & Hudson, 1987 (hardcover, ISBN 0-500-05045-7); 1989 (paperback, ISBN 0-500-27515-7); Gainesville, FL: University Press of Florida, 2004 (updated ed., paperback, ISBN 0-8130-2756-X).
- Cruising Guide to California Channel Islands, Western Marine Enterprises, 1989 (paperback, ISBN 978-0930030322).
- Journey from Eden: The Peopling of Our World. London: Thames & Hudson, 1991 (hardcover, ISBN 0-500-05057-0).
- Ancient North America: The Archeology of a Continent. London: Thames & Hudson, 1991 (softcover, ISBN 0-500-27606-4).
- Kingdoms of Gold, Kingdoms of Jade: The Americas Before Columbus. London: Thames & Hudson, 1991 (hardcover, ISBN 0-500-05062-7).
- Snapshots of the Past. Lanham, MD: AltaMira Press, 1995 (hardcover, ISBN 0-7619-9109-3; paperback, ISBN 0-7619-9108-5).
- Time Detectives: How Scientists Use Technology to Recapture the Past. New York: Simon & Schuster, 1995 (hardcover, ISBN 0-671-79385-3; paperback, ISBN 0-684-81828-0).
- (editor) The Oxford Companion to Archaeology. New York: Oxford University Press (USA), 1996 (hardcover, ISBN 0-19-507618-4).
- (editor) Eyewitness to Discovery: First-Person Accounts of More Than Fifty of the World's Greatest Archaeological Discoveries. New York: Oxford University Press (USA), 1997 (hardcover, ISBN 0-19-508141-2); 1999 (paperback, ISBN 0-19-512651-3).
- Floods, Famines, and Emperors: El Niño and the Fate of Civilizations. New York: Basic Books, 1999 (hardcover, ISBN 0-465-01120-9); 2000 (paperback, ISBN 0-465-01121-7); London: Pimlico, 2001 (new ed., paperback, ISBN 0-7126-6478-5)
- (editor) The Seventy Great Mysteries of the Ancient World: Unlocking the Secrets of Past Civilizations. London: Thames & Hudson, 2001 (paperback, ISBN 0-500-51050-4).
- The Cruising Guide to Central and Southern California: Golden Gate to Ensenada, Mexico, Including the Offshore Islands International Marine/Ragged Mountain Press, 2001 (paperback, ISBN 978-0071374644).
- The Little Ice Age: How Climate Made History, 1300–1850. New York: Basic Books, 2000 (hardcover, ISBN 0-465-02271-5); 2001 (paperback, ISBN 0-465-02272-3).
- Stonehenge. New York: Oxford University Press (USA), 2002 (ISBN 0-19-514314-0).
- Archaeologists: Explorers of the Human Past. New York: Oxford University Press (USA), 2003 (hardcover, ISBN 0-19-511946-0).
- Before California: An Archaeologist Looks at Our Earliest Inhabitants. Lanham, MD: Rowman & Littlefield, 2003 (paperback, ISBN 0-7425-2794-8); AltaMira Press, 2004 (new ed., paperback, ISBN 0-7591-0374-7).
- Grahame Clark: An Intellectual Biography of an Archaeologist. Boulder, CO: Westview Press, 2001 (hardcover, ISBN 0-8133-3602-3); 2003 (paperback, ISBN 0-8133-4113-2).
- Human Prehistory and the First Civilizations (2003) The Great Courses.
- The Long Summer: How Climate Changed Civilization. New York: Basic Books, 2003 (hardcover, ISBN 0-465-02281-2); 2004 (paperback, ISBN 0-465-02282-0).
- A Brief History of Archaeology: Classical Times to the Twenty-First Century. Upper Saddle River, NJ: Prentice Hall, 2004 (paperback, ISBN 0-13-177698-3).
- (editor) The Seventy Great Inventions of the Ancient World. London: Thames & Hudson, 2004 (hardcover, ISBN 0-500-05130-5).
- Chaco Canyon: Archaeologists Explore the Lives of an Ancient Society. New York: Oxford University Press (USA), 2005 (hardcover, ISBN 0-19-517043-1).
- Writing Archaeology: Telling Stories About the Past. Walnut Creek, CA: Left Coast Press, 2005 (hardcover, ISBN 1-59874-004-0; paperback ISBN 1-59874-005-9).
- From Stonehenge to Samarkand: An Anthology of Archaeological Travel Writing. New York: Oxford University Press (USA), 2006 (hardcover, ISBN 0-19-516091-6).
- Fish on Friday: Feasting, Fasting, And Discovery of the New World. New York: Basic Books, 2007 (hardcover, ISBN 0-465-02284-7; paperback, ISBN 0-465-02285-5).
- The Great Warming: Climate Change and the Rise and Fall of Civilizations. New York: Bloomsbury Press, 2008 (hardcover, ISBN 978-1-59691-392-9).
- Cro-Magnon: How the Ice Age Gave Birth to the First Modern Humans. New York: Bloomsbury Press, 2010 (hardcover, ISBN 978-1-59691-582-4).
- Elixir: A Human History of Water. New York: Bloomsbury Press, 2011 (hardcover, ISBN 978-1-4088-1573-1).
- The Attacking Ocean: The Past, Present, and Future of Rising Sea Levels. New York: Bloomsbury Press, 2013 ISBN 978-1-60819-692-0.
- A Brief History of Archaeology: Classical Times to the Twenty-First Century (2017, with Nadia Durrani) Routledge
- In the Beginning (14th edition, 2020, with Nadia Durrani), Routledge
- People of the Earth (15th edition, 2018, with Nadia Durrani), Routledge
- Ancient North America (5th edition, 2019), Thames & Hudson
- Ancient Lives (7th edition, 2020, with Nadia Durrani), Routledge
- World Prehistory (9th edition, 2019, with Nadia Durrani), Routledge
- Ancient Civilizations (4th edition, 2016, with Chris Scarre), Routledge
- Archaeology: A Brief Introduction (12th edition, 2016, with Nadia Durrani), Routledge
- Fishing: How the Sea Fed Civilization, New Haven and London: Yale University Press, 2017. ISBN 978-0-30024-004-7
- What We Did in Bed: A Horizontal History (with Nadia Durrani), New Haven and London: Yale University Press, 2019. ISBN 978-0-30022-388-0
- Bigger Than History: Why Archaeology Matters (2019, with Nadia Durrani) Thames and Hudson
- Climate Chaos: Lessons on Survival from our Ancestors (2021, with Nadia Durrani) Hachette
- World Prehistory: The Basics (2021, with Nadia Durrani) Routledge
- Archaeology: The Basics (2022, with Nadia Durrani) Routledge
- Hunting: The Pursuit That Shaped Humanity. New Haven and London: Yale University Press, 2025 ISBN 978-0-30027-349-6
