= Sophus Müller =

Danish archaeologist

Sophus Otto Müller
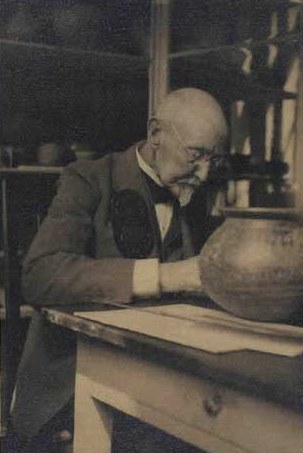
- Sophus Müller
- Born: 24 May 1846; Copenhagen, Denmark
- Died: 24 February 1934 (aged 87); Frederiksberg, Denmark
- Occupation: archaeologist

Sophus Otto Müller (24 May 1846 - 23 February 1934) was a Danish archaeologist.

== Biography ==
He was born in Copenhagen, the son of C. Louis Müller. Sophus studied classical philology at Copenhagen University, graduating cand.philol. in 1871. He conducted a study trip to Germany, Switzerland, and Italy during 1872-73. He became a teacher until 1876, while assisting at the National Museum of Denmark. He was hired by the museum in 1878, and graduated with a Ph.D. in 1880 with the essay Dyreornamentiken i Norden.

He discovered the single burial mounds of central Jutland. This discovery was the first proof of Middle Neolithic Periods in Scandinavia.

After 1881 he was secretary at the Royal Archaeological Society and edited Aarböger for Nordisk Oldkyndighed and Nordiske Fortidsminder. In 1885, he was an inspector at the museum, then, when the museum was being re-organized as the Danish National Museum, he was the director of the ancient history section in 1892. In 1895, he was named the museum's director.

In 1888, his two-volume work Ordning af Danmarks Oldsager (The Arrangement of Denmark's Antiquities) was published. He wrote a prehistory of Denmark, which was published as Vor Oldtid (Our Prehistory) in 1897.He retired from the museum in 1921.

Müller became a Knight of Order of the Dannebrog 1889, Dannebrogsmand 1901, Commander of 2nd degree 1913 and of 1st degree 1921. He died at Frederiksberg and was buried at Skoven Kirkegård.

== See also ==
- Gundestrup cauldron
