= Scandinavian prehistory =

The Scandinavian Peninsula became ice-free around the end of the last ice age. The Nordic Stone Age begins at that time, with the Upper Paleolithic Ahrensburg culture, giving way to the Mesolithic hunter-gatherers by the 7th millennium BC (Maglemosian culture c. 7500 – 6000 BC, Kongemose culture c. 6000 – 5200 BC, Ertebølle culture c. 5300 – 3950 BC). The Neolithic stage is marked by the Funnelbeaker culture (4000–2700 BC), followed by the Pitted Ware culture (3200–2300 BC).

Around 2800 BC, metal was introduced in Scandinavia in the Corded Ware culture. In much of Scandinavia, a Battle Axe culture became prominent, known from some 3,000 graves. The period 2500–500 BC also left many visible remains to modern times, most notably the many thousands rock carvings (petroglyphs) in western Sweden at Tanumshede and in Norway at Alta. A more advanced culture came with the Nordic Bronze Age (c. 2000/1750 – 500 BC). It was followed by the Iron Age in the 4th century BC.

== After the last ice age ==
Europe during the Last Glacial Maximum c. 20,000 years ago

Ancylus Lake c. 10,000 years ago. "Svea älv" was a strait within the lake while Göta älv formed an outlet to the Atlantic Sea.

The density of archaeological sites in Sweden

The pre-history of Scandinavia begins at the end of the Pleistocene epoch, following the last glacial period's receding Fenno-Scandian ice sheet.

Parts of Denmark, Scania and the Norwegian coastline were free from ice by around 13,000 BC, and around 10,000 BC the rim of ice was around Dalsland, Västergötland and Östergötland. It was not until 7000 BC that all of Svealand and the modern coastal regions of northeastern Sweden were free of ice, although the huge weight of the ice sheet had caused isostatic depression of Fennoscandia, placing large parts of eastern Sweden and western Finland under water.

In Scandinavia, the period following the last ice age begins around circa 9500 BC. It is divided into:

1. the Yoldia Stage, after the Yoldia Sea,
2. the Ancylus Stage, after the Ancylus Lake in turn named after Ancylus fluviatilis, a small fresh-water gastropod from that time. At that time, Denmark and Sweden were joined, and the "Baltic Sea" of the age was a fresh water lake called the Ancylus Lake.
3. The Ancylus age is followed by formation of the Littorina Sea and the Litorina Stage (named after the Littorina littorea mollusc) at around 6200 BC.

With the first human colonization of this new land (the territory of modern Sweden was partly under water though, and with radically different coastlines) during the Ancylus and Litorina stages begins the Nordic Stone Age. In recent years there have been archaeological finds in caves which strongly suggest human inhabitation of Scandinavia before the Weichsel glaciation, at least 50,000 years ago, presumably by Neanderthals.

== Stone age ==
=== Upper Paleolithic ===
As the ice receded reindeer grazed on the plains of Denmark and southernmost Sweden. This was the land of the Ahrensburg culture, whose members hunted over territories 100,000 km^{2} vast and lived in teepees on the tundra. On this land there was little forest but arctic white birch and rowan, but the taiga slowly appeared.

=== Mesolithic ===
The Scandinavian peninsula was the last part of Europe to be colonized after the Last Glacial Maximum. The migration routes, cultural networks, and the genetic makeup of the first Scandinavians remain elusive and several hypotheses exist based on archaeology, climate modeling, and genetics. Analysis of genomes of early Scandinavian Hunter-Gatherers (SHGs) from the cave Stora Förvar on Stora Karlsö, Stora Bjers on Gotland, Hummervikholmen in Norway showed that migrations followed two routes: one from the south and another from the northeast along the ice-free Norwegian Atlantic coast. These groups met and mixed in Scandinavia, creating a population more diverse than contemporaneous central and western European hunter-gatherers.

In the 7th millennium BC, when the reindeer and their hunters had moved for northern Scandinavia, forests had been established in the land. A culture called the Maglemosian culture lived in Denmark and southern Sweden, and north of them, in Norway and most of southern Sweden, the Fosna-Hensbacka culture, who lived mostly along the shores of the thriving forests. Utilizing fire, boats and stone tools enabled these Stone Age inhabitants to survive life in northern Europe. The northern hunter/gatherers followed the herds and the salmon runs, moving south during the winters, and moving north again during the summers. These early peoples followed cultural traditions similar to those practiced throughout other regions in the far-north areas, including modern Finland, Russia, and across the Bering Strait into the northernmost strip of North America (containing portions of today's Alaska and Canada)

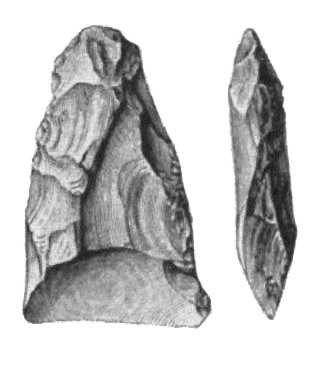
Flake axe typical of the Ertebølle culture.

The Maglemosian people lived in forest and wetland environments using fishing and hunting tools made from wood, bone and flint microliths. A characteristic of the culture are the sharply edged microliths of flintstone which were used for spear heads and arrowheads. Microliths finds are more sparse from c. 6000 BC and the period is said to transit into the Kongemose culture (c. 6000–5200 BC). The finds from this period are characterised by long flintstone flakes which were used for making the characteristic rhombic arrowheads, scrapers, drills, awls and toothed blades.

During the 6th millennium BC, southern Scandinavia was clad in lush forests of temperate broadleaf and mixed forests. In these forests roamed animals such as aurochs, wisent, moose and red deer. Now, the Kongemose culture lived off these animals. Like their predecessors, they also hunted seals and fished in the rich waters. North of the Kongemose people, lived other hunter-gatherers in most of southern Norway and Sweden, called the Nøstvet and Lihult cultures, descendants of the Fosna and Hensbacka cultures. These cultures still hunted, in the end of the 6th millennium BC when the Kongemose culture was replaced by the Ertebølle culture in the south.

=== Neolithic ===
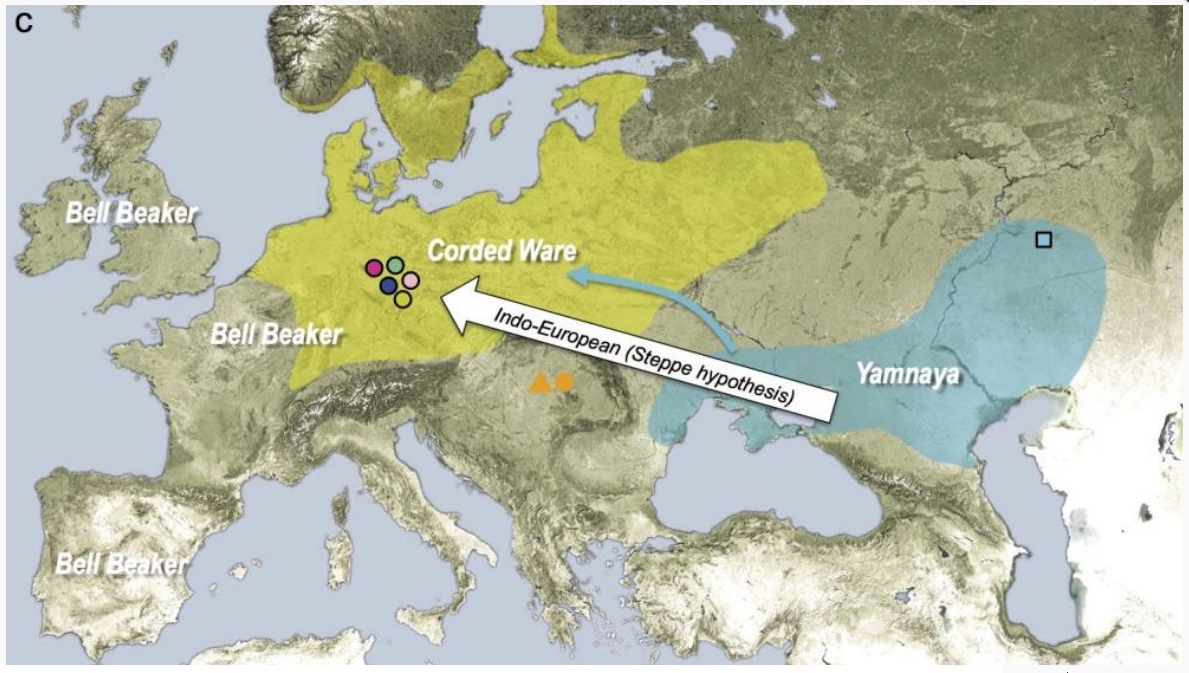
The Battle-Axe culture was an offshoot of the Corded Ware culture, and replaced the Funnelbeaker culture in southern Scandinavia, probably through a process of mass migration and population replacement.

During the 5th millennium BC, the Ertebølle culture took up point-based pottery, from human groups in the eastern Baltic areas (Narva). About 4000 BC south Scandinavia up to River Dalälven in Sweden became part of the Funnelbeaker culture (4000–2700 BC), a culture that originated in southern parts of Europe and slowly advanced up through today's Uppland, Sweden. In southern Scandinavia it replaced the Ertebølle culture, which had maintained a Mesolithic lifestyle for about 1500 years after farming arrived in Central Europe. Tribes along the coasts of Svealand, Götaland, Åland, northeastern Denmark and southern Norway learnt new technologies that became the Pitted Ware culture (3200–2300 BC). The Pitted Ware culture then developed along Sweden's east coast as a return to a hunting economy in the mid-4th millennium BC (see the Alvastra pile-dwelling).

Genetically, the Funnelbeaker culture population was of Neolithic Anatolian origin with a proportion of Hunter-gatherer ancestries. This archaeological culture is well-known for its intensive building of enclsoures and megalithic tombs, which are very similar to those found in many regions of western Europe. Before medieval and modern church building requeired stones and before modern land use started, the number of megaliths in northern Germany and Southern Scandinavia was much higher than today. In Denmark, 2,800 monuments are registered and about 7,300 additional examples existed. In northern Germany, Johannes Müller reports 11,658 known monuments. He expects about 75.000 megaliths to have originally been constructed. Additionally, in the distribution area of this culture, thousands of deposition of (partly extremely large 40–50 cm or more) flint axes appear and finely made battle axes (often double axes) of hard stone.

Towards the end of the 3rd millennium BC, they were overrun by new groups who many scholars think spoke Proto-Indo-European, the Battle-Axe culture. This new people with Steppe-derived ancestry advanced up to Uppland and the Oslofjord, and they probably provided the language that was the ancestor of the modern Scandinavian languages. This new culture had the battle axe as a status symbol, and were cattle herders.

== Bronze Age ==
The density of petroglyphs and cup marks in Sweden. Petroglyphs have also been found in northern Sweden, for example Nämforsen, Glösa and Gärdesån.

During the Nordic Bronze Age from c. 1700–500 BC, an advanced civilization appears in Denmark, parts of Sweden and parts of Norway. They manufactured bronze tools and weapons as well as jewellery and artifacts of bronze and gold. All the bronze and gold was imported and it has been assumed that the civilization was founded in amber trade, through contacts with Central European and Mediterranean cultures.

The period between 2300 and 500 BC was the most intensive petroglyph-carving period in Scandinavia, with carvings depicting agricultural activities, animals, nature, hunts, ships, ceremonies, warfare, etc.. Petroglyphs with themes of a sexual nature have also been found in Bohuslän, dating from 800 to 500 BC.

== Iron Age ==
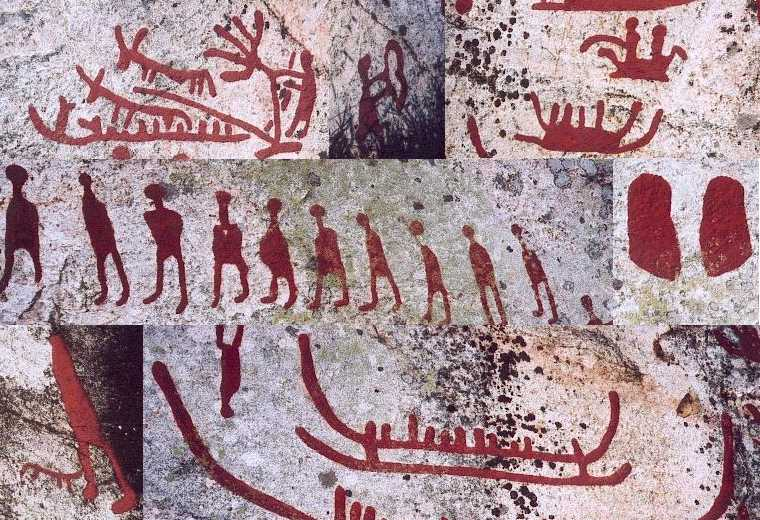
Petroglyphs from Scandinavia (Häljesta, Västmanland in Sweden). Composite image.

See also the separate articles on the Pre-Roman Iron Age, the Vendel Age, and the Roman Iron Age

Tacitus (about 98 AD) described a nation called "Suiones" living on an island in the Ocean. These Suiones had ships that were peculiar because they had a prow in both ends (the shape we recognise as Viking ships). This word Suiones is the same name as in Anglo-Saxon Sweon whose country in Angle-Saxon was called Sweoland (Svealand). In Beowulf, this tribe is also called Sweoðeod, from which the name Sweden is derived, and the country has the name Sweorice, which is an old form, in Old English (Anglo-Saxon), of the present Swedish name for Sweden, Sverige.

In the 6th century the Ostrogoth Jordanes mentioned a tribe named Suehans which is the same name as Tacitus' Suiones. He also unwittingly described the same tribe by a different name, the Suetidi which is the same as an old name for Sweden, Svíþjóð and the English Sweoðeod.

Several sources, such as Beowulf, Ynglingatal, Ynglinga saga, Saxo Grammaticus and Historia Norwegiae, mention a number of Swedish kings who lived in the 6th century, such as Eadgils, Ohthere and Onela, as well as a number of Geatish kings. Some of these kings were in all likelihood historic kings, although the sources sometimes give contradictory information, such as the death of Ottar. See Mythological kings of Sweden and Semi-legendary kings of Sweden.

One of the most powerful kings was the Swedish king who according to early sources only ruled what is today eastern Svealand. It is unknown when it happened and it probably happened several times, but when sources become more reliable the territories of the Swedish kings include Västergötland and other parts of Götaland. This stage is by some considered to be the beginning of Sweden, as we know it today.

== See also ==
- Sami history
- Prehistoric Sweden
