= Nålebinding =

Single-needle textile netting technique

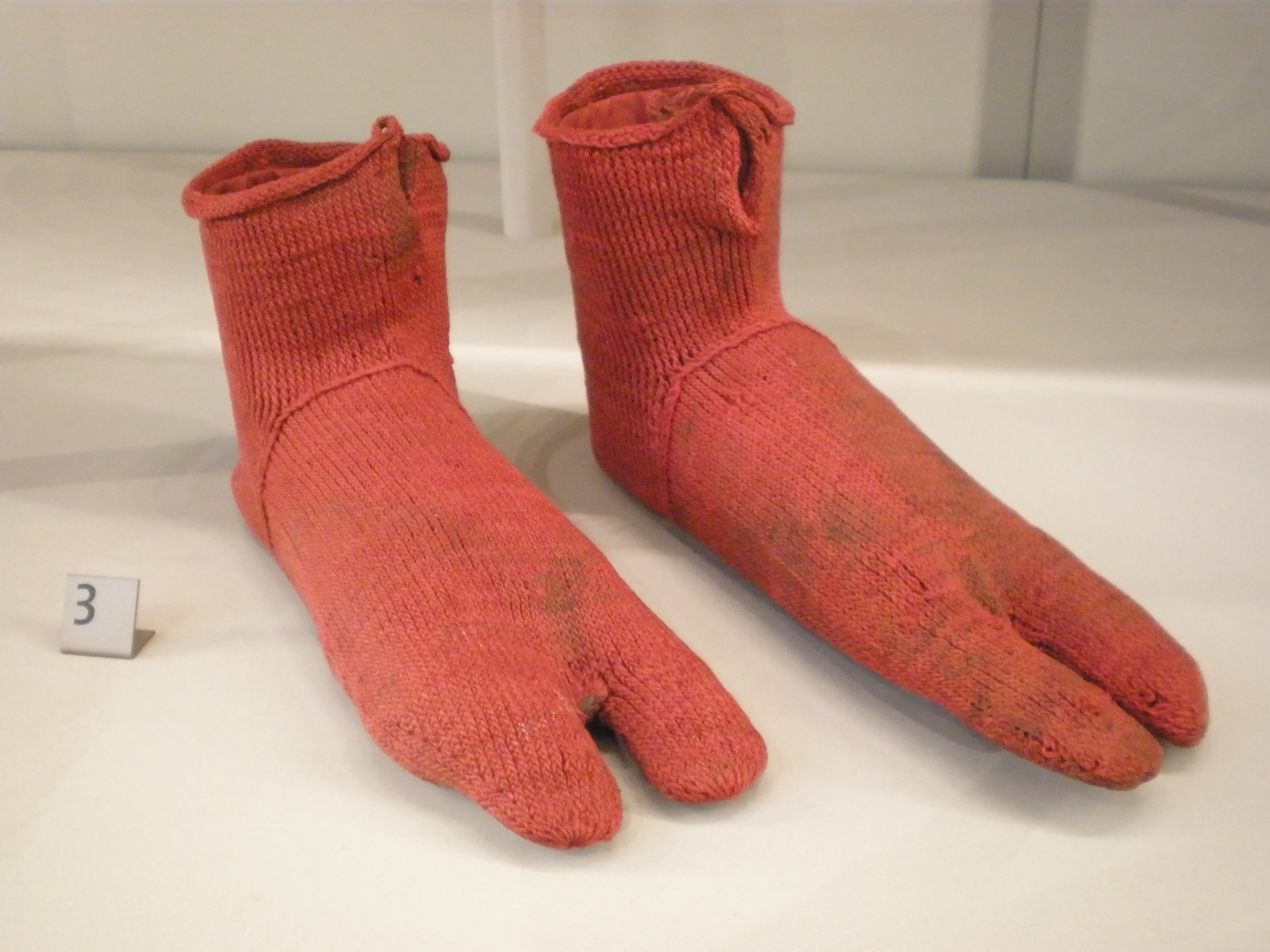
Nålebound socks from Egypt, Victoria and Albert Museum (c. 250–420 CE)

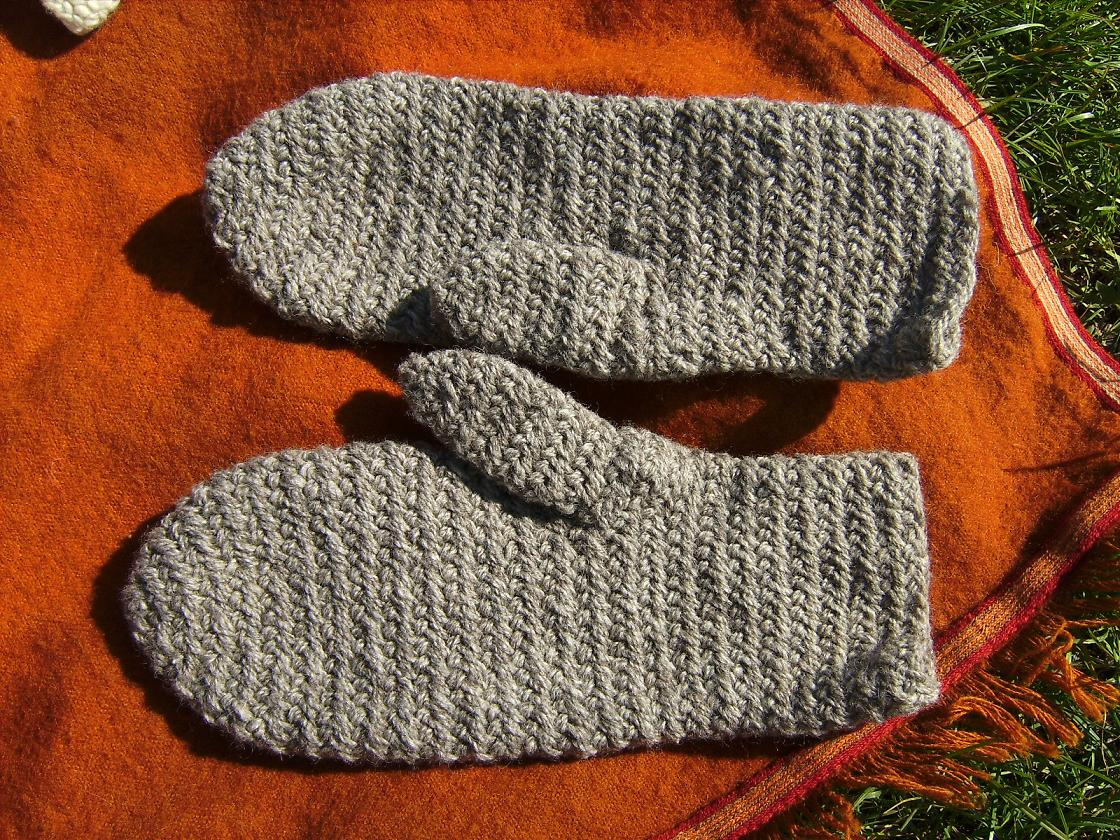
Needle-bound mittens, Germany (contemporary)

Needle-bound socks, Germany (contemporary)

Nålebinding (Swedish, Danish and Norwegian: literally 'binding with a needle' or 'needle-binding', also naalbinding, nålbinding, nålbindning, or naalebinding) is a fabric creation technique predating both knitting and crochet. Also known in English as "knotless netting", "knotless knitting", or "single-needle knitting", the technique is distinct from crochet in that it involves passing the full length of the working thread through each loop, unlike crochet, where the work is formed only of loops, never involving the free end. It also differs from knitting in that lengths must be pieced together during the process of nålebinding, rather than a continuous strand of yarn that can easily be pulled out. Archaeological specimens of fabric made by nålebinding can be difficult to distinguish from knitted fabric.

Nålebinding is still practiced by women of the Nanti tribe, an indigenous people of the Camisea region of Peru. They use it to make bracelets. Nålebinding also remains popular in the Nordic countries, as well as in the Balkans.

== History ==
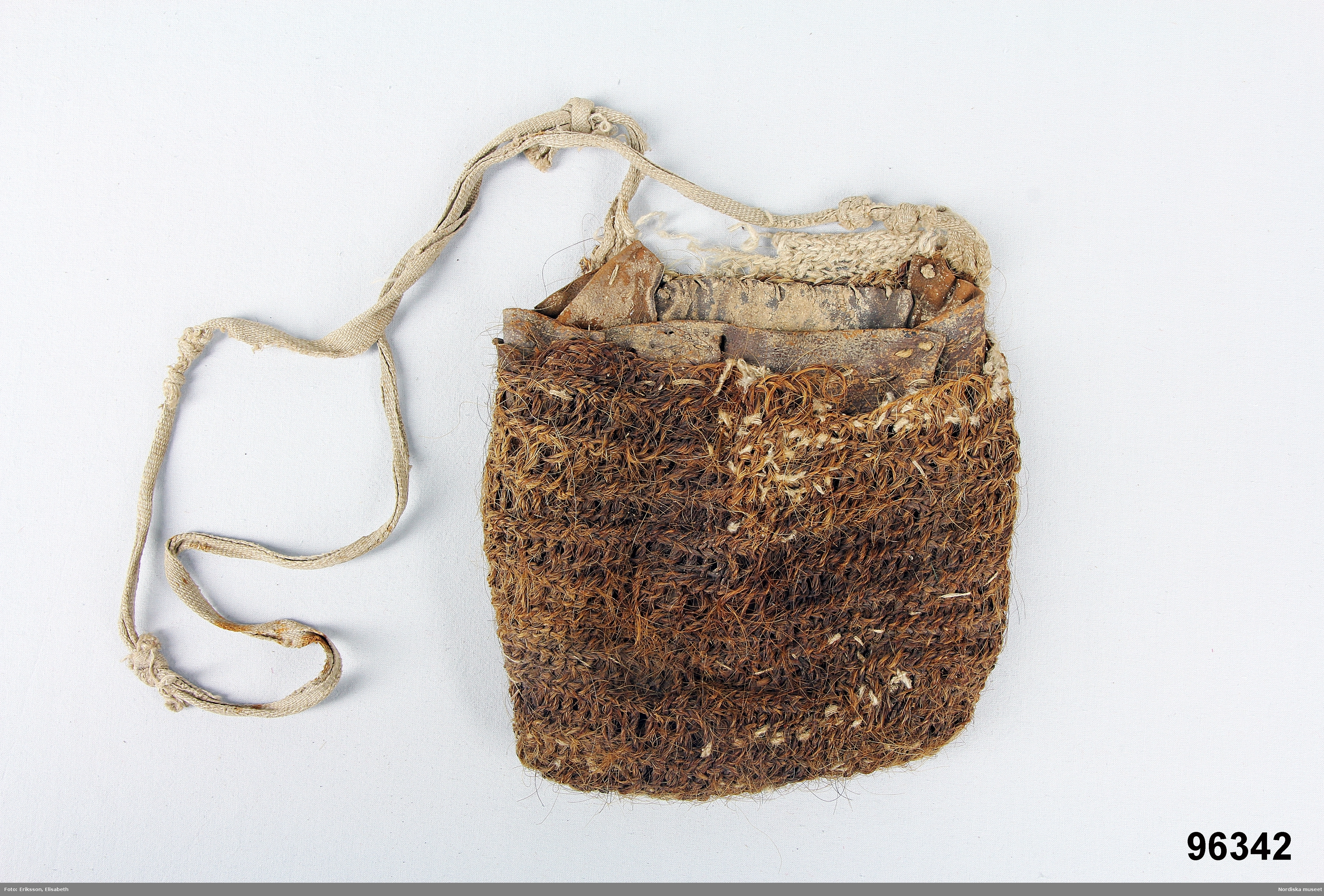
Slekskräppa bag made from goat hair and lined with leather, Nordic Museum

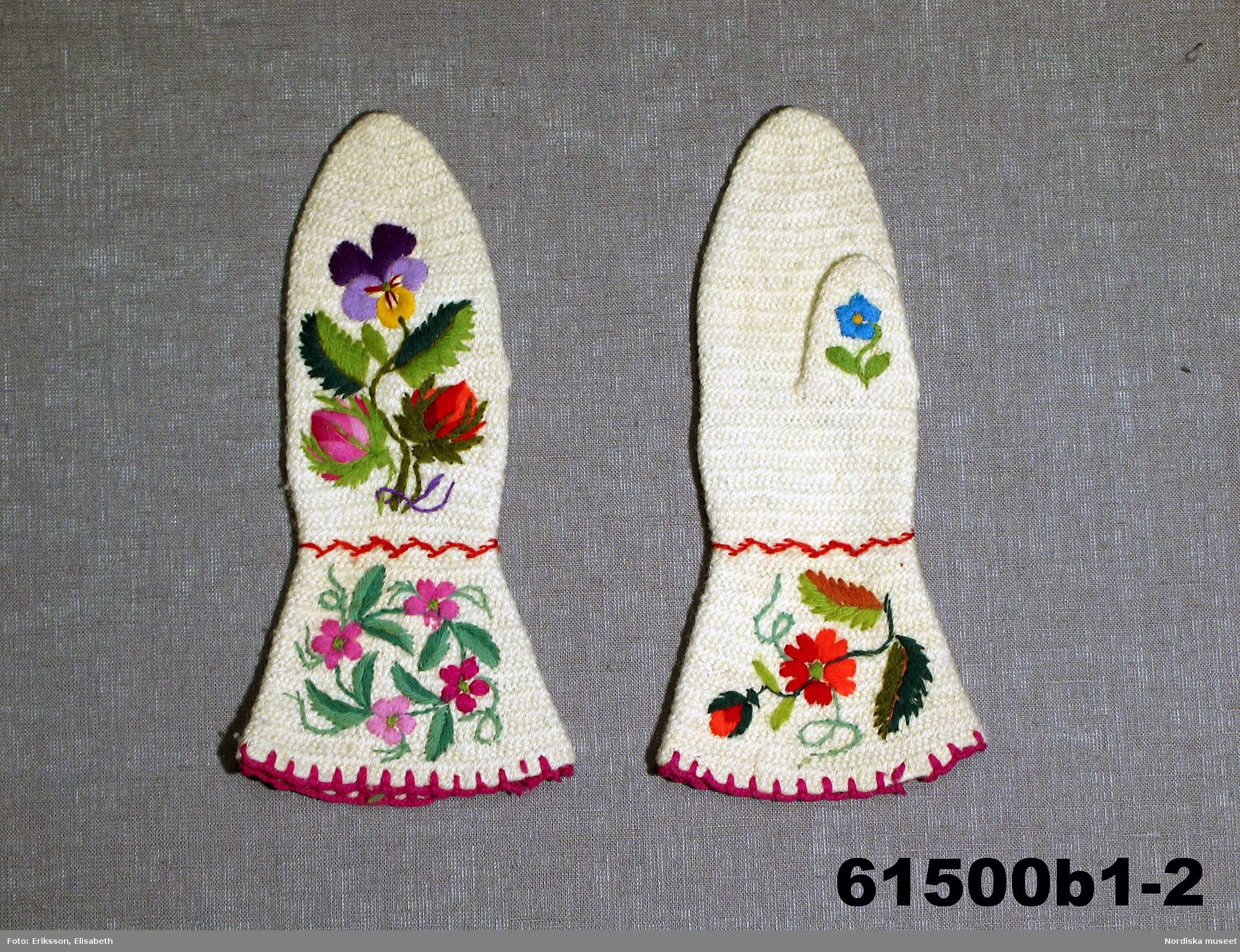
Swedish nålebinding mittens, Nordic Museum (late 19th century)

The oldest known textile fragment of nålebinding, dating from c. 6500 BCE, was found in Nahal Hemar Cave, in the Judean Desert. Another made of lime bast fibre, from the Ertebølle period c. 4200 BCE was found in Tybrind Vig, a Mesolithic fishing village in Denmark.

The oldest known samples of single-needle knitted clothing include the color-patterned sandal socks of the Coptic Christians of Egypt (4th century CE), and hats and shawls from the Paracas and Nazca cultures in Peru, dated between 300 BCE and 300 CE.

Historically needles were made out of wood, antler, or bone. Contemporary selections also include plastic.

Nålebinding predates knitting and crochet. Historical samples have often been misidentified as knitting due to how similar they can appear in the finished products if made using the Coptic stitch. Often a textile historian will need to closely follow the path of the yarn itself to identify the item as either knitting or nålebinding. This is possible by knowing the textile structures created by the two crafts and identifying those within the fabric or by looking for a frequent use of joining of strands.

Nålebinding was used during the Viking age of 793–1066 CE in Scandinavia before knitting and crochet were known. This was an effective method for them to create sturdy, serviceable garments.

Nålebinding requires working with several short pieces of yarn, each usually 1.5 to 2 meters long. As the work progresses, another piece is connected by felting – dampening the ends and rolling them together between the palms of the hands – thus creating the appearance of one continuous thread.

The term "nålebinding" was introduced in the 1970s.

A famous piece of nålebinding is the 'Coppergate sock' found during an excavation of the Coppergate area of York. A clear Viking influence in the textiles was found in the finds in this area. This was a wool sock that had been created using a technique never before recorded in England. The sock was slipper-like in style and would have covered the whole foot.

Nålebinding was used in some regions of Northern Europe until the 1950s, when it most likely declined because of the changes in the textile industry and almost disappeared. It later gained renewed interest among many textile historians, archaeologists, craftspeople, and reenactors, so that it is today an exotic but well-kept handicraft tradition.

== Technique ==
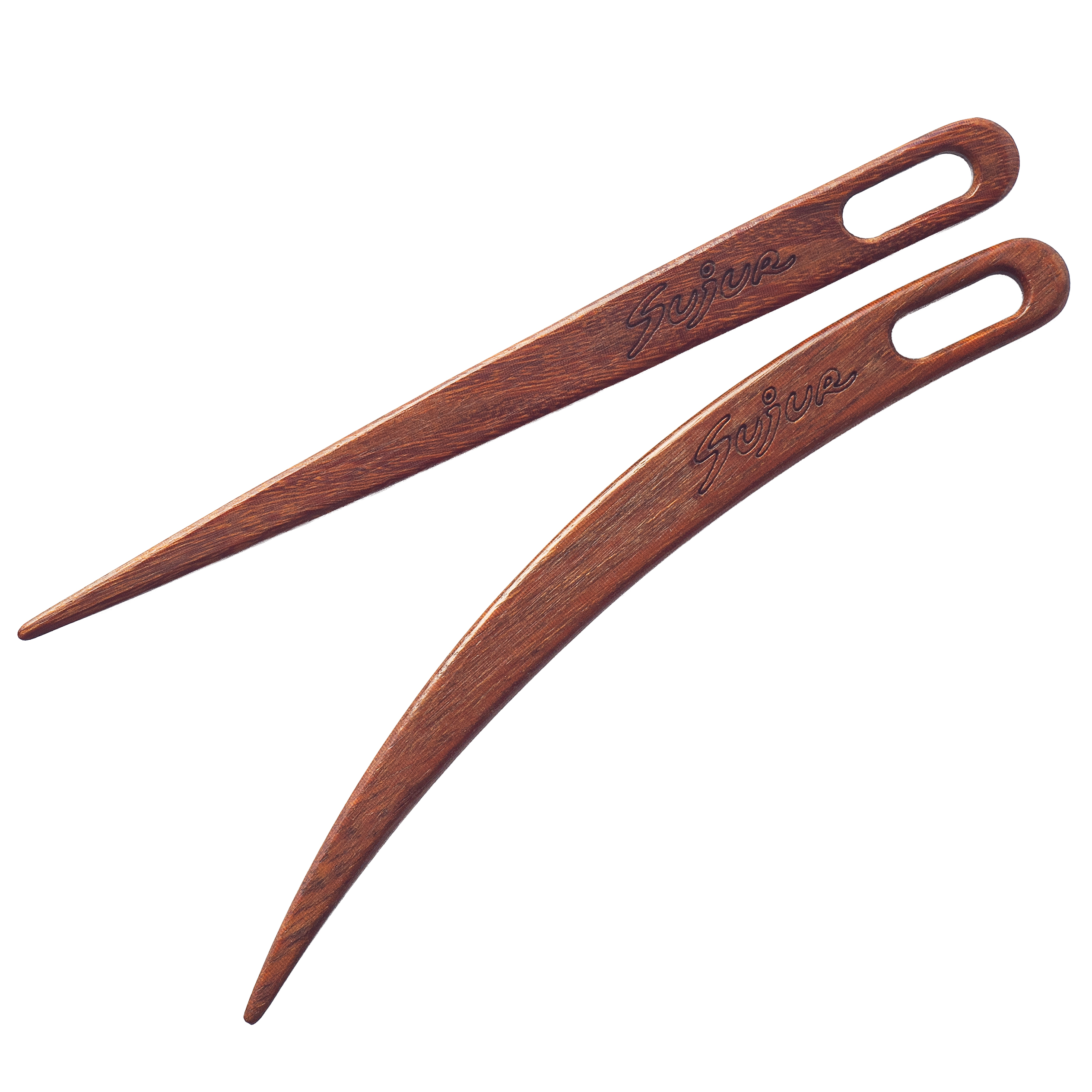
Straight and curved nålebinding needles made of ipe hardwood

The method creates an elastic fabric using short lengths of yarn and a single-eyed needle that is often broad and flat. The stitches are commonly, but not invariably, gauged by wrapping them around the thumb. In its simplest form, the needle is passed through a seed loop to form a new loop, taking care to avoid tightening either into a firm knot. The needle is then passed through the new loop, repeating the process until a chain of desired length has been formed. Subsequent stitches are formed in the same manner but are also joined laterally to the corresponding stitch in the chain. The extended process is similarly repeated with reference to the preceding row rather than the initial chain. Fabric is commonly worked in a single direction – "in the round" – forming spirals and tubes for socks and mittens. The work may also be turned at the end of a row for fabric "worked flat".

Crafters nowadays often use a specialised notation called the Hansen code to create patterns and communicate about the nålebinding technique. This code has been developed in 1990 by Egon Hansen, an expert on textile reconstruction who worked at the Moesgård Museum in Denmark. The Hansen code is a coding system used to indicate the path of the needle as it is worked through the preexisting fabric, with its passage under a loop shown as U and over a loop as O. A slash shows where the yarn changes direction and returns through loops it has already passed. If a loop is skipped an O or a U is put in brackets. If there is more than one change of direction a colon is used. The connection to the previous row is described using the letter F (if the yarn passes through the loop from the front) or B (if the yarn passes through the loop from the back), as well as a number to show how many loops are worked in this way. Stitches that can be described in this manner vary significantly in appearance, texture, and elasticity. As an example, the Coppergate sock described above was made in York stitch, or UU/OO O F2. As an example to show the use of brackets and colons, the Ålse stitch is U(U)O/UO:UO O. Some people prefer to use superscript numbers to describe the age of the passed loops, as it provides a clearer description for practical nålebinding than the brackets and colons.

Wool yarn is often used because short lengths of it can easily be joined, as the technique intrinsically requires. However, yarn made of fibers that do not felt as easily can be joined in other ways.

In the construction of the 'Coppergate sock', the work began at the toe and worked in circular rows. Looping continued by the passing of the needle through two loops of the previous row, one of which had already been worked, and then brought back through the last two loops of the current row. A heavy, thick fabric was created with great elasticity. No loose ends were visible and are thought to be joined by splicing or having been stitched into the fabric. Shaping was achieved by adding an extra loop or leaving a lower loop out of the sequence. The heel had been turned back on itself several times to create the heel shaping.

Execution of selected stitches (thumb method)

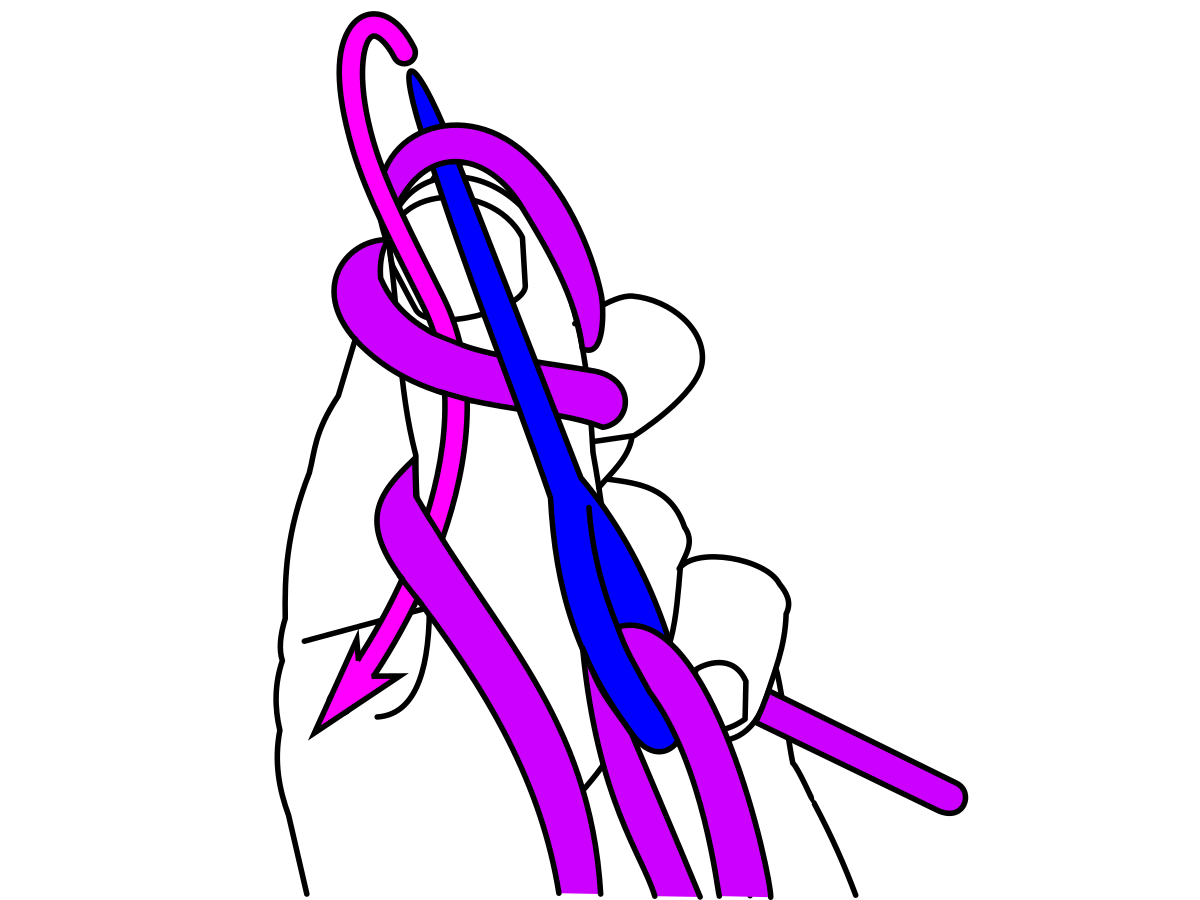
Oslo stitch

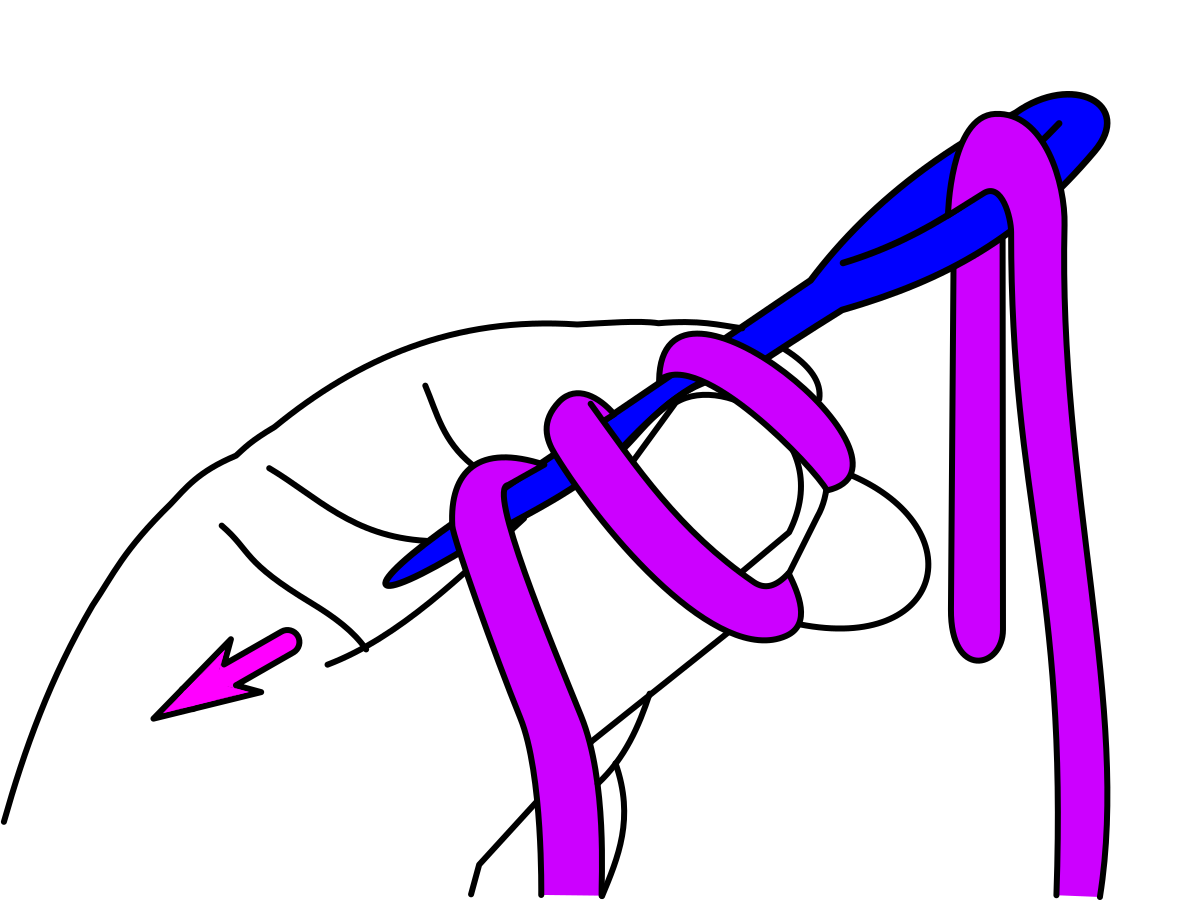
York stitch

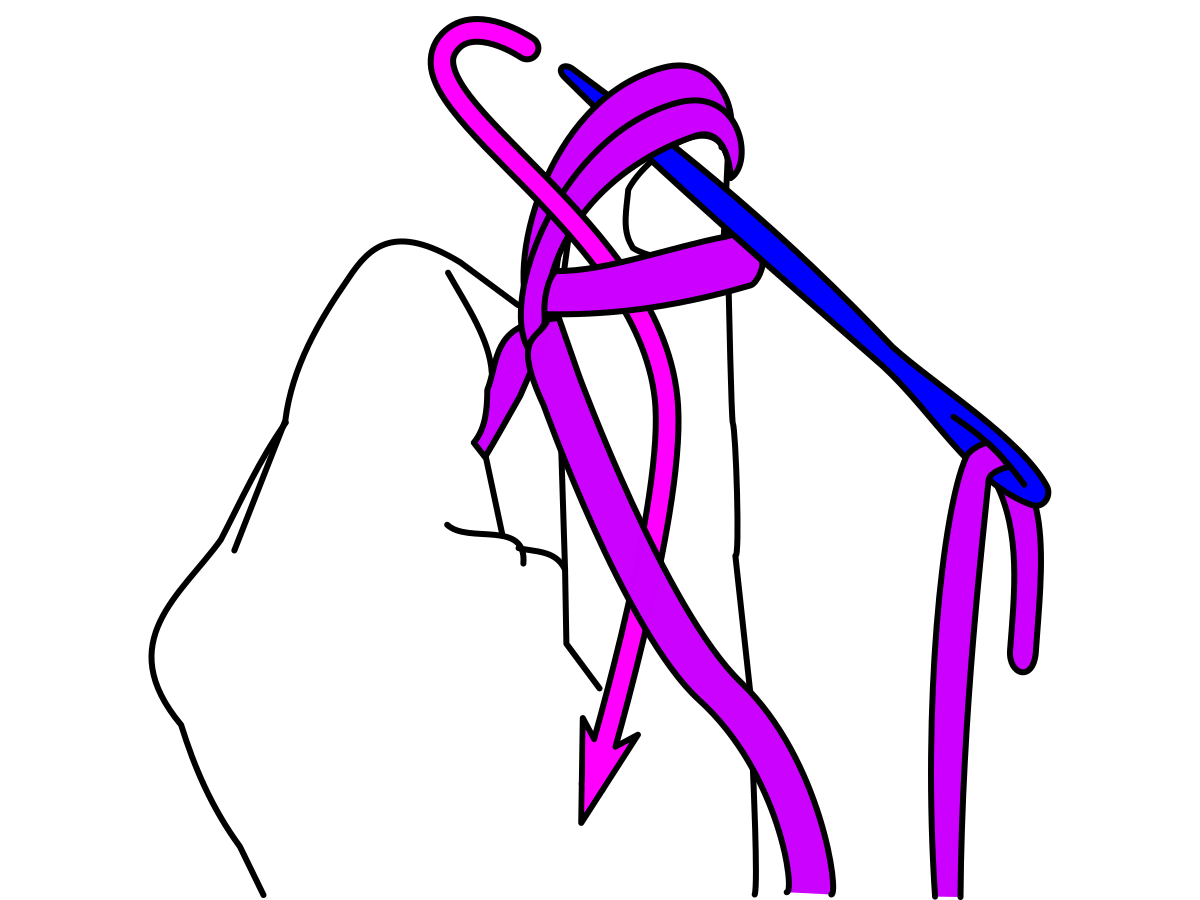
Mammen stitch

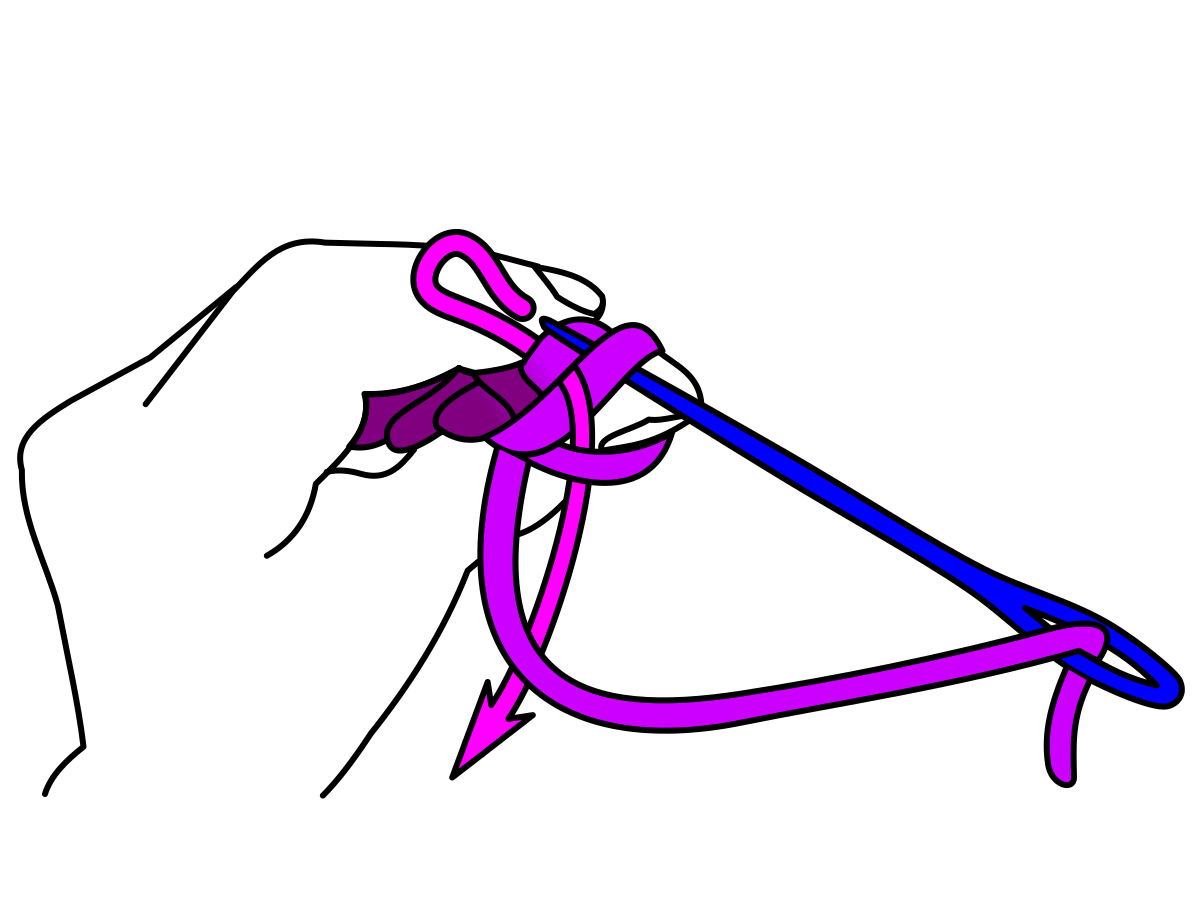
Dalby stitch

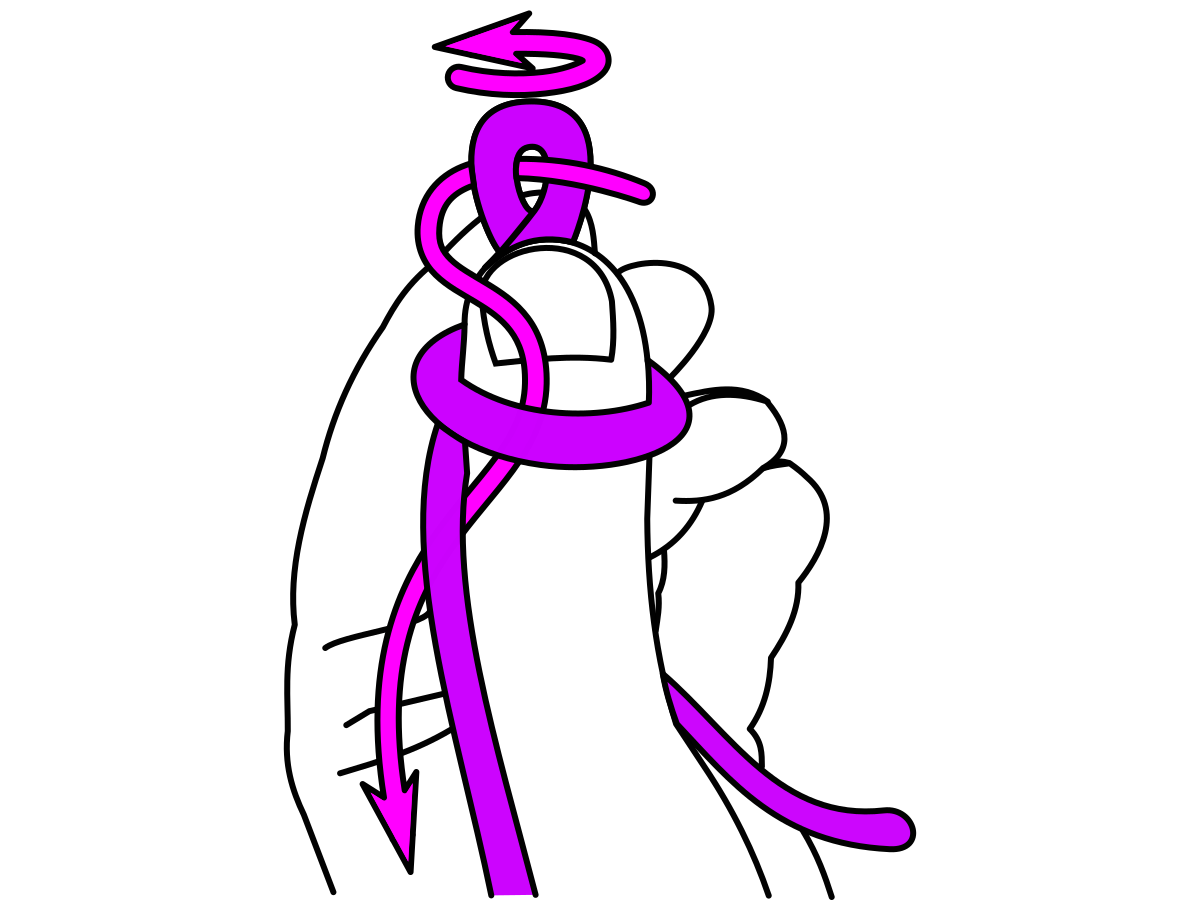
Simple turn stitch

== Characteristics ==
Nålebinding is often called more laborious and slower than knitting. This is not necessarily true, especially for the simpler stitches, such as the Oslo-, Mammen-, and Brodén-stitches. Although each stitch might take slightly longer than a knitted one, nålebinding is often quicker than knitting, because each row's height (in the most common nålebinding-techniques) corresponds to 2–3 rows of knitting. It is also easier on the shoulders, back, and hands, and the fabric it produces can be more dense and durable than knitted fabric. It is still used in Peru and Iran to make socks, and in parts of northern Europe to make hats, gloves and other items that are very warm.

Another common mistake is to think of nålebinding as superior to knitting, because it requires more skill. It is considered relatively easy to learn and master; given proper instruction, even the more complex techniques are possible to learn with comparably little prior knowledge. It can create different textiles, thin and flexible ones as well as thick and comparably stiff ones, depending on which technique is used.

Nålebinding does not unravel and therefore special finishing borders are not necessary.

== General and cited references ==
- Briansdotter, Sigrid (2004). Nalbinding Made Easy. Talisman Press.
- Briansdotter, Sigrid. Nalbinding: The Asle Mitten Stitch.
- Classen-Büttner, Ulrike (2015). Nalbinding: What in the World Is That? ISBN 9783734787751
- Eddie (10 April 2011). Historic Crafts – Nalbinding how-to.
- Kallner, Donna (2009). New Age Looping: A Handbook for Fiber Artists. White Lake, WI: Wolf Moon. OCLC 848390637.
- Mellgren, Nusse (2008). Nålbindning: The Easiest, Clearest Ever Guide (in Swedish). Röstånga: Urd. ISBN 9789163329746.
- Rutt, Richard (2003). A History of Hand Knitting. Loveland, CO: Interweave Press. ISBN 1931499373.
- Thomenius, Erika (2006). A Beginner's Guide to Naalbinding. LCCN 2018303101.
- Thomenius, Erika (2009). Turning Heels: A Look at Structures in Naalbinding.
- Bernhard's Nadelbinden
- Wills, Kerry (2007). The Close-Knit Circle: American Knitters Today. Greenwood Press. p. 7. ISBN 978-0-275-99246-0.
