= Archaeology of Scandinavia =

Archaeology of Scandinavia is the study of human prehistory and early history in the region comprising modern-day Denmark, Norway, and Sweden, as well as parts of Finland and Iceland. It encompasses cultural developments from the earliest human presence following the last Ice Age through the Viking Age and into the early medieval period.

== History of research ==
=== Early antiquarianism ===
Interest in ancient monuments in Scandinavia dates back to the early modern period. During the 16th and 17th centuries, scholars and antiquarians documented runestones, burial mounds, and other monumental sites, often motivated by emerging national identities.

In Sweden, state-sponsored antiquarian activity was institutionalized under the Swedish Crown, leading to one of the earliest heritage protection systems in Europe. Early figures such as Olaus Magnus described ancient customs and monuments; however, their interpretations remained largely speculative. By the 18th century, antiquarian collections had expanded, and museums began to emerge, helping to establish the foundations of scientific archaeology.

=== Development of scientific archaeology ===
Modern archaeology in Scandinavia began in the early 19th century, particularly in Denmark. A major intellectual advancement was the formulation of the Three Age System by Christian Jürgensen Thomsen. Working at the National Museum of Denmark, Thomsen classified artifacts into three chronological periods: the Stone Age, the Bronze Age, and the Iron Age.

By the late 19th century, archaeology in Scandinavia became institutionalized within universities and museums. National heritage organizations were established in Sweden and Norway, promoting systematic surveys and excavations.

A significant intellectual contribution of this period was the development of typology, particularly through the work of Oscar Montelius. Montelius refined chronological sequences by comparing artifact styles across regions, thereby establishing more precise dating systems for the Bronze Age. His work contributed to the development of cross-dating techniques, seriation methods, and regional chronological frameworks.

=== 20th-century developments ===
In the early 20th century, Scandinavian archaeology became closely associated with the culture-historical approach, which aimed to define archaeological cultures based on material remains. This period also witnessed extensive excavations of Viking Age sites, including ship burials such as the Oseberg ship burial in Norway (excavated 1904–1905).

Archaeology became a primary source for understanding the earliest political history of Denmark. Advances in methodology, including large-scale settlement excavations and improved dating techniques, particularly dendrochronology have significantly enhanced research accuracy. For example, dendrochronological analysis has enabled scholars to date the original burial chamber of Gorm the Old to 958, as well as to establish precise construction dates for major structures such as the Danevirke, the Kanhave Canal, and the early phases of the town of Ribe.

=== Large-scale excavations and rescue archaeology ===
A shift toward large-scale archaeological investigations began following the 1955 fire at the Bryggen in Bergen, which led to what was then the largest urban excavation in northern Europe. This was followed in 1961 by the first major excavation of medieval districts in central Lund.

These projects established new standards for archaeological practice; however, a significant expansion in such work did not occur until around 1970. From that point onward, rescue excavations associated with urban development became common practice in Norway, Sweden, and Finland.

== Recent discoveries ==
In April 2024, metal detectorists discovered a small bronze fitting near Ringsted on the island of Zealand in Denmark, depicting the face of Alexander the Great. Measuring approximately 3 cm in diameter, the object dates to the Roman period, around the 2nd–3rd century CE, and shows a deified representation of Alexander with characteristic features such as wavy hair and ram’s horns associated with Zeus-Ammon. Archaeologists suggest the fitting may have been attached to a shield or similar object and is comparable to finds from Illerup Ådal, a site linked to ritual weapon deposits following conflict.

In March 2024, archaeologists from the Jönköping County Museum uncovered a 12th-century grave during excavations at Brahe Church on the island of Visingsö in Sweden. The burial contained a concentration of silver coins placed near the feet of the deceased, discovered alongside human skeletal remains during groundwork for a geothermal installation. The coins, dating to around 850 years ago, suggest that the individual may have held a certain level of wealth or status, while also reflecting medieval funerary customs involving the deposition of valuables.

In June 2024, archaeologists investigating the grounds of Jarlsberg Manor in southeastern Norway confirmed the remains of a previously unknown Viking ship burial after uncovering around 70 iron rivets that once formed part of the vessel. The discovery followed earlier geophysical surveys and renewed excavations at a site long suspected to contain significant Viking Age remains. Although little of the wooden structure survives, the rivets provide clear evidence of a large ship comparable in scale to known Viking vessels, suggesting the burial of a high-status individual.

In July 2024, Polish divers from the Baltictech group discovered a well-preserved 19th-century shipwreck approximately 20 nautical miles south of the island of Öland, Sweden, containing a cargo of more than 100 bottles of champagne, mineral water, and porcelain. The vessel, believed to have sunk around 170 years ago, was found in remarkably good condition due to the cold, low-oxygen environment of the Baltic Sea, which aids preservation. Analysis of stamped clay bottles identified mineral water from the German brand Selters, helping date the wreck to the mid-19th century (c. 1850–1867). Researchers suggest the cargo may have been destined for elite consumers, possibly including the Russian imperial court, highlighting long-distance trade networks and the transport of luxury commodities during the period.

In June 2025, archaeologists excavating a site on Senja Island in northern Norway uncovered a Viking Age boat burial dating to around AD 900–950, revealing the remains of a woman interred within a 5.4-meter-long wooden boat. The burial, initially identified by metal detectorists, contained grave goods such as brooches, beads, and textile-related tools, indicating the high social status of the individual. The skeleton of a small dog was found carefully placed at her feet.

In June 2025, archaeologists uncovered a Viking Age burial site near Lisbjerg, in Denmark, consisting of approximately 30 graves dating to the second half of the 10th century. The burials contained an unusually rich assemblage of grave goods, including coins, beads, ceramics, and a rare casket with gold-thread decoration, indicating the high social status of the individuals interred. Archaeologists suggest the cemetery belonged to a noble family associated with a nearby manor and possibly linked to the service of King Harald Bluetooth, reflecting a socially stratified community with ties to royal authority.

In August 2025, a rare Migration Period brooch was discovered by a metal detectorist in Kemi, Finnish Lapland, dating to approximately AD 475–550. The artefact, made of gilded bronze and richly decorated with stylised animal motifs including bird heads and a cervid, likely belonged to a high-status individual, possibly an elite woman, as such brooches were used as both garment fasteners and symbols of social identity.

In December 2025, archaeologists from Museum Vestsjælland discovered two iron lances with gold decoration at a sacred spring in Boeslunde, southwestern Zealand, Denmark, dating to approximately 900–830 BCE. The weapons, identified through AMS dating of organic material, are the earliest known iron artefacts in Denmark and predate the regional Iron Age by several centuries. Found in association with a ritual landscape rich in gold deposits including oath rings and spiral ornaments, the lances are interpreted as prestige objects deliberately deposited as offerings in a natural spring.

In December 2025, archaeologists discovered a previously unknown group of Stone Age rock paintings near Tingvoll in Møre og Romsdal, Norway. The paintings, created using pigment such as red ochre rather than carving, are estimated to date between 3,000 and 7,000 years ago and include motifs of fish likely salmon or halibut and geometric shapes interpreted as boats. The site was identified through digital image enhancement techniques.

In January 2026, archaeologists excavating in the medieval town of Tønsberg, Norway, uncovered a well-preserved gold ring dating to the High Middle Ages, likely between the 12th and 13th centuries. The ring, found just a few centimetres below the surface within a cultivated layer, features an oval blue setting, probably coloured glass, surrounded by intricate filigree and granulation, techniques associated with Byzantine and Carolingian goldsmithing traditions. Its small size and elaborate decoration suggest it belonged to a woman of high social status, while the symbolic value of blue stones in the medieval period believed to offer protection, healing, and moral virtue.

In March 2026, marine archaeologists identified a large man-made stone structure on the seabed in the Grindasundet strait near Øygarden, western Norway, interpreted as part of a medieval whale-trapping system dating to around 1,000 years ago. The formation, consisting of a deliberately arranged belt of stones over 25 meters long and associated with a nearby rock mound, was likely used to funnel whales into confined coastal areas where they could be captured. The discovery was made through sonar surveys and underwater investigations, revealing construction techniques involving the transport and placement of stones from boats. Historical sources have long described similar trapping systems using timber, ropes, and stone weights, but physical evidence had been lacking until now.

In March 2026, archaeologists in Skien, Norway, uncovered three well-presed 17th-century oak barrels containing slaked lime, a key material used in mortar production for urban construction. The barrels, preserved in stable underground conditions, provide direct evidence of how building materials were stored and managed in early modern towns.

In March 2026, a metal detectorist discovered a rare Nordic Iron Age gold foil figure, known as a gullgubbe, on a farm in Klepp Municipality, Rogaland, Norway, dating to approximately AD 550. The miniature artefact, measuring about 1 cm and made of thin gold foil, depicts a man and a woman and belongs to a class of objects widely interpreted as ritual or symbolic items. Such figures are typically associated with high-status sites, including large hall buildings that functioned as political and religious centres, and are thought to have been deposited as offerings during ceremonial activities.

In April 2026, archaeologists announced the discovery of a collection of Viking Age horse equipment from a burial ground at Sylta in Västmanland, Sweden. Excavations revealed more than 500 iron artefacts associated with equestrian gear, including spurs, bits, and decorated harness fittings, many of which were well preserved. Finding suggests that horses were cremated alongside their owners, often with elements of their harness still attached.

In April 2026, maritime archaeologists from the Danish Viking Ship Museum discovered the wreck of the Dannebroge, a Danish–Norwegian flagship that sank during the Battle of Copenhagen in 1801, in Copenhagen Harbour at a depth of around 15 meters. The vessel, which served as a central command ship in the Danish defensive line, was heavily damaged by British forces under Admiral Horatio Nelson, caught fire, and exploded during the battle. The wreck remained buried beneath layers of silt for over two centuries before being identified during surveys linked to the construction of the Lynetteholm artificial island. Artefacts such as cannonballs and structural remains, along with possible human remains, provide the direct archaeological evidence of the battle.

== Research and institutions ==
Archaeological research in Scandinavia is conducted by universities, museums, and heritage agencies. Major research institutions include:

● National Museum of Denmark

● Swedish National Heritage Board

● University of Oslo

== See also ==
- History of Scandinavia
- Archaeology of Denmark
- Archaeology of Northern Europe
