= Koelbjerg Man =

Mesolithic bog body found in Denmark

Coordinates: 55°24′13″N 10°07′59″E

- Born: c. 8050–8000 BC; Unknown
- Died: c. 8050–8000 BC; Near Koelbjerg, Funen, Denmark
- Body discovered: May 1941; Near Koelbjerg, Funen, Denmark
- Resting place: TID – Museum for Odense, Odense, Denmark
- Other name: Koelbjerg Woman (until 2017)
- Era: Maglemosian culture
- Known for: Oldest known bog body and oldest known human remains found in Denmark
- Height: 155 to 160 cm (5 ft 1 in to 5 ft 3 in)

The Koelbjerg Man (Danish: Koelbjergmanden), formerly known as the Koelbjerg Woman is the oldest known bog body and the oldest known human remains discovered in Denmark. Dating to approximately 8050–8000 BCE during the Maglemosian culture, he represents one of the earliest known inhabitants of Scandinavia after the end of the Last Glacial Period.

The disarticulated skeleton was discovered during peat cutting near Koelbjerg on the island of Funen in 1941. Initially identified as female on the basis of pelvic anatomy, the remains were widely known as the Koelbjerg Woman for more than 75 years. In 2017, renewed osteological study combined with ancient DNA analysis confirmed that the individual was male, prompting the name change to Koelbjerg Man.

Scientific study has shown that Koelbjerg Man was a young adult who stood about 155 to 160 centimetres (5 ft 1 in to 5 ft 3 in) tall and probably spent his life on Funen. His remains have provided important evidence for understanding the biology, mobility and environment of Mesolithic hunter-gatherers in northern Europe.

== Discovery ==
The individual who came to be known as Koelbjerg Man was discovered in May 1941 during peat cutting near Koelbjerg on the island of Funen (Fyn). On 21 May 1941, the discovery was reported to the Fyns Stiftsmuseum, whose staff excavated the site and carefully documented the scattered bones. Because many of the bones remained embedded in intact blocks of peat, archaeologists were able to reconstruct their original positions by matching the peat blocks to the holes from which they had been removed.

Rather than being found as a complete skeleton, Koelbjerg Man was recovered as scattered bones from different parts of the peat deposit. The skull and two bones were found at a depth of 2.5 metres (8 ft), while most of the remaining bones were recovered between 3 and 3.5 metres (10 and 11 ft), approximately 7 to 8 metres (23 to 26 ft) away. A thigh bone was found a further 2 metres (7 ft) to the southeast.

== Condition ==
Although Koelbjerg Man was recovered as disarticulated bones, much of the skeleton survived, including the skull, vertebrae, pelvis and bones from both the upper and lower limbs. Several skeletal elements were missing, and no soft tissue, skin, hair or clothing remained. Unlike many later European bog bodies, which retained soft tissues through natural mummification in peat, Koelbjerg Man is preserved almost entirely as skeletal remains.

Despite lying in the bog for more than 10,000 years, the bones were generally well preserved. The skull was especially important for later research, preserving pollen for pollen analysis and intact molars that yielded ancient DNA. The preservation of the skeleton also made it possible to conduct detailed osteological examination, radiocarbon dating and strontium isotope analysis, providing evidence about his age, biological sex and geographic origin.

== Scientific analysis ==
=== Body and health ===
Koelbjerg Man was a young adult when he died. In 1986, Danish anthropologist Pia Bennike estimated that he was about 25 years old and stood approximately 155 centimetres (5 ft 1 in) tall. A reassessment published in 2017 by archaeologist Jesper Hansen, biological anthropologist Hans Christian Petersen and their colleagues also placed him in his twenties.

Koelbjerg Man was relatively small and slender, but his skull was robust, with pronounced brow ridges, a sloping forehead and substantial areas where muscles attached to the bone. The walls of his skull were unusually thick, a characteristic also observed in other early Stone Age skeletons. His arm and leg bones were comparatively slender for a man of his period. These contrasting skeletal features contributed to the difficulty of determining his biological sex.

Eleven of his teeth survive. The 2017 researchers documented substantial deposits of dental calculus which may preserve further evidence of his diet. No particular foods were identified from the calculus in that study.

=== Sex identification ===
When Koelbjerg Man's remains were first examined after their discovery on the Danish island of Funen in 1941, the skeleton was identified as female. The identification was based mainly on the shape of the pelvis, which at the time was considered the most reliable part of the skeleton for determining biological sex. The remains became known as Koelbjerg Woman and retained that name for more than 75 years.

Later examinations produced different results. Although the pelvis had features associated with a female skeleton, the skull and the long bones of the arms and legs were more robust and had proportions associated with a male skeleton.

In 2017, Hansen, Petersen and their colleagues re-examined the remains. They combined a new study of the skeleton with ancient DNA analysis. DNA extracted from an intact molar identified the individual as male. The remains were subsequently renamed Koelbjerg Man.

=== Dating ===
In July 1941, pollen preserved inside the skull was analysed to estimate the age of the surrounding peat deposits. A geological bore sample collected in October 1943 provided further evidence about the ancient environment, and radiocarbon dating confirmed in 1983 placed Koelbjerg Man between about 8050 and 8000 BCE, during the Maglemosian culture.

=== Genetic ancestry ===
In 2017, geneticist Morten E. Allentoft and his colleagues analysed ancient DNA recovered from one of Koelbjerg Man's molars. They identified his mitochondrial DNA as belonging to haplogroup U5a2c, a genetic lineage passed from mothers to their children. Variants of haplogroup U5 were common among European hunter-gatherers during the Mesolithic, approximately 10,000 years ago. The same U5a2c lineage had been identified in another Mesolithic individual from Felsdach Inzigkofen in southern Germany.

Koelbjerg Man's maternal lineage was consistent with those found among other European Mesolithic populations. However, mitochondrial DNA traces only one line of ancestry. The researchers noted that further analysis of his nuclear DNA, which is inherited from both parents, would be needed to investigate his broader genetic ancestry.

His mitochondrial DNA sequence was deposited in GenBank, an international database of genetic information, under accession number MF992925.

=== Origins ===
Koelbjerg Man probably grew up on Funen, the Danish island where his remains were discovered in 1941. In 2016, archaeologist and isotope specialist Karin Margarita Frei examined enamel from one of his first molars to investigate where he had lived during early childhood. The enamel fragment had already broken away from the tooth, allowing researchers to analyse it without taking another sample from the skeleton.

Tooth enamel preserves a chemical record of the environment in which it formed. Koelbjerg Man's first molar developed during early childhood, up to approximately three or four years of age. Frei measured its strontium isotope ratio, which reflects the geology of the region where a person obtained food and water during that period.

The result, 0.71005, fell within the range established for Denmark. Hansen and his colleagues concluded that Koelbjerg Man most likely grew up locally. However, they noted that parts of Great Britain and northern Germany have similar strontium isotope signatures, so these alternative origins could not be excluded.

=== Diet ===
Researchers have used chemical analysis of Koelbjerg Man's bones to investigate what he ate. In 1986, Danish physicist Henrik Tauber analysed carbon isotopes in collagen from Koelbjerg Man's left thigh bone. He measured a carbon-13 value of −20.7‰, which indicated that most of Koelbjerg Man's food came from plants and animals that lived on land. Because bone collagen changes slowly during life, Tauber estimated that the result reflected about five to ten years of Koelbjerg Man's diet.

Seventeen years later, in 2003, Danish archaeologist Anders Fischer obtained new samples from the skeleton for further dietary analysis. Isotope specialist Mike Richards of the University of Bradford analysed carbon and nitrogen isotopes in the samples. Fischer and his colleagues reported in 2007 that the results again indicated a diet based mainly on food from the land, with aquatic foods, including marine foods, making little or no contribution.

The isotope evidence identifies broad sources of food rather than individual species. Tauber noted that freshwater fish could not be excluded from his carbon-isotope results because their chemical signatures can resemble those of animals that live on land. The analysis therefore does not establish which particular plants or animals Koelbjerg Man ate.

== Cause of death ==
Koelbjerg Man's cause of death is unknown. Petersen found no injuries on the surviving bones that could be identified as the cause of death. Examination of the skeleton also found no evidence of disease that explained how he died.

At the time of Koelbjerg Man's death, about 10,000 years ago, the find site on Funen was a shallow lake rather than a bog. When the remains were excavated in 1941, his bones were found scattered through the former lake deposits, with some lying as much as 10 metres (33 ft) apart.

In 1943, archaeologist Johannes Troels-Smith interpreted the distribution of the bones as evidence that Koelbjerg Man's body had floated in the lake while it decomposed. He proposed that parts of the body separated and sank at different times.

More than 70 years later, in 2017, Hansen and his colleagues reconsidered Troels-Smith's interpretation using modern forensic research on the decomposition of bodies in water. They considered his explanation very likely and suggested that the body probably entered the lake during the warmer months, when gases produced during decomposition could have caused it to rise to the surface and float.

Drowning has been proposed as an explanation for Koelbjerg Man's presence in the lake, but there is no evidence establishing whether he drowned or entered the water after death.

== Exhibition ==
In 1972–1973, Koelbjerg Man's skull was loaned to the National Museum of Denmark in Copenhagen for a new exhibition on Danish prehistory, where he was presented as the oldest known person from Denmark. The skull returned to the Fyns Stiftsmuseum in 1979 and was replaced at the National Museum by a cast.

In August 2013, Koelbjerg Man became the opening exhibit in Fyn – midt i verden ("Funen – Centre of the World"), a permanent exhibition at Møntergården in Odense. The exhibition presents the history of Funen and Odense from Koelbjerg Man, who lived more than 10,000 years ago, to the modern city.

When the museum was renamed TID – Museum for Odense on 1 June 2024, Koelbjerg Man remained on display as the oldest known person found in Denmark.

== See also ==
- List of Danish bog bodies

== Bibliography ==
- K. Brøste, K. Fischer-Møller (1943). Geologisk Datering af Koelbjerg-Skelettet (in Danish).
- J. Troels-Smith (1943). Geologisk Datering af Koelbjerg-Skelettet (in Danish).
