= Møntergården =

Cultural history museum in Odense, Denmark

Coordinates: 55.397942°N 10.393994°E

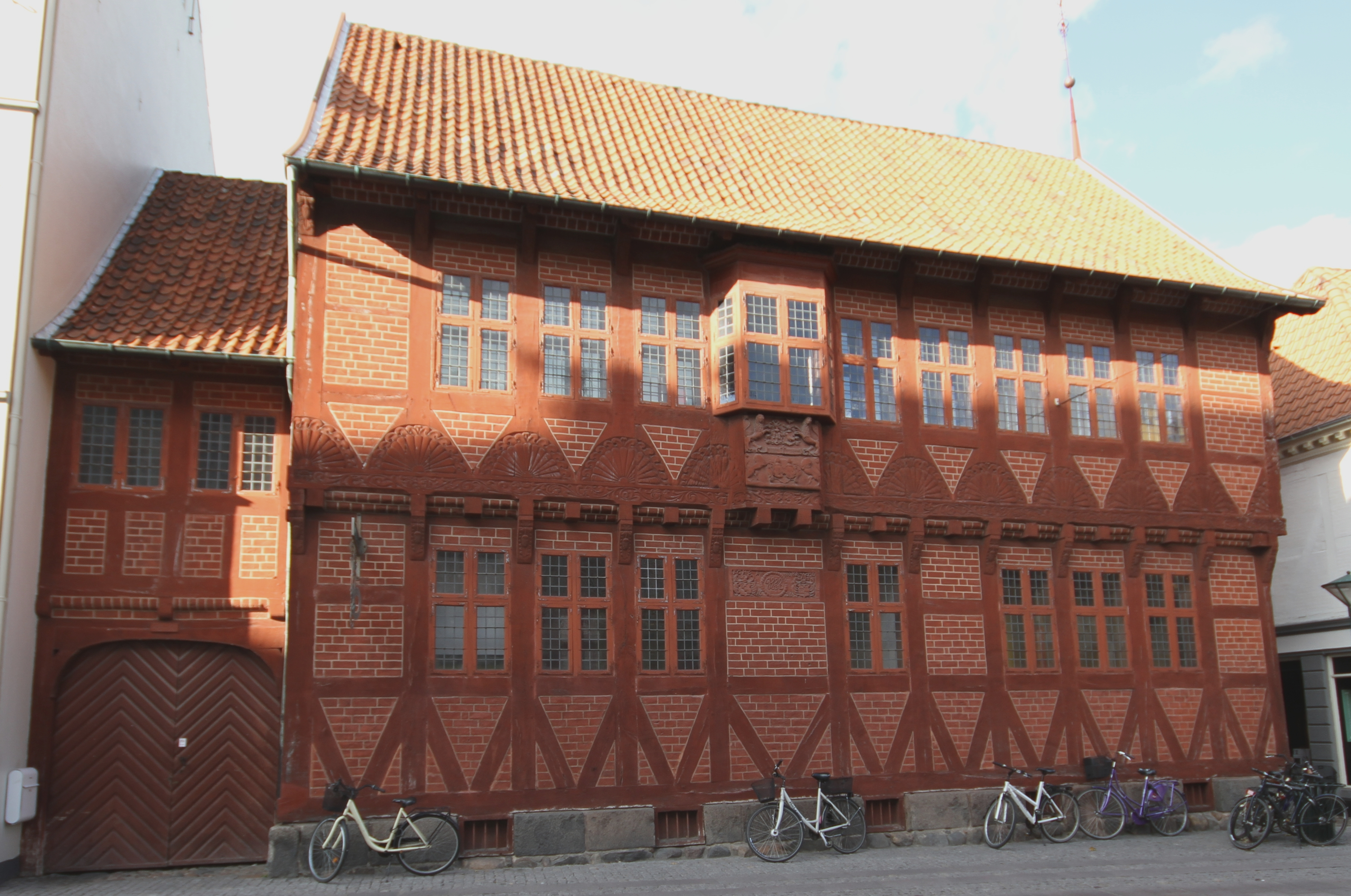
Møntergården

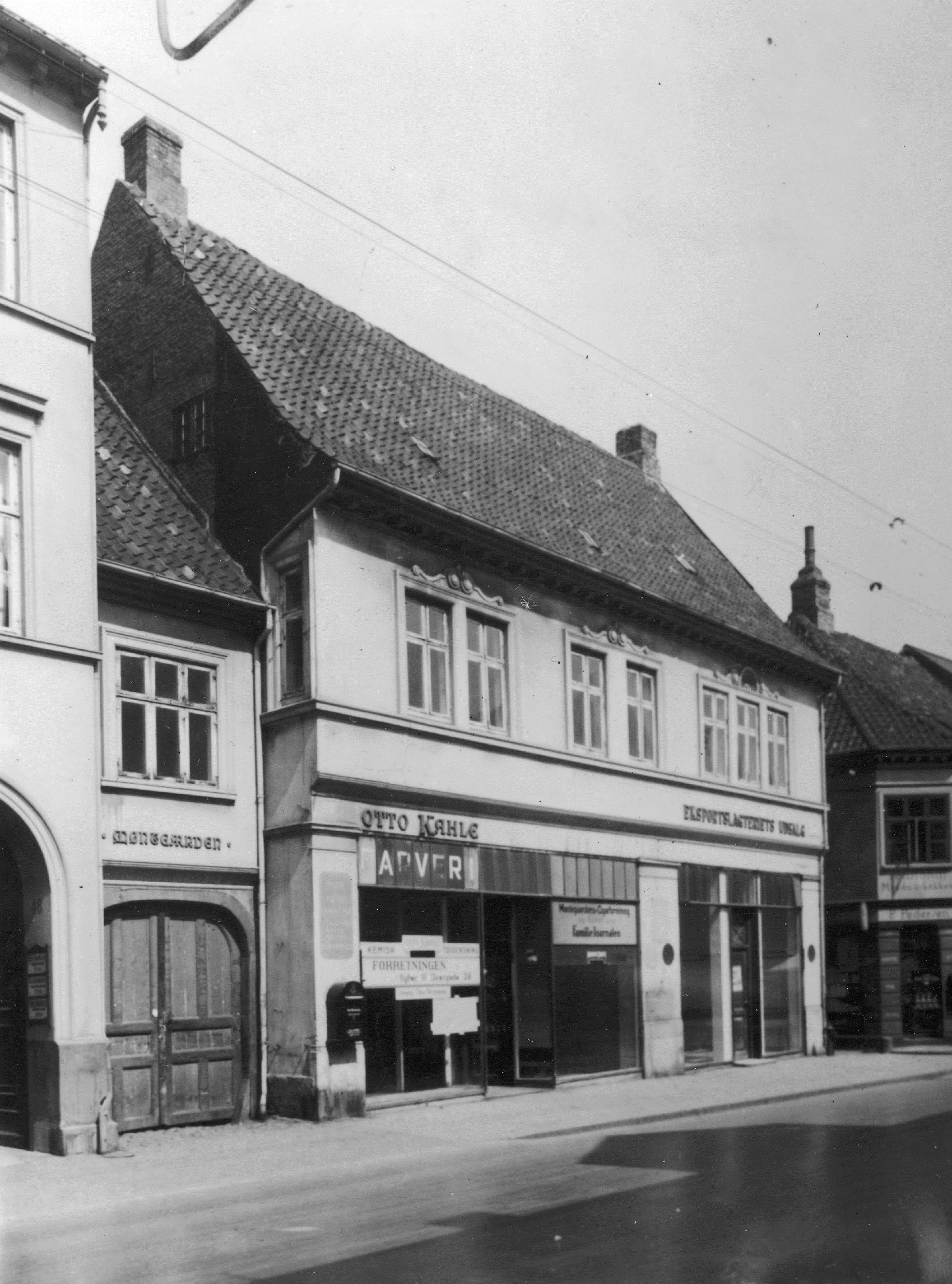
Møntergården in 1939, before the restoration of Renaissance facade.

Møntergården is the cultural history museum in Odense, Denmark. It is located at Overgade 48 in a courtyard of half-timbered houses in the Renaissance style.

== History ==
The building was built on a farm owned by the nobleman Falk Gøye (1602–1653). Dating to 1646, the two storey building's exterior features carved rosettes. For several years, various noble families lived on the farm. In the middle of the 18th century the farm was transformed into a grocery store and a storage room. In 1860, the lower floor of the front porch was furnished for shops and several families moved into apartments above.

In 1930, Odense Municipality bought the building to preserve it. At that time the lower floor was reconstructed and the buildings came to resemble themselves in the 1646 version. In 1941, Møntergården opened its doors as a museum for the first time. From 2010 to 2013, a major expansion occurred with funding from the foundation A.P. Møller og Hustru Chastine Mc-Kinney Møllers Fond.

The museum has exhibits on Funen's ancient history, as well as Odense in the Middle Ages and the period of the Renaissance. Among the displays is the Koelbjerg Man (Koelbjergmanden), who lived around 8000 BC and are the oldest human remains known from Denmark.
