= Archaeology of Denmark =

The archaeology of Denmark presents an extraordinary rich and varied abundance of archaeological artifacts, exceptionally preserved by the climate and natural conditions in Denmark proper – including boglands, shallow waters, a cold and relatively unvarying climate.

At the same time, archaeological study in Denmark has continually and fundamentally influenced the young science of archaeology from its very beginnings. The Danefæ law, according to which valuable objects discovered in Denmark are property of the state, which is obligated to compensate the finders of the objects, has encouraged a culture of amateur metal detecting and led to many important finds.

== History and excavations ==
The prehistory of Denmark (Jutland) reveals that (following earlier Clactonian relics) many different cultures were to settle there and leave archaeological footprints since the end of the last ice age. Their discovery parallels the ongoing evolution of Danish archaeology itself, which began in the early nineteenth century with the establishment of the National Museum of Denmark, organised by Christian Thomsen. It was he who introduced the three-age system – Stone, Bronze and Iron Ages - to European archaeology, thus for the first time differentiating pre-history into distinct time-scales.

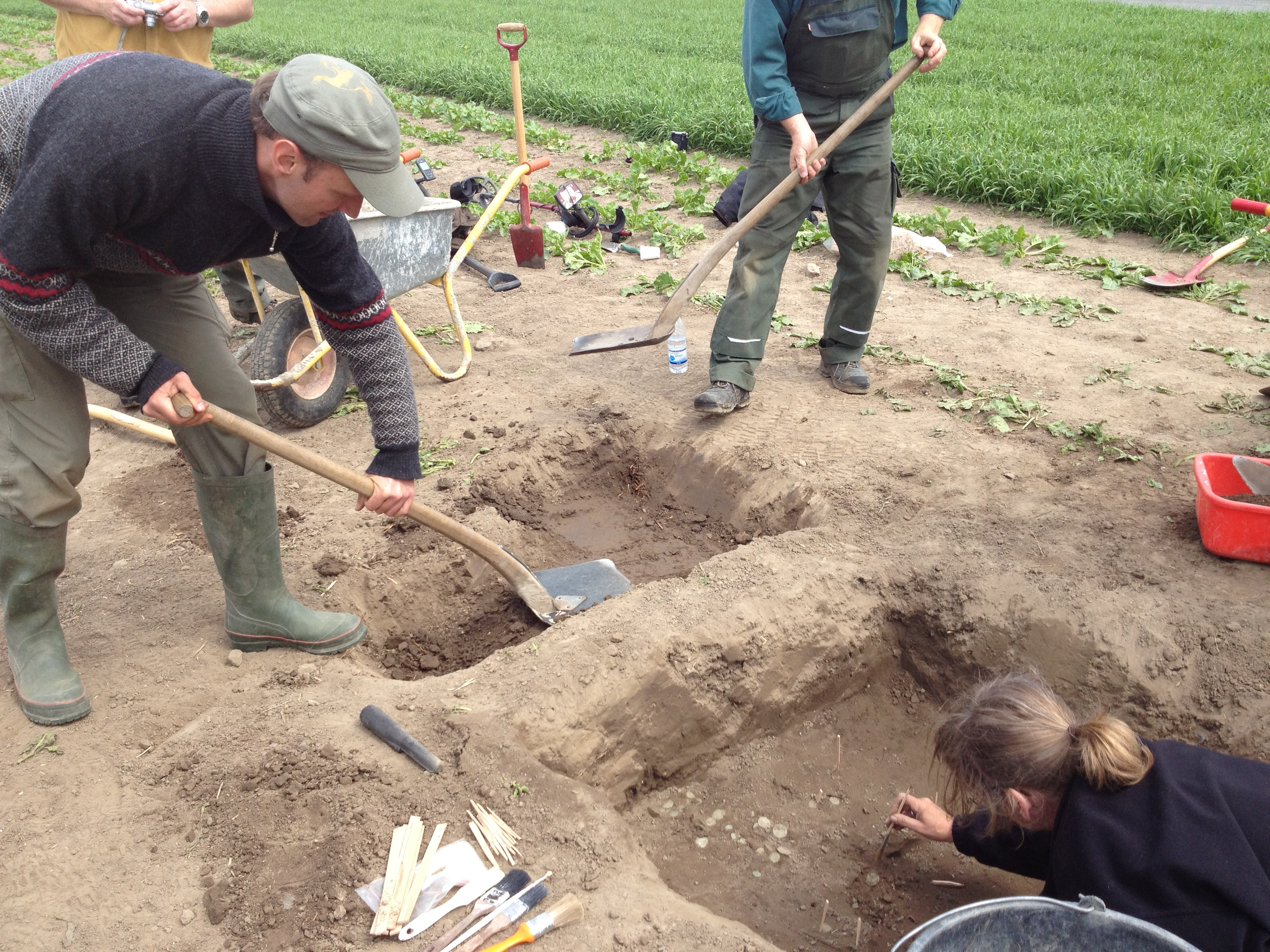
A treasure of medieval coins is being uncovered at the island of Møn.

Jens Jacob Asmussen Worsaae, one of Thomsen's early assistants, set out in 1850 to investigate an interesting find of flint tools linked to a heap of ancient oyster shells at Meilgaard in Northern Djursland. Worsaae surmised that perhaps “this had been a sort of eating-place for the people of the neighborhood in the earliest prehistoric times”; and further excavations indeed confirmed that the ancient shell heaps were signs of human prehistoric activity, being kitchen middens - Danish term køkkenmødding - and leftovers from their meals. A later commission initiated in 1893–1895, executed a large scale, thorough and interdisciplinary excavation at the Limfjord. The site is named Ertebølle and so the rich and defining archaeological find coined the now well-known Stone Age culture of Ertebølle. Apart from archaeology, participating scientific disciplines included botany, zoology and geology, and such kitchen middens has since been viewed as important archaeological sites internationally. Due to land-shift after the melting of the ice, many kitchen midden sites, originally on the coast, were later submerged: The first submerged settlement excavated in Denmark was Tybrind Vig in 1977. The site was excavated over the following decade. 300 m from the shore and 3 m below the surface, divers excavated sensationally well-preserved artefacts from the Ertebølle Culture.

The kitchen midden culture stretched chronologically from c.5000 BC onward. Its immediate predecessor was the Mesolithic culture of Maglemose, first uncovered in a Zealand bog in 1900; while from c. 2500 BC the midden culture would gradually come under the influence of the newly arrived neolithic farmer. Later Neolithic arrivals included the Corded Ware culture, whose round barrows scattered the Danish landscape, each including a stone battleaxe: the gradual replacement of these latter by bronze versions over time marked Danish entry into the Bronze Age.

A complex web of trading roots now linked Jutland with the remainder of Bronze-Age Europe. An overland route carried Jutland amber to Mycenaean Greece, while sea-routes also brought it to England, and the Mediterranean.

The Iron Age came relatively late to Denmark, but again the bogs yielded an exciting and dramatic find, Tollund Man. The well-preserved body of a hanged man created intense interest; it was associated by some with the accounts by Tacitus of sacrifices made to the goddess Nerthus. Runes based on the Latin alphabet began to appear, and Roman imports among grave goods also show the increasing influence of the nearby empire by the first centuries AD. For subsequent periods, Danish archaeology has worked alongside, instead of independently of, the historical record, exploring for example the conflicts of the Jutes and the Danes echoed in Beowulf, or the roads, buildings, and runic inscriptions behind the later Viking kingdom.

== Notable archaeologists of Denmark ==
Name	Born	Died	Achievements
Christian Jürgensen Thomsen	1788	1865	Introduced the universal three-age system
Jens Jacob Asmussen Worsaae	1821	1885	Played a key role in the foundation of archaeology as a science. Pioneered paleobotany and archaeological stratigraphy (in relation to the three-age system).
Sophus Müller	1846	1934	
Georg F.L. Sarauw	1862	1928	Pioneered fossilized pollen studies and discovered the Maglemosian culture.
Peter Glob	1911	1985	Internationally recognized writer and mediator of archaeology. Internationally known for his excavations and investigations of bog bodies. Led several large scale archaeological expeditions to the Middle East.

== Continuing Danish influence ==
Denmark and Danish scientists played an important role in establishing archaeology as a science in the 1800s, and continue to contribute with fundamental methods and discoveries to this science in general. Denmark and Danish archaeologists has a long history of both international collaborations and engagements and public outreach, education and mediation of the results of archaeology. Many Danish museums plays a leading role in public outreach and mediation.

== Literary overlaps ==
- Seamus Heaney in his poetry made Tollund Man a powerful symbol for helping to understand present-day violence.
- J. R. R. Tolkien based his description of Beorn's Hall in The Hobbit on archaeological reconstructions of an old Danish mead-hall.

== See also ==
- Heorot
- Jutland beaker culture
- Megalith tombs
- Nordic Stone Age
- Ship burial

== Notes and references ==
- T. Douglas Price. "What Danish Archaeology Means to Me". Danske Museer [Danish Museums]. The Museums Service. Archived from the original on 3 November 2014.

== Sources ==
- ICOM Denmark: The Danish ICOM Committee Official homepage of the Danish national committee of ICOM (International Council Of Museums) in English.
- "Danske Museer - Denmarks Museum Journal". Danish Museums. The Museums Service. Archived from the original on 6 February 2015. Official English homepage of the Danish archaeological journal "Danske Museer".
- Nordisk Museologi: The Nordisk Museologi journal. Official homepage of the "Nordisk Museologi" (Nordic Museology) journal in English.
