= Nøstvet and Lihult cultures =

Two similar Mesolithic cultures in Scandinavian prehistory

- Geographical range: Scandinavia
- Period: Mesolithic
- Dates: c. 6200 BC – c. 3200 BC
- Preceded by: Fosna–Hensbacka culture
- Followed by: Funnelbeaker culture Pitted-ware culture

The Nøstvet culture (c. 6200 BC – 3200 BC) and the Lihult culture are two very similar Mesolithic cultures in Scandinavian prehistory, derived from the earlier Fosna-Hensbacka cultures. They are so varied and vaguely defined that they are rather a tradition than an archaeological culture.

The Nøstvet culture appeared around the Oslofjord and southeastern Norway, extending along the Skagerrak coast, whereas the Lihult culture is found in western coastal Sweden. The Sandarna culture is generally regarded as a distinct Mesolithic culture (or phase) between the Hensbacka and Lihult cultures. This name comes from a settlement near Gothenburg, dated approximately to 7000–6000 BC

The Nøstvet people lived in open settlement. They used honed axes and microliths of various rocks, such as quartz, quartzite and flint. They lived primarily of hunting various animals such as seafowl and marine mammals, in addition to fishing and gathering. The size of the settlements increased over time, which may reflect population growth and a more sedentary lifestyle.

In southern Scandinavia, its neighbours were first the Kongemose culture (roughly 6000 BC–5200 BC) and later on the Ertebølle culture (about 5200 BC–4000 BC).

About 4000 BC, the Nøstvet and Lihult cultures were succeeded by the Funnelbeaker culture and disappeared from the archaeological record.
