= Kongemose culture =

Mesolithic hunter-gatherer culture in southern Scandinavia

- Geographical range: Europe
- Period: Mesolithic Europe
- Dates: circa 6,000 B.C.E. — circa 5,200 B.C.E.
- Preceded by: Maglemosian culture
- Followed by: Ertebølle culture

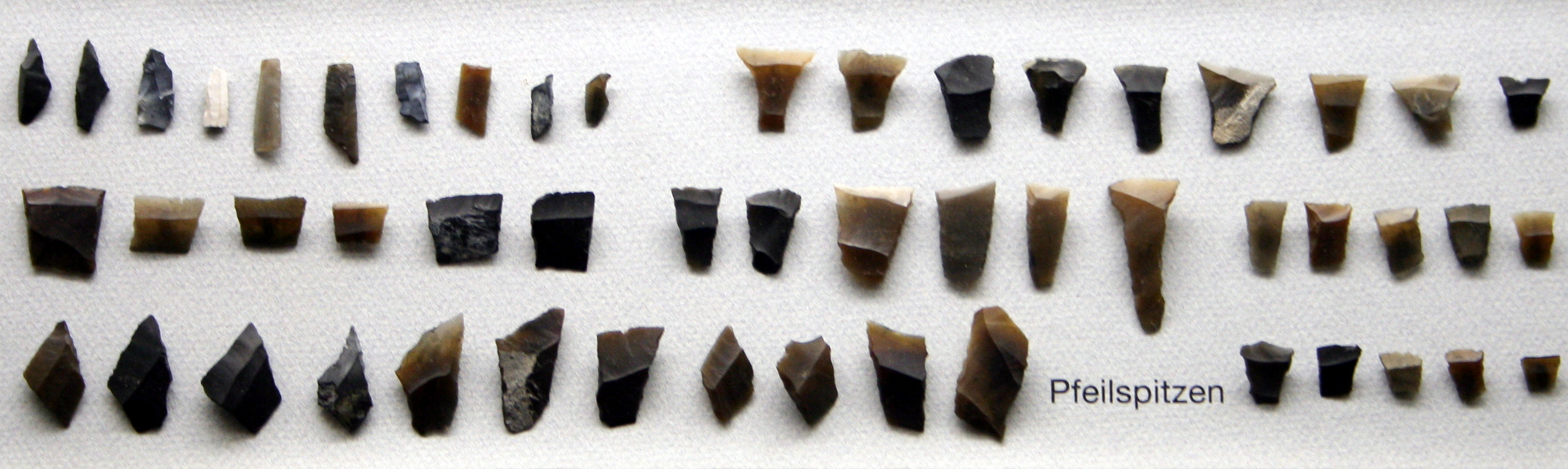
Kongemose culture

The Kongemose culture (Kongemosekulturen) was a Mesolithic hunter-gatherer culture in southern Scandinavia ca. 6000 BC–5200 BC and the origin of the Ertebølle culture. It was preceded by the Maglemosian culture. In the north it bordered on the Scandinavian Nøstvet and Lihult cultures.

The Kongemose culture is named after a location in western Zealand and its typical form is known from Denmark and Skåne. The finds are characterised by long flintstone flakes, used for making characteristic rhombic arrowheads, scrapers, drills, awls, and toothed blades. Tiny micro blades constituted the edges of bone daggers that were often decorated with geometric patterns. Stone axes were made of a variety of stones, and other tools were made of horn and bone. The main economy was based on hunting red deer, roe deer, and wild boar, supplemented by fishing at the coastal settlements.

== Name origin ==
In the summer of 1952, during a series of drainage schemes that were being carried out in Kongemose, a portion of the Aamose area in West Zealand, a number of prehistoric findings came to light. The site was filled in again, but a year later other portions of the settlement were found in the nearby area while ploughing.

An excavation then started in 1954 to rescue the site, and after a rough procedure that lasted a year due to persistently bad weather, a 1.200 square meters settlement was unearthed. It shares similar objects with the "Early Coast Culture" of the nearby area, but it also presents some unique findings, such as a large flint pick and a bull-roarer, an ancient musical instrument mainly used for rituals.

The conducted pollen analysis dates the Kongemose site to a period broadly corresponding to Pollen Zone VI (ca. 7700 - 5500 BC).

== Other sources ==
- Clark, Grahame (2009) The Earlier Stone Age Settlement of Scandinavia (Cambridge University Press) ISBN 978-0-521-10767-9
- Kuml - Årbog for Jysk Arkæologisk Selskab, 1956https://tidsskrift.dk/kuml/article/view/97286/0
