= Maglemosian culture =

Culture of Early Mesolithic Period in Northern Europe

- Geographical range: Europe
- Period: Mesolithic Europe
- Dates: c. 9000 – c. 6000 BC
- Preceded by: Ahrensburgian; Fosna–Hensbacka culture Swiderian culture
- Followed by: Kongemose culture

Maglemosian (c. 9000 BC – c. 6000 BC) is the name given to a culture of the early Mesolithic period in Northern Europe. In Scandinavia, the culture was succeeded by the Kongemose culture.

== Environment and location ==
The name originates from the Danish archaeological site Maglemose, situated near Gørlev and Høng on western Zealand, southwest of lake Tissø. Here the first settlement of the culture was excavated in 1900, by George Sarauw.

When the Maglemosian culture flourished, sea levels were much lower than now and what is now mainland Europe and Scandinavia were linked with Britain through the region known as Doggerland, now submerged beneath the North Sea. The cultural period overlaps the end of the last ice age.

== Characteristics ==
The Maglemosian people lived in forest and wetland environments, using fishing and hunting tools made from wood, bone, and flint microliths. It appears that they had domesticated the dog. Some may have lived settled lives, but most were nomadic, though it is speculated that single families sometimes built seasonal huts to hunt.

Huts made of bark have been preserved, in addition to tools made of flint, bone, and horn. A characteristic feature of the culture is the sharply edged microliths of flintstone, used for spear and arrow heads. Another notable feature is the leister, a characteristic type of fishing spear, used for gigging.

== Scandinavian data table ==
Era	Timespan	Climatic period	Plantgrowth	Mammal game	Bird game	Locale type
Early Maglemosian culture	9,000 BC – 7,800 BC	Preboreal Epoch	Birch-pine era	aurochs, bison, elk, wild horse	crane, lapwing	
Middle Maglemosian culture	7,800 BC – 7,000 BC	Boreal Epoch	Hazel-pine era	aurochs, red deer, roe deer, wild boar, lynx, fox, polecat, badger, wildcat	merganser, grebe, coot, heron, crane, lapwing	Klosterlund
Late Maglemosian culture	7,000 BC – 6,400 BC	Atlantic Epoch	Later linden era	aurochs, red deer, roe deer, wild boar, lynx, fox, polecat, badger, wildcat	merganser, grebe, coot, heron, crane, lapwing	

== See also ==
- Ahrensburg culture
- Deepcar
- Doggerland
- Koelbjerg Man
- Last Glacial Period
- Georg F.L. Sarauw
- Star Carr
- Thatcham

== Sources ==
- Anders Fischer: "Submerged Stone Age – Danish Examples and North sea potential"; i: N.C.Flemming: Submarine Prehistory and Archaeology of the North Sea: research priorities and collaboration with industry. CBA Research Report 141, 2004, s. 23ff

Danish-language texts

- Geoffrey Bibby: Spadens vidnedsbyrd; Wormanium 1980, ISBN 87-8516-071-7 s. 109f
- Gyldendal og Politikens Danmarkshistorie (red. af Olaf Olsen); Bind 1: I begyndelsen. Fra de ældste tider til ca. år 200 f.Kr. (ved Jørgen Jensen); 1988, s. 47ff
- Jørgen Jensen: Danmarks Oldtid. Stenalder, 13.000–2.000 f.Kr.; Gyldendal 2001, ISBN 87-00-49038-5 s. 86ff
- Anders Fischer: "En håndfuld flint", Skalk nr. 5, 1973, s. 8ff
- Anders Fischer: "Mennesket og havet i ældre stenalder"; i: Carin Bunte (red): Arkeologi och Naturvetenskab, Lund 2005, s. 276ff
- Kim Aaris-Sørensen: "Uroksejagt", Skalk nr. 6, 1984, s. 10ff
- Ole Grøn: "Teltning", Skalk nr. 1, 1988, s. 13f
- Søren A. Sørensen: "Hytte ved sø", Skalk nr. 3, 1988, s. 25ff
- Peter Vang Petersen: "Bjørnejagt", Skalk nr. 5, 1991, s. 3ff
- Poul og Kristian Krabbe: "Vest for Valhal", Skalk nr. 6, 1995, s. 11ff
- Axel Degn Johansen: "Ikke en sky og ikke en vind!", Skalk nr 2, 2008, s. 8ff
