= Ertebølle culture =

Archaeological culture

- Geographical range: Europe
- Period: Mesolithic Europe
- Dates: c. 5,400 BCE – c. 3,950 BCE
- Preceded by: Kongemose culture
- Followed by: Funnelbeaker culture

The Ertebølle culture (c. 5,400 BCE – 3,950 BCE) (Danish pronunciation: [ˈɛɐ̯təˌpølə]) is a hunter-gatherer and fisher, pottery-making culture dating to the end of the Mesolithic period. The culture was concentrated in Southern Scandinavia. It is named after the type site, a location in the small village of Ertebølle on Limfjorden in Danish Jutland. In the 1890s the National Museum of Denmark excavated heaps of oyster shells there, mixed with mussels, snails, bones, and artefacts of bone, antler, and flint, which were evaluated as kitchen middens (Danish køkkenmødding), or refuse dumps. Accordingly, the culture is less-commonly named the Kitchen Midden. As it is approximately identical to the Ellerbek culture of Schleswig-Holstein, the combined name, Ertebølle-Ellerbek is often used. The Ellerbek culture (German Ellerbek-Kultur) is named after a type site in Ellerbek, a community on the edge of Kiel, Germany.

In the 1960s and 1970s another closely related culture was found in the (now dry) Noordoostpolder in the Netherlands, near the village Swifterbant and the former island of Urk. Named the Swifterbant culture (5,300 – 3,400 BCE) they show a transition from hunter-gatherer to both animal husbandry, primarily cows and pigs, and cultivation of barley and emmer wheat. During the formative stages contact with nearby Linear Pottery culture settlements in Limburg has been detected. Like the Ertebølle culture, they lived near open water, in this case creeks, riverdunes, and bogs along post-glacial banks of the Overijsselse Vechte. Recent excavations including the "Trijntje" skeleton show a local continuity going back to (at least) 5,600 BCE, when burial practices resembled the contemporary gravefields in Denmark and South Sweden "in all details", suggesting only part of a diverse ancestral "Ertebølle"-like heritage was locally continued into the later (Middle Neolithic) Swifterbant tradition (4,200 – 3,400 BCE).

The Ertebølle culture was roughly contemporaneous with the Linear Pottery culture, food-producers whose northernmost border was located just to the south. The Ertebølle did not practice agriculture but it did use domestic grain in some capacity, which they must have obtained from the south.

The Ertebølle culture replaced the earlier Kongemose culture of Denmark. It was limited to the north by the Scandinavian Nøstvet and Lihult cultures. It is divided into an early phase c. 5,400 BCE – c. 4,500 BCE, and a later phase c. 4,500 BCE – 3,950 BCE. Shortly after 4,100 BCE the Ertebølle began to expand along the Baltic coast at least as far as Rügen. Shortly thereafter it was replaced by the Funnelbeaker culture.

In recent years archaeologists have found the acronym EBK most convenient, parallel to LBK for German Linearbandkeramik (Linear Pottery culture) and TRB for German Trichterbecher, Danish Tragtbæger (Funnelbeaker culture), and Dutch trechterbekercultuur. Ostensibly for Ertebølle Kultur, EBK could be either German or Danish, and has the added advantage that Ellerbek also begins with E.

== Description ==
=== Environment ===
The Ertebølle culture falls within the Atlantic climate period and the Littorina Sea phase of the Baltic Sea basin; that is, climate was warmer and moister than today, deciduous forests covered Europe, and the Baltic was at higher levels than today, and was a salt sea, rather than a brackish one or a lake. The Baltic coastline was often flooded to a level of 5m-6m higher than now. Jutland was an archipelago. Marshes were extensive, with tracts of shallow water rich in fish. The environment itself thus invited settlement.

The Ertebølle population settled on promontories, near or on beaches, on islands, and along rivers and estuaries away from the dense forests. The environment most like the then range of the Ertebølle is the Wadden Sea region of the North Sea from the Netherlands to Denmark. Due to chance fluctuations in the sea level during Ertebølle occupation of the coast and subsequently, many of the culture sites are currently under 3m-4m of water. Some have been excavated by underwater archaeology. The artifacts are in an excellent state of preservation, having been protected by anaerobic mud. On the disadvantage side, water movements have disrupted many sites.

=== Cultural remains ===
The Ertebølle population derived its living from a variety of means, but chiefly from the sea. They prospered, grew healthy and multiplied on a diet of fish. They were masters of the inland waters, which they traversed in paddled dugouts. Like many peoples known in history, they were able to hunt whales and seals from their dugouts. Their materials were mainly wood, with bone, antler and flint for functions requiring harder surfaces. Homes were constructed of brush or light wood. The materials encourage us to view them as transitory. They were, nevertheless, able to place the dead in longer-used cemeteries. Perhaps the dwelling-places were transitory, but the territories were not.

=== Physical anthropology ===
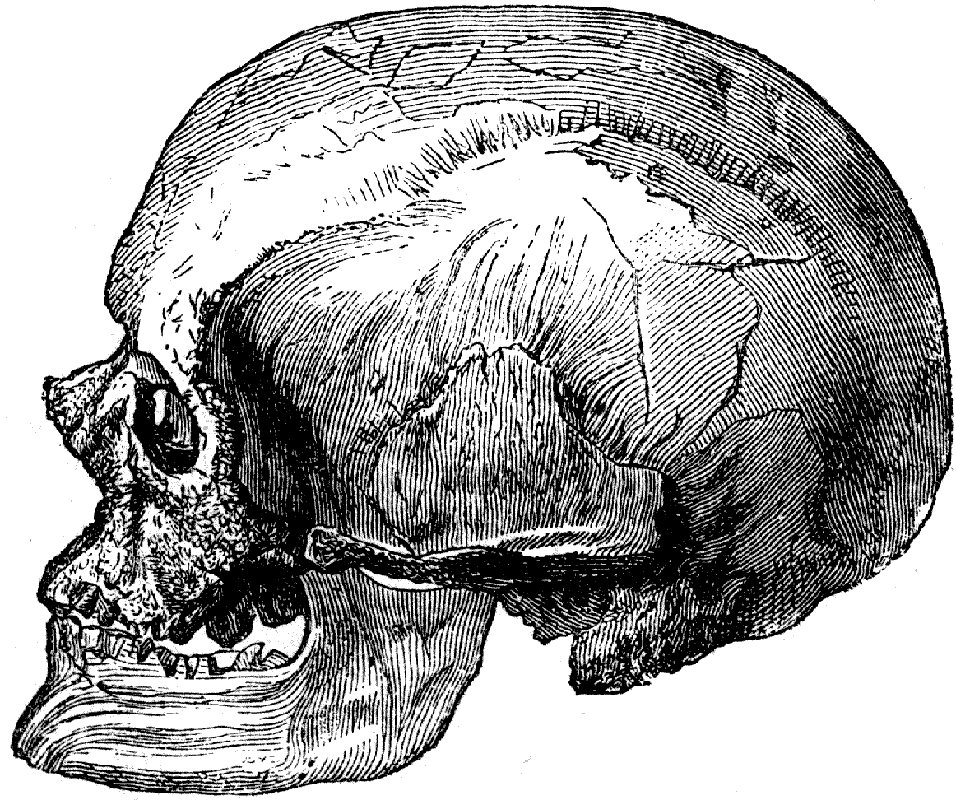
Cro-Magnon skull

Skeletal remains are relatively meagre. They have been studied and described in great detail from an anthropometric, or "man-measuring", point of view. Without resorting to this specialised language, the main conclusions are as follows. On the one hand they did not differ from the current inhabitants of Denmark in skeleton. Soft tissue features, being known through reconstruction only, leave some room for variation.

On the other hand, many skulls evidence facial features or dimensions of Cro-Magnons. The latter type prevailed in Late Paleolithic times in Europe, supplanting Neanderthal man there. Genetic analysis by scientists from the University of Ferrara (Italy) indicates that the Cro-Magnons were ancestral to the current population of Europe.

Two hypotheses concerning the origin of the Ertebølle population are therefore possible and have been proposed. One is that in the remains we are seeing an intermediate phase in the evolution of the population of Scania. The second is that the Ertebølle population was an admixture of agrarian southerners with indigenous Scanians over a permeable border. Both views are supported by the evidence.

=== Evidence of conflict ===
There is some evidence of conflict between Ertebølle settlements: an arrowhead in a pelvis at Skateholm, Sweden; a bone point in a throat at Vedbæk, Zealand; a bone point in the chest at Stora Biers, Sweden. More significant is evidence of cannibalism at Dyrholmen, Jutland, and Møllegabet on Ærø. There human bones were broken open to obtain the marrow. The evidence of marrow exploitation in the Ertebølle remains indicates dietary rather than ritual cannibalism.

=== Similar cultures ===
The Ertebølle culture is of a general type called Late Mesolithic, of which other examples can be found in Swifterbant culture, Zedmar culture, Narva culture and in Russia. Some would include the Nøstvet culture and Lihult culture to the north as well. The various locations seem fragmented and isolated, but that characteristic may be an accident of discovery. Perhaps if all the submarine sites were known, a continuous coastal culture would appear from the Netherlands to the lakes of Russia, but this has yet to be demonstrated.

== Economy ==
Ertebølle peoples lived primarily on seafood.

=== Fishing industry ===
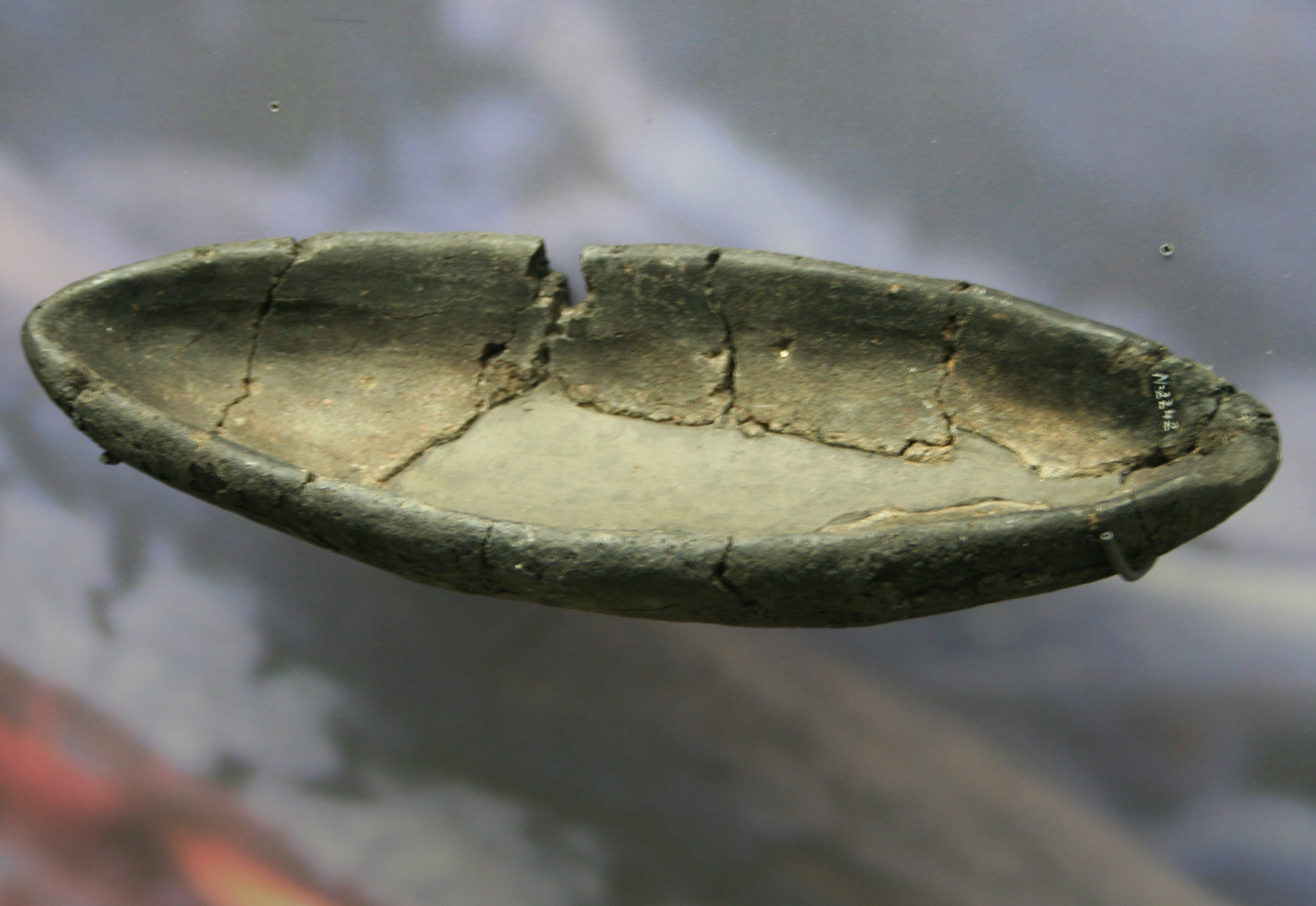
'Blubber lamp'. Possibly fueled by whale or seal oil

The mainstay of Ertebølle economy was fish. Three main methods of fishing are supported by the evidence, such as the boats and other equipment found in fragmentary form at Tybrind Vig and elsewhere: trapping, angling, and spearing.

To trap fish, the fishermen constructed fish fences, or weirs, of approximately 4m-long hazel sticks set upright in the mud at the bottom of shallow water. The fish must have been corralled by some method and then harvested at will. Wickerwork traps were also used.

Ertebølle fishermen angled with hooks made of red deer bone, of which at least one example has been found with line attached. They spear-fished with spears made of shafts to which hazel tines were attached. Boats were dugouts a few feet wide propelled by paddles constructed of shafts to which leaf-shaped or heart-shaped blades were attached. At one end a layer of clay spread on the bottom supported hot coals, an indispensable source of heat if you were going to spend much time in the boat.

Dozens of species of fish have been found in the middens. Some of the most common are pike, whitefish, cod, and ling at Østenkaer, anchovy (Engraulis encrasicolus), three-spined stickleback (Gasterosteus aculeatus) and eel at Krabbesholm. The oldest site, Yderhede, featured remains of flatfish and sharks: porbeagle, topeshark, smoothhound, and (at Lystrup Enge) spurdog. At Egsminde herring, cyprinids and European perch were found. The presence of deep-sea fish and sharks probably indicates the Ertebølle fishermen often ventured out on deep water. Whether they did so in their marshland dugouts or also owned larger, ocean-going ones is an answer that waits for more evidence.

=== Whaling and sealing industry ===
At Lystrup Enge, Yderhede and other places the bones of cetaceans and pinnipeds have been found; specifically, of killer whales, the white-beaked dolphin, and the bottlenose dolphin among the cetaceans. These are not animals requiring whaling voyages on the high seas. They could have been washed onto the shore or hunted in shallow waters.

The seals are the ringed seal, the harp seal and the grey seal. These animals for the most part were common in the Littorina Sea but (apart from grey seal) are not found in the Baltic Sea now. Again, they could have been taken on land or in the shallows.

The species found raise the question of whether a whaling or sealing industry existed as such or whether the bones came from opportunistic scavenging. There is no direct evidence of voyaging out in dugouts to harpoon whales that could kill the voyagers in an instant. However, one of the two main types of pottery used was the blubber lamp, a small, oval deep dish in which you ignited a chunk of blubber or even oil with a wick. The widespread use of this lamp implies a widespread industry to obtain blubber; i.e., professional whale and seal hunting.

=== Hunting industry ===
Judging from the remains of animal bones at their sites, the Ertebølle people hunted mainly three types of land animals: large forest browsers, fur animals and maritime birds.

The forest mammals are the red deer and roe deer, which were dietary staples, and the wild boar, european elk, less frequently the aurochs, and a rare horse, believed to have been wild. Only a left foreleg from Østenkær remains. It offers definitive proof that horses lived in the forests of Europe. On the plains to the east they are only found in association with man. The boar were supplemented by swine with mixed European and Near Eastern ancestry, obtained through their Neolithic farming neighbors, as early as 4,600 BCE.

The fur animals are fairly widespread: the beaver, squirrel, polecat, badger, fox, lynx. Furs might have served as a currency and may have been traded to some degree, but this is speculation.

Maritime birds must have been easily taken in the marshes and ponds of the region: red-throated diver, black-throated diver, Dalmatian pelican, capercaille, grebe, cormorant, swan, and duck.

In addition are a few others: the dog and the wolf, and two snakes, the common grass snake, and the Aesculapian snake. As snakes do not appear in the art, it is impossible to say what cultural impact they had, if any.

=== Plant use ===
The EBK gathered berries for consumption and also prepared a number of wild plants, judging from the seed remains of plants that could not be consumed without preparation. Of the berries that have been found are raspberry (Rubus idaeus), dewberry (Rubus caesius), wild strawberry, dogwood (Cornus sanguinea), hawthorn (Crataegus monogyna and Crataegus oxyacantha), rowanberry (Sorbus aucuparia), crab apple, and rose hips.

Some seeds usually made into gruel in historical times are acorn and manna grass (Glyceria fluitans). Roots of the sea beet (Beta maritima) were prepared as well. That species is ancestral to modern domestic beets. Greens could have been boiled from nettle (Urtica dioica), orache (Atriplex), and goosefoot (Chenopodium album).

Some of the pottery evidences grain impressions, which some interpret as the use of food imported from the south. Certainly, they did not need to import food and were probably better nourished than the southerners. Analysis of charred remains in one pot indicates that it at least was used for fermenting a mixture of blood and nuts. Some have therefore guessed that fermentation of grain was used to produce beer.

Finally, fragments of textiles from Tybrind Vig were woven in the needle-netting technique from spun plant fibres.

== Tools and art ==
=== Settlement life ===
The many settlements on the coast and in the hinterland vary between large all-year-round settlements and smaller seasonal settlements. A settlement consisted of huts, probably brush supported by posts. The huts were in no special order. Fire pits located outside the huts indicate that most village functions were performed outdoors, with the dwellings used perhaps for storage and sleeping. At the time winters were mild.

An external fireplace from Ronaes Skae was constructed as a perimeter of stones surrounding a mud and clay hearth on which charred wood was found in a spoke pattern. The wood was collected from the shore. Fungus was used for tinder.

=== Pottery ===
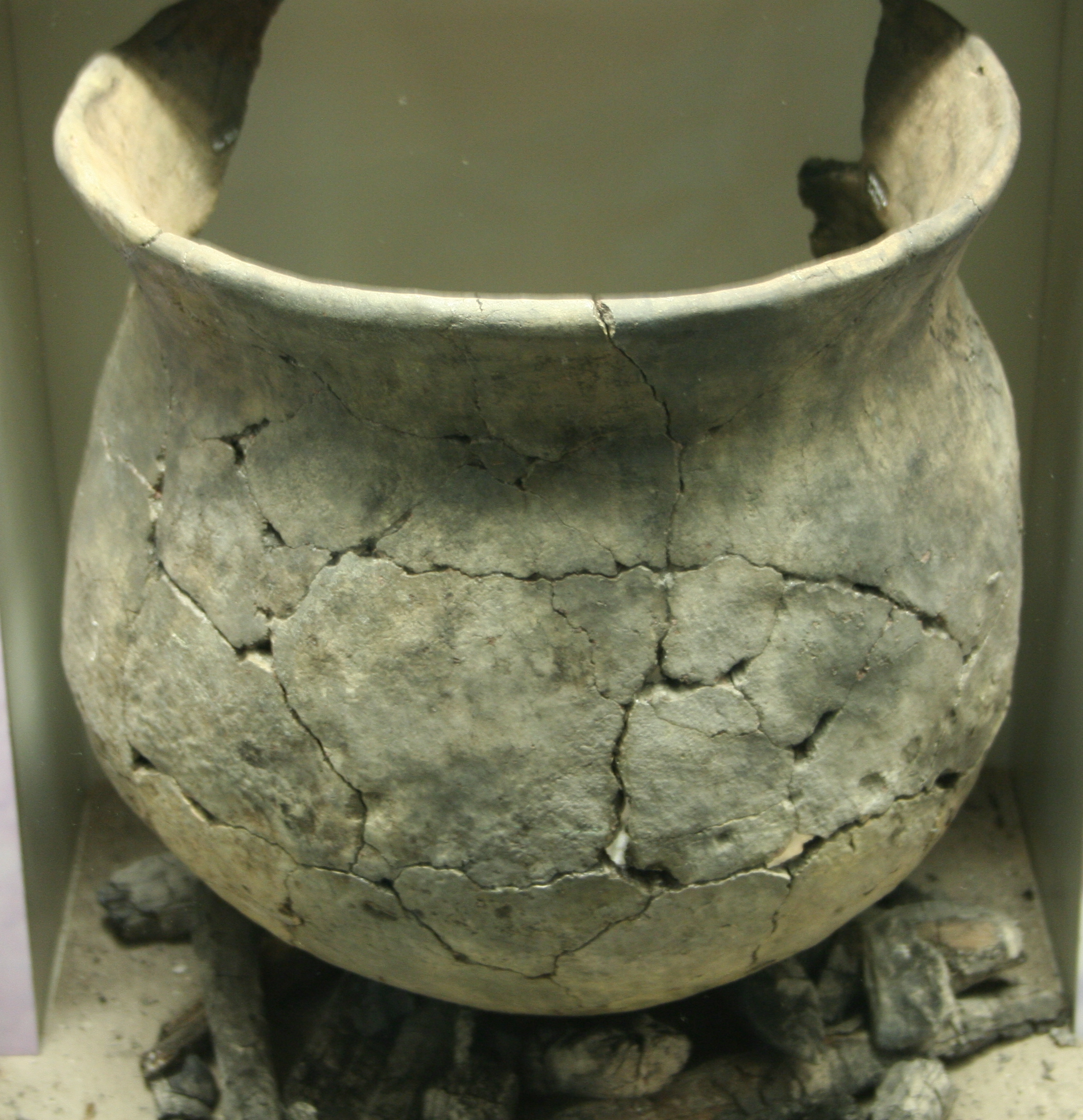
Pottery

Pottery was manufactured from native clays tempered with sand, crushed stone and organic material. The EBK pot was made by coil technique, being fired on the open bed of hot coals. It was not like the neighbouring Neolithic Linearbandkeramik and appears related instead to a pottery type that first appears in Europe in the Samara region of Russia c. 7,000 cal BCE, and spread up the Volga to the Eastern Baltic and then westward along the shore.

Two main types are found, a beaker and a lamp. The beaker is a pot-bellied pot narrowing at the neck, with a flanged, outward-turning rim. The bottom was typically formed into a point or bulb (the "funnel") of some sort that supported the pot when it was placed in clay or sand. One can imagine a sort of mobile pantry consisting of rows of jars set now in the hut, now by the fire, now in the clay layer at the bottom of a dugout.

The beaker came in various sizes from 8 to 50 cm high and from 5 to 20 cm in diameter. Decoration filled the entire surface with horizontal bands of fingertip or fingernail impressions. It must have been in the decoration phase that grains of wheat and barley left their impression in the clay. Late in the period technique and decoration became slightly more varied and sophisticated: the walls were thinner and different motifs were used in the impressions: chevrons, cord marks, and punctures made with animal bones. Handles are sometimes added and the rims may turn in instead of out.

The blubber lamp was molded from a single piece of clay. The use of such lamps suggests some household activity in the huts after dark.

=== Tool kit ===
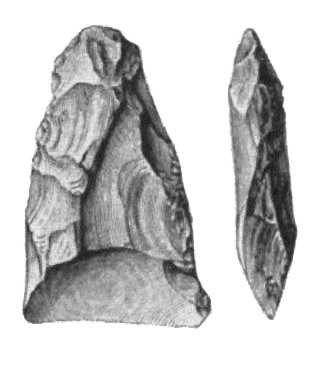
flake axe

The flint industry evolved a high and unified standard with small and flake axes, long lithic flakes (knives), and arrow heads. However, tools of many materials were in use: wood prongs and points, antler parts, carved bone tools.

=== Art ===
Paddles from Tybrind Vig show traces of highly developed and artistic woodcarving. This is an example of the embellishment of functional pieces. The population also polished and engraved non-functional or not obviously functional pieces of bone or antler. Motifs were predominantly geometric with some anthropomorphic or zoomorphic forms. Also in evidence (for example, at Fanø) are polished amber representations of animals, such as birds, boars, and bears. Jewelry was made of animal teeth or decorative shells. To what extent any of these pieces were symbolic of wealth and status is not clear.

=== Funerary customs ===
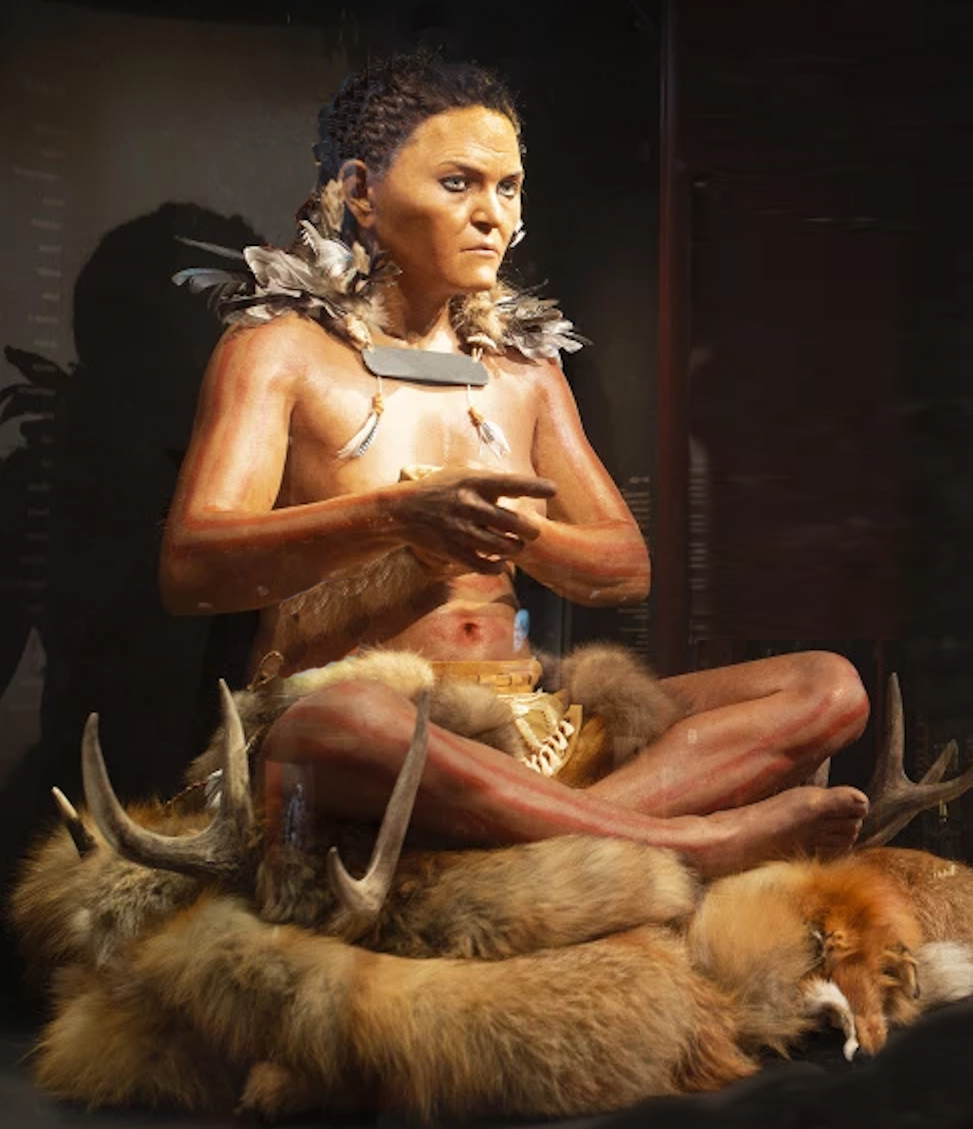
A late Scandinavian Hunter-Gatherer, buried seated, dated circa 7,000 BP, from Skateholm, near Trelleborg in southwest Sweden. Reconstruction by Oscar Nilsson, Trelleborgs Museum.

Cemeteries, such as the ones at Vedbæk and Skateholm, give a "sedentary" character to the settlements. Red ochre and deer antlers were placed in some graves, but not others. Some social distinctions may therefore have been made. There was some appreciation of sexual dimorphism: the women wore necklaces and belts of animal teeth and shells. No special body position was used. Both burial and cremation were practiced. At Møllegabet, an individual was buried in a dugout, which some see as the beginning of Scandinavian boat burials.

== See also ==
- Goseck Circle
- Kunda culture
- Narva culture
- Nøstvet and Lihult cultures
- Old Europe (archaeology)
- Prehistoric Europe
- Scandinavian prehistory
- Swifterbant culture
