= TMEM62 =

Human gene

Identifiers
- Aliases: TMEM62, transmembrane protein 62
- External IDs: MGI: 2139461; GeneCards: TMEM62

Gene location (Human)
Chr.	Chromosome 15 (human)
Band	15q15.2	Start	43,123,279 bp
Band	15q15.2	End	43,185,144 bp

Gene location (Mouse)
Chr.	Chromosome 2 (mouse)
Band	2|2 E5	Start	120,807,498 bp
Band	2|2 E5	End	120,838,333 bp
RNA expression pattern
Bgee	Human / Mouse (ortholog); Top expressed in: sural nerve; cerebellar hemisphere; bone marrow cell; right hemisphere of cerebellum; mucosa of transverse colon; Achilles tendon; rectum; granulocyte; islet of Langerhans; gastric mucosa / Top expressed in: cerebellar vermis; lobe of cerebellum; epithelium of stomach; esophagus; blastocyst; lip; gastrula; mucous cell of stomach; dorsomedial hypothalamic nucleus; neural layer of retina; More reference expression data
BioGPS	n/a
Orthologs
Databases	NCBI: entry; OMA: entry
Species	Human	Mouse
Entrez	80021	96957
Ensembl	ENSG00000137842	ENSMUSG00000054484
UniProt	Q0P6H9	Q8BXJ9
RefSeq (mRNA)	NM_001347004; NM_001347005; NM_001347006; NM_001347007; NM_001347008 NM_001347009; NM_001347010; NM_001347011; NM_001347012; NM_001347013; NM_001347014; NM_001347015; NM_001347016; NM_001347017; NM_001347018; NM_001347019; NM_001347020; NM_001347021; NM_001347023; NM_001347024; NM_001347025; NM_001347026; NM_001347027; NM_001347028; NM_001347029; NM_001347030; NM_001347031; NM_001347032; NM_001347033; NM_001347034; NM_024956	NM_175285
RefSeq (protein)	NP_001333933; NP_001333934; NP_001333935; NP_001333936; NP_001333937 NP_001333938; NP_001333939; NP_001333940; NP_001333941; NP_001333942; NP_001333943; NP_001333944; NP_001333945; NP_001333946; NP_001333947; NP_001333948; NP_001333949; NP_001333950; NP_001333952; NP_001333953; NP_001333954; NP_001333955; NP_001333956; NP_001333957; NP_001333958; NP_001333959; NP_001333960; NP_001333961; NP_001333962; NP_001333963; NP_079232	NP_780494
Location (UCSC)	Chr 15: 43.12 – 43.19 Mb	Chr 2: 120.81 – 120.84 Mb
PubMed search
- Wikidata
View/Edit Human	View/Edit Mouse

Transmembrane protein 62 (TMEM62) is a protein which in Homo Sapiens is encoded by the TMEM62 gene. TMEM62 is an uncharacterized transmembrane protein predicted to be in a helicase related family The TMEM62 protein is predicted to be membrane-associated with several transmembrane helices and a compact, structured core. Expression analysis indicate that TMEM62 is variably and ubiquitously expressed at low to moderate levels across most tissues, with relatively higher expression in the brain and intentional tissues. The function of TMEM62 is unknown but computational and expression based analysis suggest a potential role in hydrolase activity, cell signaling, immune related processes, and gene regulation.

== Gene ==
The TMEM62 gene is located on human chromosome 15 (15q15.2). The gene spans 2,707 basepairs from the start of transcription to the poly(A) site and contains 14 exons in its longest transcript variant (transcript variant 1).

== Transcripts ==
Table 1: Gene and Protein Isoforms
Isoform	Transcript Accession	Size (nt)	Protein Accession	Protein Length (aa)
a	NM_024956.4	2,707	NP_079232.3	643
b1	NM_001347004.1	2,598	NP_001333933.1	513
b2	NM_001347005.2	2,595	NP_001333934.1	513
b3	NM_001347006.2	2,739	NP_001333935.1	513
b4	NM_001347007.2	2,627	NP_001333936.1	513
c1	NM_001347008.1	2,440	NP_001333937.1	511
c2	NM_001347009.1	2,552	NP_001333938.1	511
c3	NM_001347010.2	2,661	NP_001333939.1	511
c4	NM_001347011.2	2,549	NP_001333940.1	511
c5	NM_001347012.2	2,581	NP_001333941.1	511
c6	NM_001347013.2	2,693	NP_001333942.1	511
d1	NM_001347014.1	2,381	NP_001333943.1	478
d2	NM_001347015.2	2,634	NP_001333944.1	478
d3	NM_001347016.2	2,490	NP_001333945.1	478
e1	NM_001347017.2	2,444	NP_001333946.1	476
e2	NM_001347018.2	2,556	NP_001333947.1	476
f1	NM_001347019.1	2,298	NP_001333948.1	438
f2	NM_001347020.2	2,519	NP_001333949.1	438
f3	NM_001347021.2	2,439	NP_001333950.1	438
f4	NM_001347023.2	2,407	NP_001333952.1	438
g1	NM_001347024.1	2,305	NP_001333953.1	403
g2	NM_001347025.1	2,193	NP_001333954.1	403
g3	NM_001347026.2	2,414	NP_001333955.1	403
g4	NM_001347027.2	2,302	NP_001333956.1	403
g5	NM_001347028.2	2,446	NP_001333957.1	403
g6	NM_001347029.2	2,334	NP_001333958.1	403
h	NM_001347030.1	2,114	NP_001333959.1	389
i	NM_001347031.2	2,335	NP_001333960.1	519
j	NM_001347032.2	2,602	NP_001333961.1	608
k	NM_001347033.2	2,440	NP_001333962.1	554
l	NM_001347034.2	2,348	NP_001333963.1	400
X1	XM_047433101.1	2,584	XP_047289057.1	602
X2	XM_047433102.1	2,479	XP_047289058.1	567
X3	XM_047433103.1	2,335	XP_047289059.1	476
X4	XM_047433104.1	2,056	XP_047289060.1	435
X5	XM_047433105.1	1,977	XP_047289061.1	427
X6	XM_024450071.2	2,328	XP_024305839.1	424
X7	XM_024450072.2	1,997	XP_024305840.1	371

== Protein ==
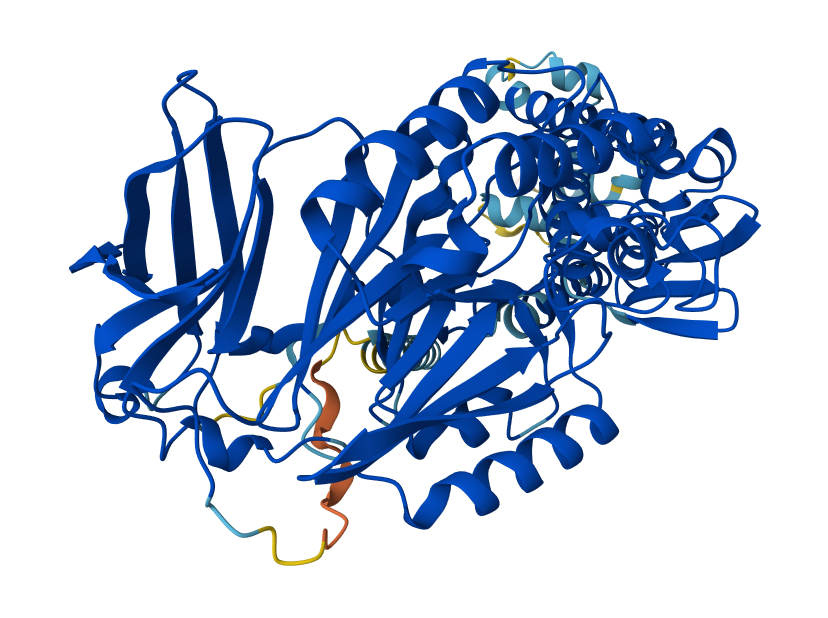
Figure 1. AlphaFold predicted TMEM62 tertiary protein structure.

TMEM62 protein (isoform a) is 643 amino acids long with a theoretical molecular weight of ~73.1 kDa and a theoretical isoelectric point of 9.34. TMEM62 is enriched in hydrophobic amino acids (residues such as leucine, valine, isoleucine, phenylalanine, methionine, and alanine are enriched relative to average human proteins) consistent with its classification as a multi-pass transmembrane protein. SAPS analysis does not identify extensive low complexity regions. Short localized repeats involving proline, serine, and histidine are present but do not dominate the sequence and may contribute to local flexibility. Several short recurring motifs are present but no long tandem repeats or simple sequence repeats are detected, suggesting that TMEM62 is structurally constrained. Homology based analysis identified three significant motifs for the TMEM62 protein including TMEM62 C-terminal domain (TMEM62_C), TMEM62 Ig-like domain (Ig_TMM62), calcineurin-like phosphoesterase (Metallophos). These domains suggest involvement in cellular signaling, gene regulation, and adaptive immune responses. Some or all of these domains are conserved across vertebrate orthologs. The secondary protein structure prediction for TMEM62 suggests a very long continuous alpha helix at the N terminus followed by alternating alpha helices and beta sheets. The short beta sheets are clustered together with alpha helices between them and loops connecting them. There is a transition region where alpha helices and beta sheets are still alternating but it starts to become more helical and buried. From around the middle of the sequence to the C terminus there are almost only alpha helices that are strongly buried. No strong coiled segments were predicted. The tertiary protein structure prediction for TMEM62 has a very high confidence level of 91.75% (Fig.1).

== Gene level regulation ==
TMEM62 exhibits low tissue specificity, with variable and ubiquitous expression detected across many tissues at low to moderate levels. An expression cluster is found in the intestine and brain expression mainly occurs in the neurons (nucleosome) but overall there is low human brain regional specificity. RNA sequencing data shows relatively higher expression in the brain (cerebellum), colon, duodenum, gall bladder, placenta, small intestine, and thyroid. Lower expression is observed in the ovary, pancreas, skin, and testis. Overall TMEM62 shows low cell type specificity with an expression cluster in adaptive immunity B-cells showing a mainly humoral response. Immunohistochemical staining of TMEM62 in the human kidney shows strong membranous positivity in tubule cells. The cytoplasmic expression of the TMEM62 protein is found in most tissues with membranous expression in few tissues including small intestines. TMEM62 protein is predicted to be located in the membrane and intracellular.

== Protein level regulation ==
TMEM62 is predicted to be localized in the endoplasmic reticulum with 43.5% confidence from PSORT II and a probability of 0.8308 from DeepLoc. Post-translational modification analyses predict one signal propeptide cleavage, four N-linked glycosylation sites, one O-glycosylation site, and various serine/threonine phosphorylation sites. It is predicted that TMEM62 has no C-mannosylation sites and is not GPI-anchored.

== Homology and evolution ==
=== Paralogs ===
No paralogs of TMEM62 have been identified in Homo sapiens.

=== Orthologs ===
Table 2: TMEM62 Orthologs and Related Properties
	Genus/species	Common name	Taxonomic group	Med. Date of divergence (mya)	Accession number	sequence length	sequence identity	sequence similarity
Primata	Homo sapiens	Human	Hominidae	0	NP_079232.3	643	100%	100.00%
Mammalia	Otolemur garnettii	Northern greater galago	Galagidae	74	XP_012661807.1	437	60.7%	63.8%
	Mus musculus	House mouse	Muridae	87	NP_780494.1	643	83.2%	91.0%
	Bos taurus	Domestic cattle	Bovidae	94	NP_001192426.1	643	83.8%	91.0%
Reptilia	Chelonia mydas	Green sea turtle	Cheloniidae	319	EMP39578.1	401	40.6%	48.2%
Amphibia	Bombina bombina	Fire bellied toad	Bombinatoridae	352	XP_053553778.1	647	59.0%	75.4%
	Ambystoma mexicanum	Axolotyl	Ambystomatidae	352	XP_069475389.1	638	59.4%	73.3%
	Pleurodeles waltl	Liberian ribbed newt	Salamandridae	352	XP_069070694.1	636	59.8%	74.3%
	Bufotes viridis	European green toad	Bufonidae	352	CAN2020809.1	644	55.7%	72.0%
	Spea bombifrons	Plains spadefoot toad	Scaphiopodidae	352	XP_053331252.1	647	58.3%	73.5%
Fish	Atractosteus spatula	Aligator gar	Lepisosteidae	429	MBN3311900.1	646	56.2%	71.1%
	Amia calva	Bowfin	Amiidae	429	MBN3296123.1	651	56.2%	72.9%
	Astyanax mexicanus	Mexican tetra	Characidae	429	XP_049319844.1	650	55.1%	70.3%
	Pygocentrus nattereri	Red bellied piranha	Serrasalmidae	429	XP_017549856.1	650	54.9%	69.2%

=== Paralogs ===
TMEM62 does not have any paralogs.

=== Distant homologs ===
Orthologs are detected across vertebrate lineages ranging from cartilaginous fish through ray-finned fish, amphibians, reptiles, and mammals, indicating conservation within vertebrates. No orthologs have been identified outside vertebrates, and there is no evidence of gene duplication within the mammalian lineage, as no paralogs have been detected. The TMEM62 gene likely emerged after the divergence of early chordates, as no orthologs have been detected after cartilaginous fish or in invertebrates.

== Interacting proteins ==
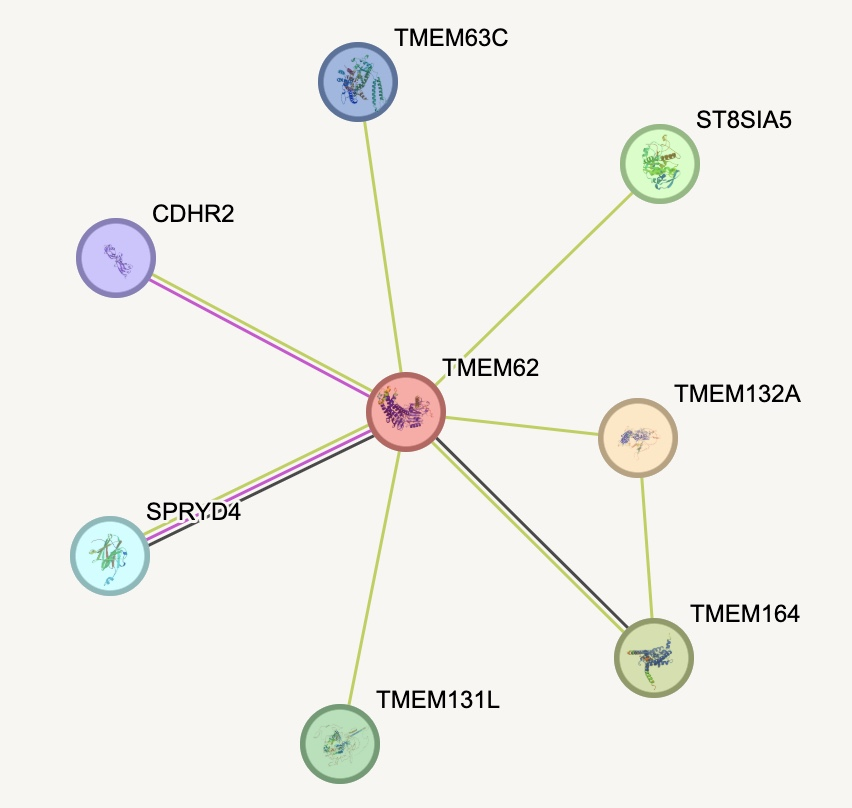
Figure 2. STRING TMEM62 Interacting Protein Analysis

Predicted protein interaction analyses suggest that TMEM62 may associate with several membrane associated and signaling related proteins. TMEM62 shows a predicted interaction with TMEM132A which is involved in embryonic and postnatal brain development that regulates cAMP-induced GFAP gene expression via STAT3 phosphorylation, suggesting a potential link between TMEM62 and neural signaling pathways. TMEM131L antagonizes canonical Wnt signaling by promoting lysosome-dependent degradation of activated LRP6 and regulates thymocyte proliferation, indicating a possible role for TMEM62 in growth or immune related signaling contexts. TMEM63C acts as an osmosensitive calcium permeable cation channel required for maintaining kidney glomerular filtration barrier integrity, suggesting TMEM62 involvement in membrane stress or ion-regulated processes. Other predicted protein interactions include ST8SIA5, CDHR2, SPRYD4, and SPRYD4.

Table 3: TMEM62 Interacting Proteins
Protein	Full Name	Basis of Identification	Score	Function	More Information
TMEM132A	Transmembrane protein 132A	Textmining	0.511	May play a role in embryonic and postnatal development of the brain	Regulates cAMP-induced GFAP gene expression via STAT3 phosphorylation
TMEM164	Transmembrane protein 164	Co-expression Textmining	0.488	N/A	N/A
ST8SIA5	Alpha-2,8-sialyltransferase 8E	Textmining	0.483	May be involved in the synthesis of gangliosides	Belongs to the glycosyltransferase 29 family.
TMEM131L	Transmembrane protein 131-like	Textmining	0.467	Membrane associated form that antagonizes canonical Wnt signaling by triggering lysosome dependent degradation of Wnt-activated LRP6	Regulates thymocyte proliferation
SPRYD4	SPRY domain containing 4	Experimentally determined Textmining Co-expression	0.429	N/A	N/A
TMEM63C	Calcium permeable stress-gated cation channel 1	Textmining	0.405	Acts as an osmosensitive calcium permeable cation channel	Required for the functional integrity of the kidney glomerular filtration barrier
CDHR2	Cadherin-related family member 2	Gene fusions Textmining	0.404	Controls microvillar spacing, alignment, and packing	May also play a role in cell-cell adhesion and contact inhibition in epithelial cells

== Clinical significance ==
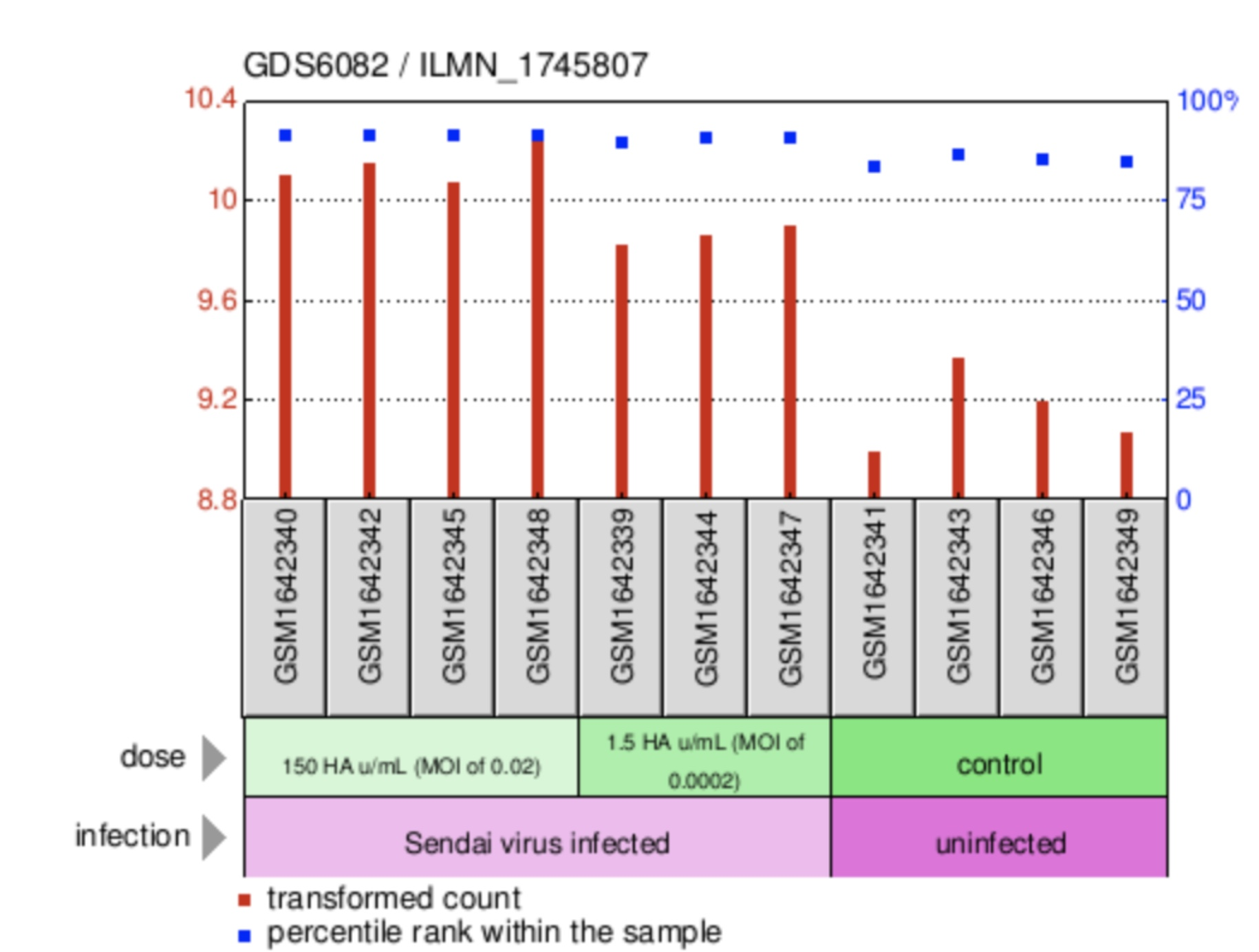
Figure 3. NCBI Geo Profiles Conditions for TMEM62 Expression

Increased TMEM62 expression in cells caused tumor growth to slow, improved survival rates, and reduced tumor burden was found for high TMEM62 expression. TMEM62 likely acts through promoting tumor cell senescence (damaged cells stop dividing permanently) and influencing immune responses.

The structure of TMEM62 caused it to be predicted as a putative lipoxygenase that could modify arachidonic acid into signaling molecules to regulate inflammation and promote tissue remodeling

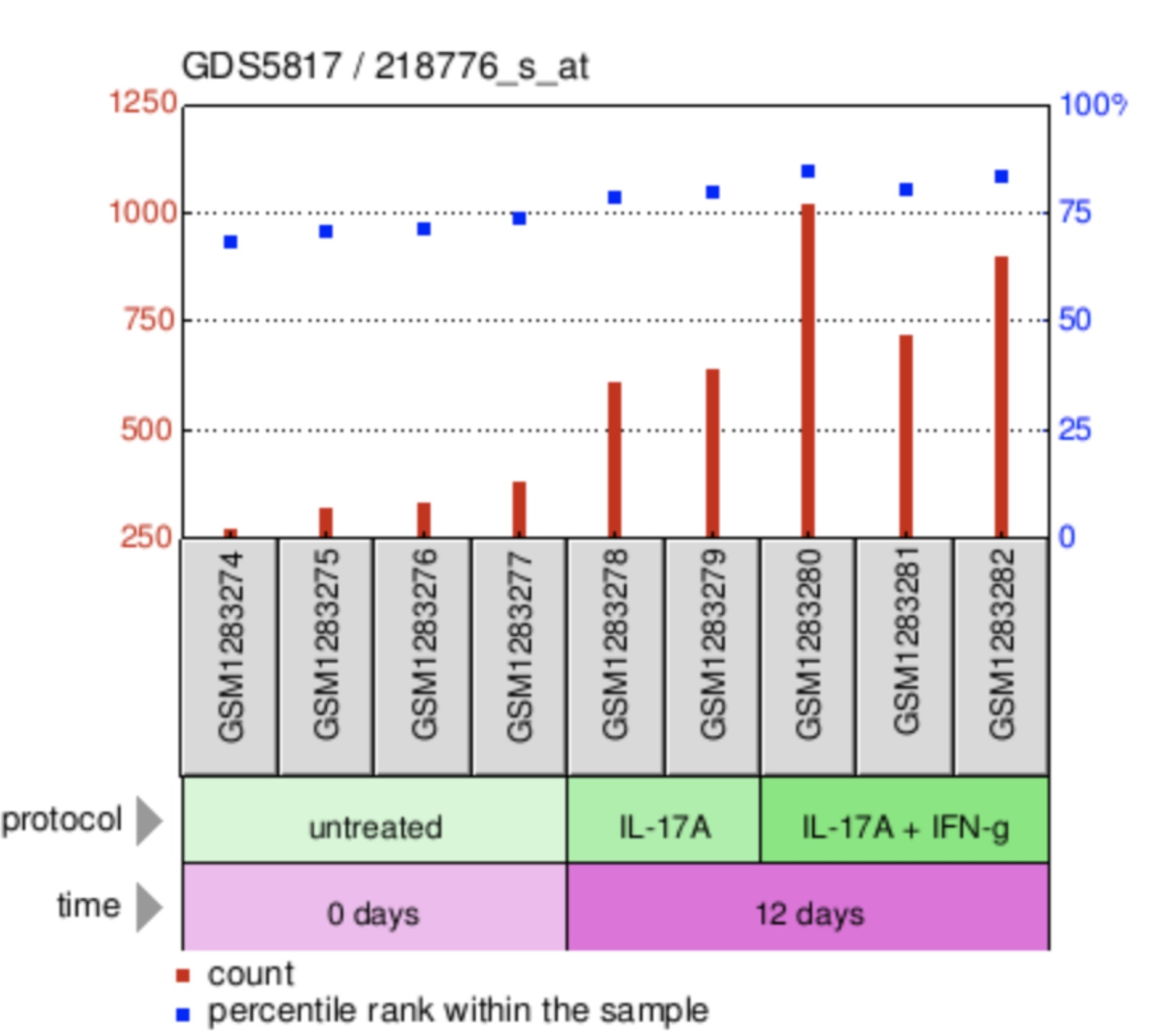
Figure 4. NCBI Geo Profiles Conditions for TMEM62 Expression

Figure 3 shows the expression of the TMEM62 gene changes in human monocytic cells when they are infected with the Sendai virus at a high and low dose. TMEM62 is expressed 92% more than other genes in the sample with a high dose, the low dose also shows expression in the low 90s, and the control shows expression around 85% on average. The graph shows the highest expression for the high dose of the virus and it decreases with the low dose and shows lowest expression in the control. However, the TMEM62 expression is fairly low in all groups overall.

Figure 4 shows how the expression of the TMEM62 gene changes in human monocyte derived dendritic cells under different cytokine treatments. The untreated dendritic cells have low TMEM62 expression compared to the treated groups and rank 69-74% compared to the expression of other genes in the sample. The IL-17A treatment greatly increases TMEM62 expression and the rank increases to 80%. The IL-17A + IFN-g treatment increases the expression even further with the highest expression ranking being 85%.
