= Trelleborg =

Town in Skåne, Sweden

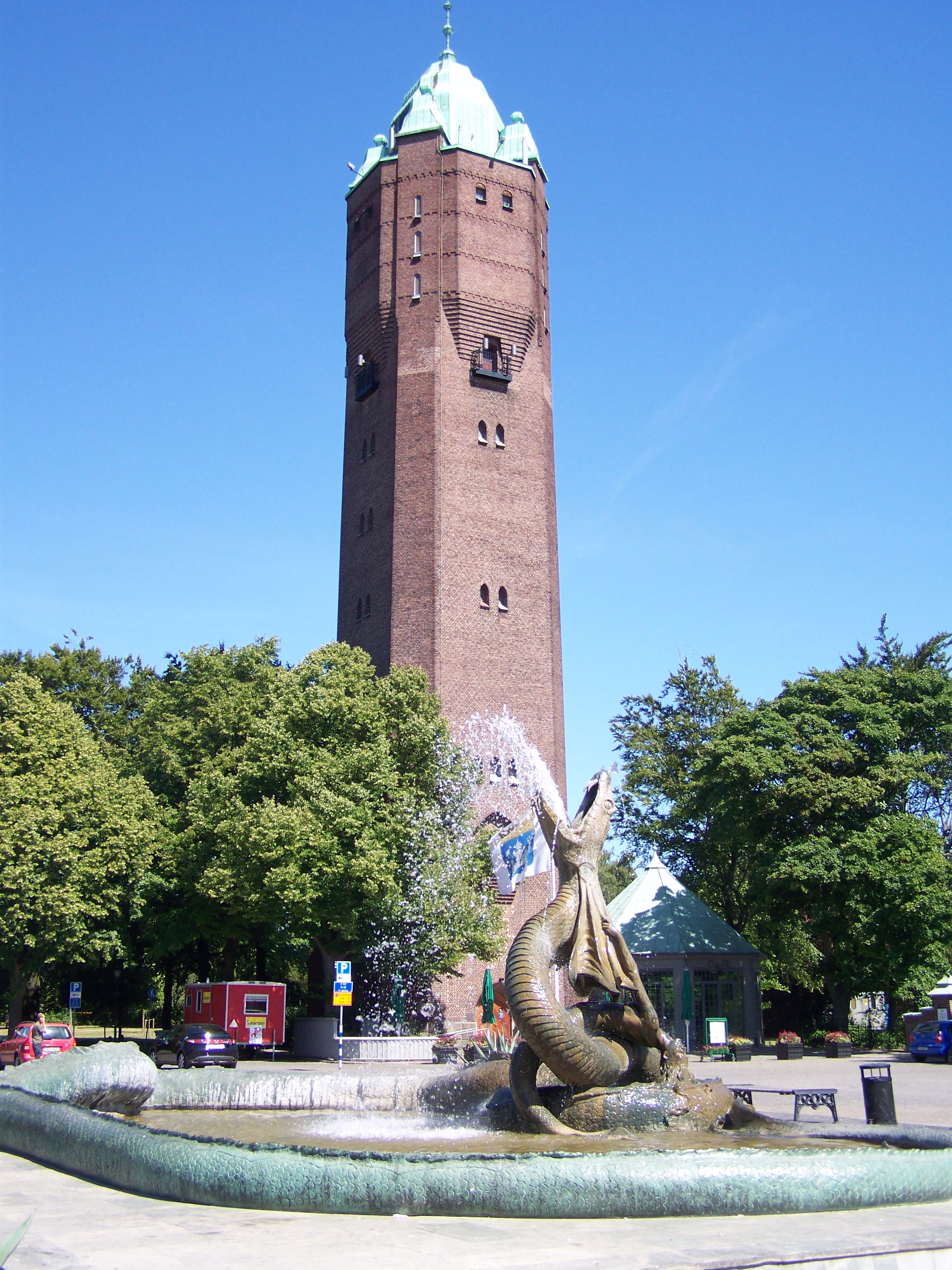
- Trelleborg Old Water Tower

- Coat of arms

- Location within Sweden
- Coordinates: 55°22′N 13°10′E
- Country: Sweden
- Province: Scania
- County: Skåne County
- Municipality: Trelleborg Municipality

Area
  - Total: 13.66 km^{2} (5.27 sq mi)

Population (31 December 2023)
  - Total: 47,269
  - Density: 2,071/km^{2} (5,360/sq mi)
- Time zone: UTC+1 (CET)
  - Summer (DST): UTC+2 (CEST)

Trelleborg (Swedish pronunciation: [trɛlɛˈbɔrj]) is a port town in Skåne County, Sweden, with 47,269 inhabitants in 2023. It is the southernmost town in Sweden located some 10–15 kilometres (6.2–9.3 mi) west from the southernmost point of Sweden and the Scandinavian Peninsula. It is one of the most important ferry towns in Scandinavia as well as around the Baltic Sea, and the main town of the Söderslätt agricultural areas.

== Etymology ==
The first written record of the name is from 1257, Threlæburgh. The name is found in many places in Scandinavia. Borg means castle or stronghold and träl can mean thrall, but can also refer to the leaning poles on the outside of the medieval Viking stronghold. Remains of the original stronghold were excavated in 1988.

The name may also have originated from the stronghold that still remains in the center of the city. Strongholds like that have been found at several places around Scandinavia, mostly in the south of Sweden and Denmark, and are all called trelleborgs. The name is likely to have originated from that borg.

== History ==
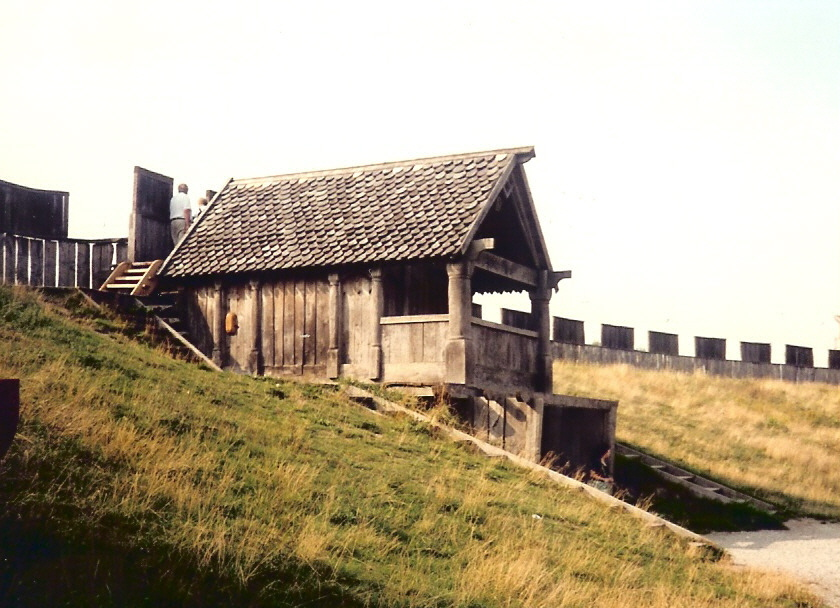
Trelleborgen, a reconstructed Viking ring castle in Trelleborg

The earliest written record of Trelleborg is from 1257. Three years later Trelleborg was presented as a wedding gift from the Danish royal family to the Swedish Prince Valdemar. It was soon reconquered by the Danes, and continued to belong to Denmark until 1658, when Scania was lost to Sweden by the Treaty of Roskilde.

In medieval times, Trelleborg had an important part in herring fishing. At that time, this was conducted along the entire coastline of what is now Sweden, as the herring shoals were of such great numbers that fishermen were said to have been able to stand on the shore and land fish with nets. Trelleborg became an important merchant city as merchants from Germany came to trade herring. In 1619 following a devastating fire, the Danish King decided that one merchant city on the coast was sufficient and revoked Trelleborg's status as a merchant city in favour of Malmö.

Not until 1840 was Trelleborg allowed to become a merchant city, and not until 1867 did it regain its rights as a city of Sweden. Mostly this was thanks to the work of a few stubborn men, who had continuously been petitioning the Swedish Riksdag with these requests since 1658.

In 1962, in Trelleborg, a group of Macedonian political emigrants founded the Movement for the Liberation and Unification of Macedonia.

The local government reform of 1971 made Trelleborg the seat of Trelleborg Municipality, covering both rural and urban areas.

== Transport ==
=== Road ===
Trelleborg is the southern endpoint for the European route E6 that goes north to Kirkenes, Norway. The E6 is a major artery for shipping goods into Sweden, connecting to the E22 in Malmö, and the E4 in Helsingborg.

=== Harbour and ferries ===
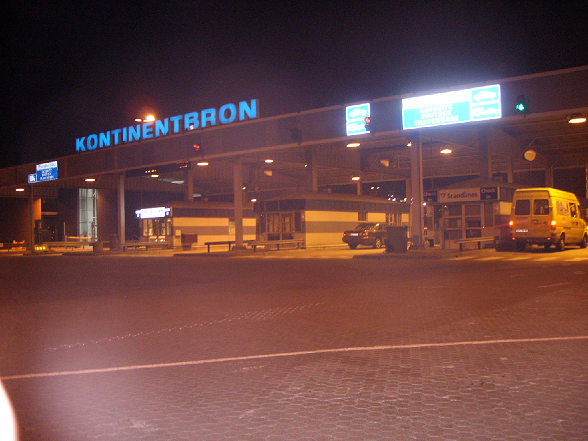
The ferry station in Trelleborg, "The Continental Bridge", serves three shipping lines at four different routes, and in all six different ferry lines.

The harbour has a very strategic position, in the very far south of the Scandinavian Peninsula. The first ferry connection to Germany opened in 1897. This was replaced with a train-ferry line to Saßnitz, in 1909 as a part of the line Malmö - Berlin. During the GDR era, a longer car ferry line opened to Travemünde ("modern harbour" of Lübeck), initially as line owned by the Swedish national railways (SJ), but known as TT-Line from 1962. After the fall of the Berlin Wall in 1989, several new shipping lines and routes opened. Trelleborg municipality built a joint ferry terminal for all services, known as "Kontinentbron", or "the Continental Bridge". Both Germany and Poland can be reached by ferries from the terminal. As of 2018, the following shipping lines and routes are in operation:

TT-Line

- to Klaipėda (Lithuania)
- to Travemünde (Germany)
- to Rostock (Germany)
- to Swinoujscie (Poland)

Stena Line

- to Rostock (Germany)

Unity Line

- to Swinoujscie (Poland)

Most of the ferry transports are lorries, and this makes Trelleborg's port the largest in Sweden in terms of goods by weight. In 2005, 11 million metric ton of goods passed through the port (along with almost 2 million passengers).

== Climate ==
Although Trelleborg does not have an official month to month weather station featured in SMHI's reports, its nearest weather stations in Falsterbo and Malmö both indicate an oceanic climate (Cfb) with warm and sometimes hot summers averaging in the low twenties Celsius most of the time and cool but generally not very cold winters with means at or just above freezing.

== Today ==
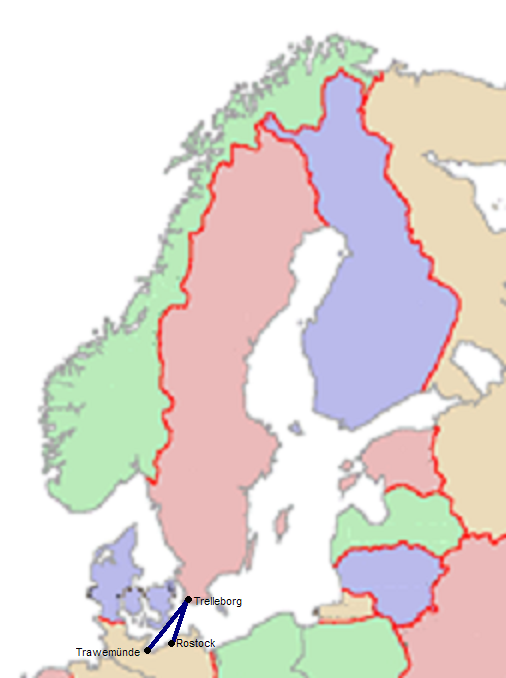
TT-Line ferry routes; the company operates regular service between Trelleborg and Germany

At the end of the 19th century, Trelleborg became an industrial town and the foundation of modern Trelleborg has largely been created by a few large companies; most notably Trelleborg Industries and the ferry company and business related to the seaport. Much of it has been the work of the influential businessman Johan Kock. Other important industries he established were Akzo Nobel Inks, Today called Flint Group Sweden, manufacturing printing inks (established as Gleitzman Industries in the 1890s), and DUX, who make beds. Later in the 1950s, Perstorp (Flooring) Industries was established in Trelleborg and it manufactures flooring boards and other plastic material. Trelleborg continues to be a working-class-oriented city and is politically a traditional stronghold for the Swedish Social Democratic Party. However, since the latest elections in 2006 the Social Democratic Party is in opposition in the municipality.

It is today often visited by people travelling from Sweden to Germany because of the ferries to Rostock, Sassnitz, and Lübeck - Travemünde in Germany. These ferries began sailing on 1 May 1897, with the Sassnitz line; the route to Travemünde was established in 1962, while the line to the former East German city Rostock was inaugurated after the fall of the Berlin Wall in 1989. The ferries carry both passengers on one-day journeys, cars with vacationing families, and heavy trucks on their way through Europe. In April 1917, Lenin arrived with the ferry from Sassnitz to Trelleborg on his way from exile back to Russia to lead the Revolution.

Today Trelleborg has the second largest seaport of Sweden, behind Gothenburg. Every year it transports more than 10 million metric tonnes of cargo.

Overlooking the harbour of Smygehuk near Trelleborg is a statue of a nude woman that was installed in 1930. Actress Uma Thurman's grandmother, Birgit Holmquist, the mother of Nena von Schlebrügge, was the model for this statue. The entrance road from west has a row of palm trees, illustrating the southern location of the city. They are moved indoors during winter as they can't tolerate freezing temperatures.

On 12 October 2017, several people were injured in shootings in the town, linked to gang violence.

== Sports and other leisure activities ==
Football clubs in Trelleborg include Trelleborgs FF, IFK Trelleborg, and FC Trelleborg the basketball team is called Trelleborg Basket.

The local scout corps is called Trelleborgs scoutkår. Other places of interest include the bathhouse, local golf club, sporthalls, beaches and several parks.

== Notable individuals ==
- Andreas Isaksson - retired football player, played for Trelleborgs FF for two seasons.
- Katrin Stjernfeldt Jammeh - current mayor of Malmö Municipality since 2013, raised in Trelleborg
- Patric Kjellberg - retired ice hockey player
- Björn Kjellman - actor and singer
- Andreas Nilsson - handballer
- Olivia Nordgren - politician
- Amanda Ooms - actress and writer
- Alice Timander - dentist
- Kim Wall - journalist
- Mark Weinberg - former judge of the Court of Appeal of the Supreme Court of Victoria in Victoria, Australia, born in Trelleborg in 1948 and later relocated to the United States before emigrating permanently to Australia in 1958.
- Franz Brorsson - football player

== Culture ==
Trelleborg has two museums as of 2022, Trelleborgs Museum centered around the old viking castle rebuilt in the city, and another depicting different installations at different times. Several different statues can be found around the city especially depicting the works of Axel Ebbe. An art i gallery can be found in the city depicting his works.

== Gallery ==
=== 20th century ===
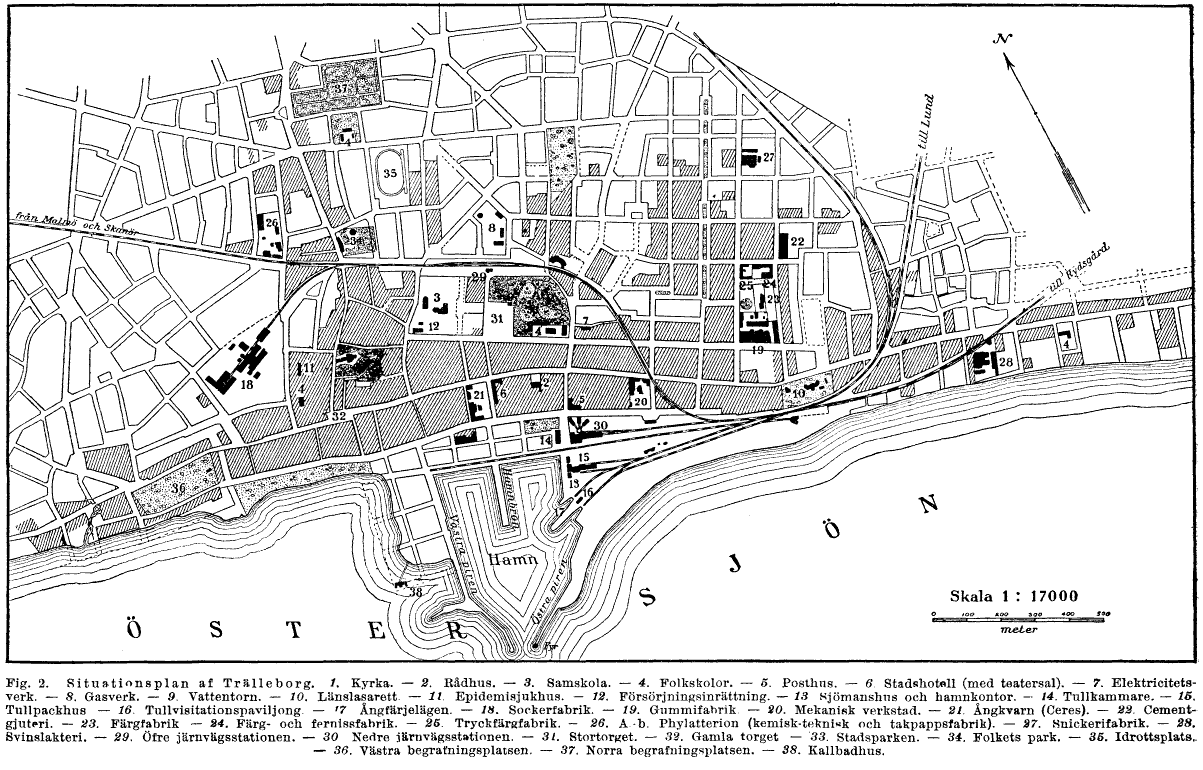
Map of Trelleborg dated 1930

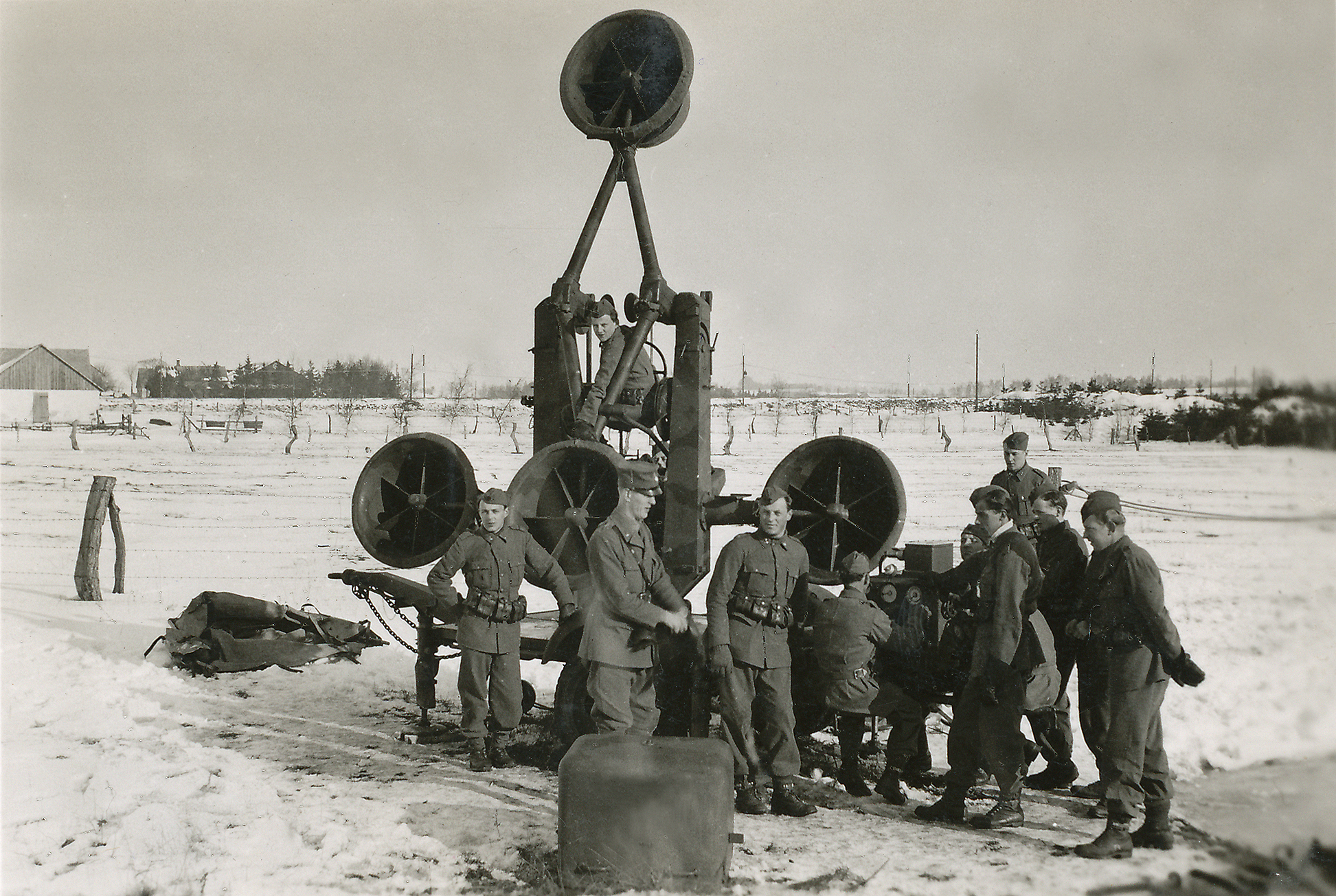
Acoustic air-plane locator stationed in Trelleborg during World War II

=== 21st century ===
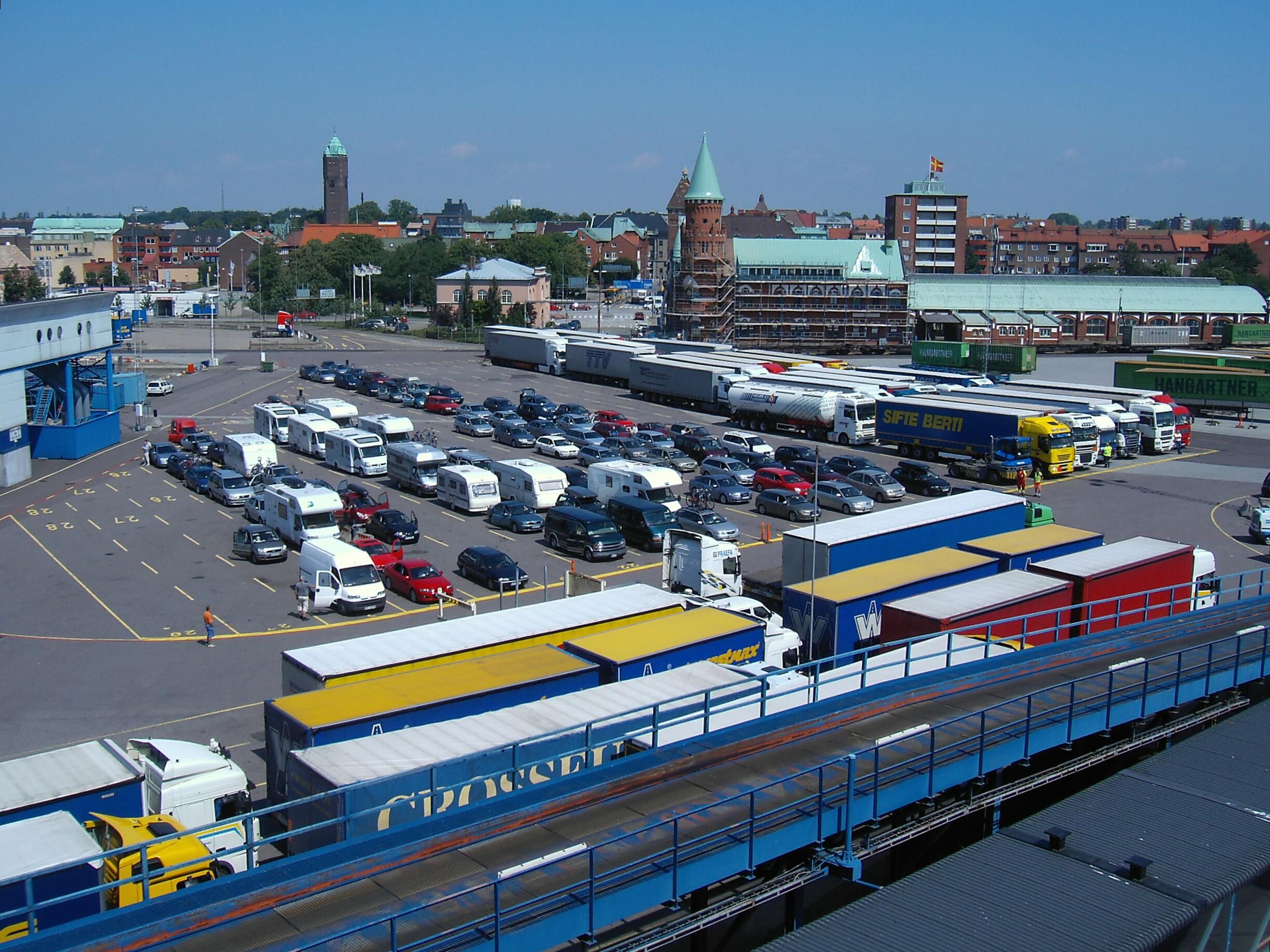
Part of Trelleborg harbour

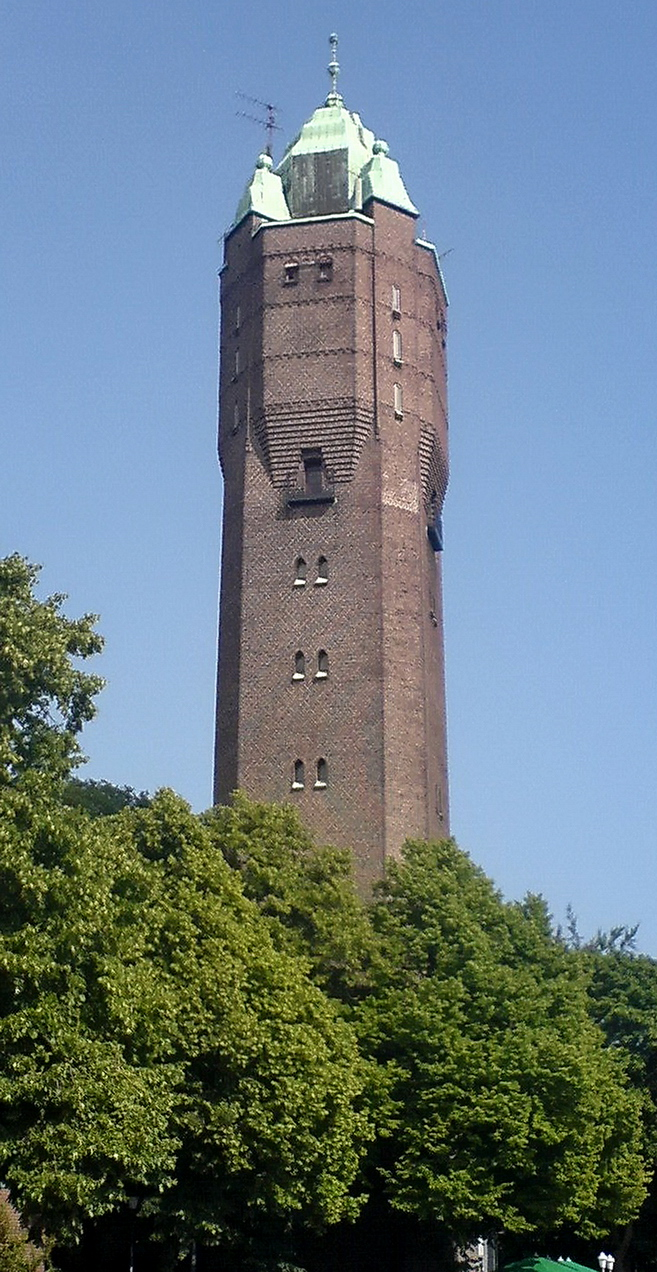
Trelleborg Old Water Tower

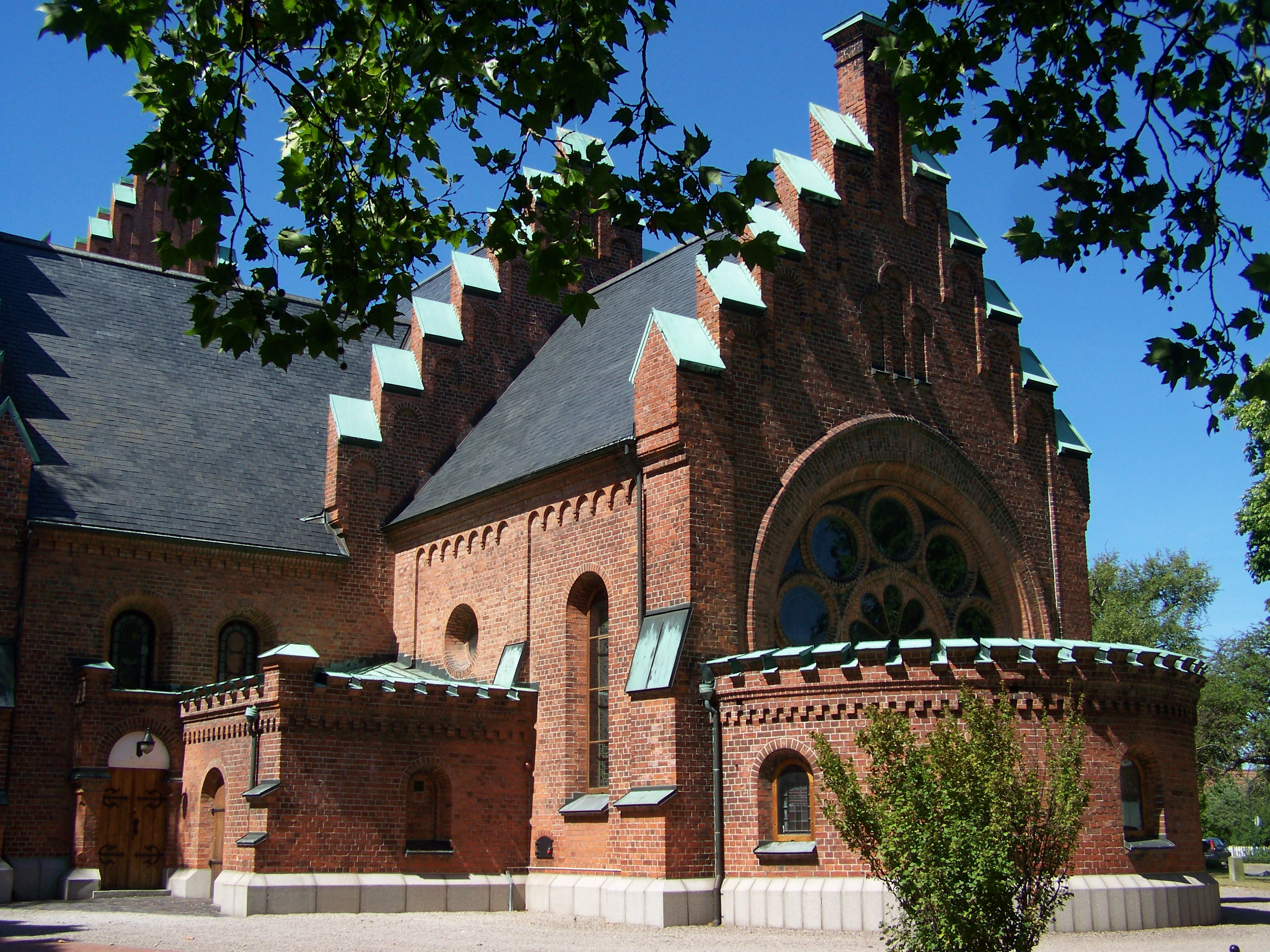
Church of St. Nicolai

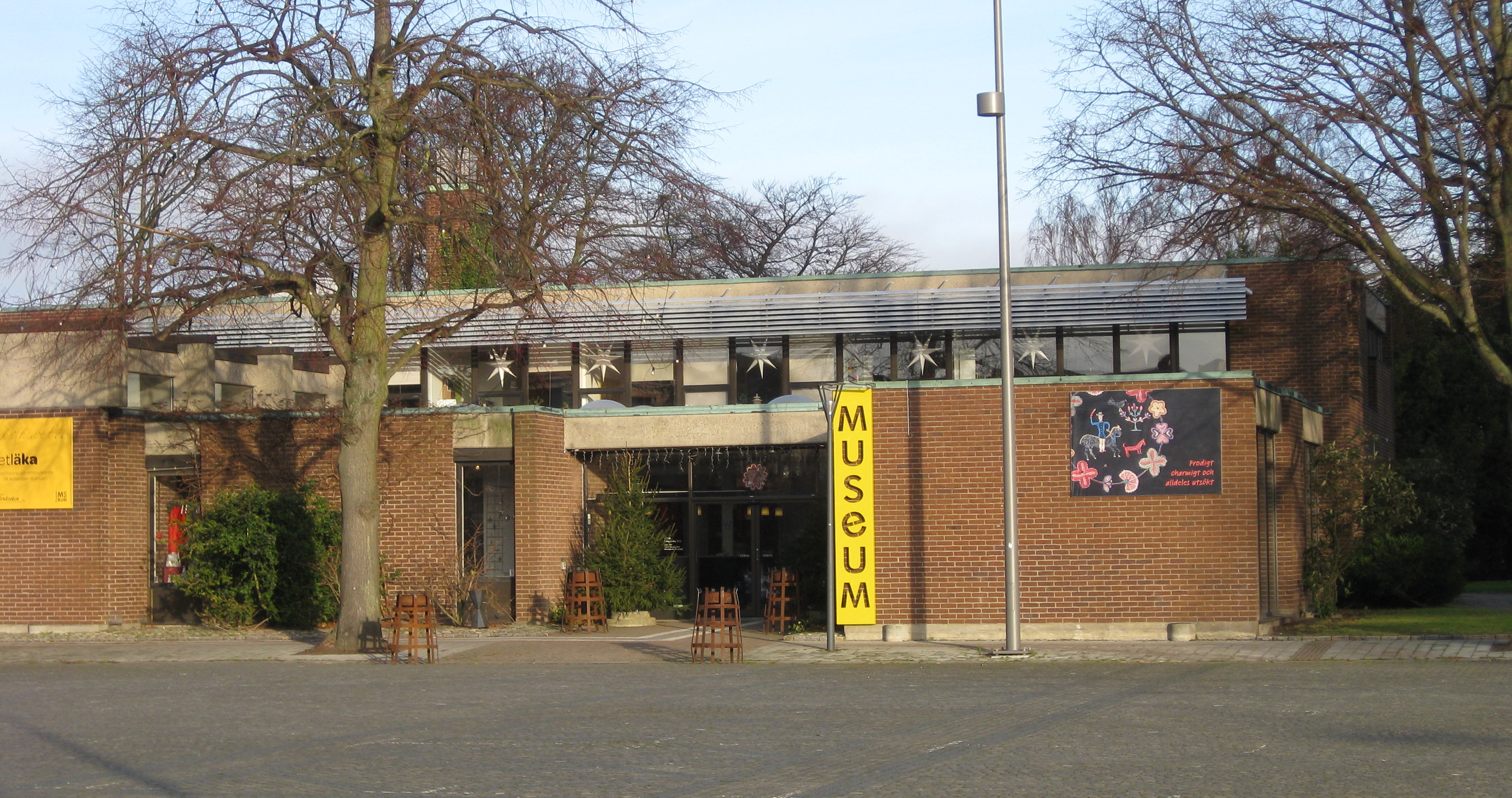
Trelleborgs Museum

== Twin cities ==
Trelleborg is twinned with:

- Sassnitz, Germany

== See also ==
- Friary in Trelleborg
- Scania Market
- Ports of the Baltic Sea
