= Trelleborg Old Water Tower =

Building in Trelleborg, Sweden

Coordinates: 55°22′32.56″N 13°9′31.25″E

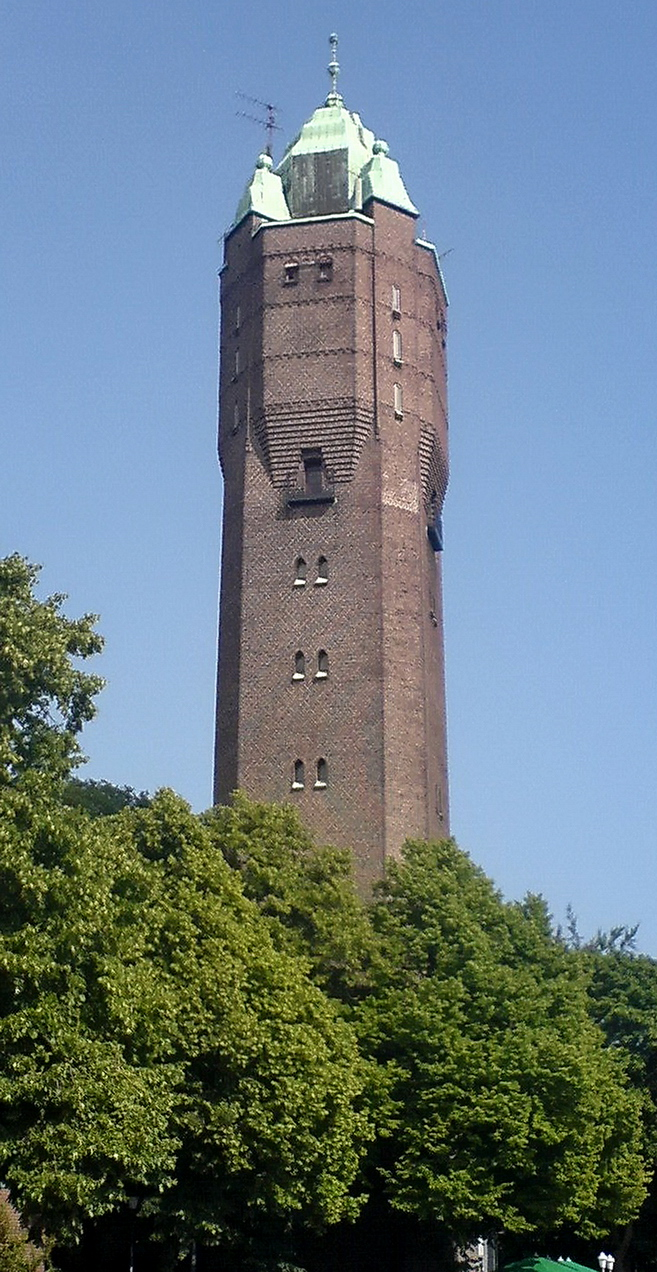
Trelleborg Old Water Tower

Trelleborg Old Water Tower is a now defunct water tower in Stadsparken, Trelleborg in southern Sweden.

The erection of the water tower was initiated 1911 after drawings by the architect Ivar Tengbom, and was finished 1912. Since the town of Trelleborg lies in flat surroundings the tower had to be tall; it is 58 metres (190 ft) tall and is the largest building in Trelleborg. The uppermost three meters of the building is a copper-plated spire, a spire decorated by two spheres – one being 40 centimetres (16 in) in diameter, the other 60 centimetres (24 in) in diameter. The cistern could contain 300 cubic metres (11,000 cu ft) of water, its top was 42 metres (138 ft) above the ground, and the beams on which the cistern rested were 32 metres (105 ft) above the ground. The water tower was in use until 1974, when Trelleborg New Water Tower took over its functions. Except a café at street level the water tower stands unused.
