= TMEM131 =

Protein-coding gene in the species Homo sapiens

Identifiers
- Aliases: TMEM131, CC28, PRO1048, RW1, YR-23, transmembrane protein 131
- External IDs: OMIM: 615659; MGI: 1927110; GeneCards: TMEM131

Gene location (Human)
Chr.	Chromosome 2 (human)
Band	2q11.2	Start	97,756,333 bp
Band	2q11.2	End	97,995,948 bp

Gene location (Mouse)
Chr.	Chromosome 1 (mouse)
Band	1 B|1 15.42 cM	Start	36,831,272 bp
Band	1 B|1 15.42 cM	End	36,982,747 bp
RNA expression pattern
Bgee	Human / Mouse (ortholog); Top expressed in: bronchial epithelial cell; mucosa of sigmoid colon; jejunal mucosa; tibia; mucosa of paranasal sinus; skin of hip; skin of thigh; trabecular bone; pylorus; hair follicle / Top expressed in: human fetus; submandibular gland; fetal liver hematopoietic progenitor cell; genital tubercle; tail of embryo; migratory enteric neural crest cell; left colon; abdominal wall; skin of external ear; Paneth cell; More reference expression data
BioGPS	n/a
Gene ontology
Molecular function	molecular function
Cellular component	membrane; integral component of membrane; cellular component
Biological process	biological process
Sources:Amigo / QuickGO
Orthologs
Databases	NCBI: entry; OMA: entry
Species	Human	Mouse
Entrez	23505	56030
Ensembl	ENSG00000075568	ENSMUSG00000026116
UniProt	Q92545	O70472
RefSeq (mRNA)	NM_015348; NM_018497	NM_018872
RefSeq (protein)	NP_056163	NP_061360
Location (UCSC)	Chr 2: 97.76 – 98 Mb	Chr 1: 36.83 – 36.98 Mb
PubMed search
- Wikidata
View/Edit Human	View/Edit Mouse

Transmembrane protein 131 (TMEM131) is a protein that is encoded by the TMEM131 gene in humans. The TMEM131 protein contains three domains of unknown function 3651 (DUF3651) and two transmembrane domains. This protein has been implicated as having a role in T cell function and development. TMEM131 also resides in a locus (2q11.1) that is associated with Nievergelt's Syndrome when deleted.

== Role In T Cell Function ==
TMEM131 has been shown to exhibit hypermethylation in patients with Down syndrome. The authors of this study proposed that, given TMEM131s supposed function in T cell development and function, this hypermethylation may play a role in the suppressed immune function in patients with Down Syndrome.

TMEM131 has also been shown to be up-regulated during the development and differentiation of T cells, and has been shown to have relatively high levels of expression in T cells relative to other tissue types.

== Gene ==
=== Overview ===
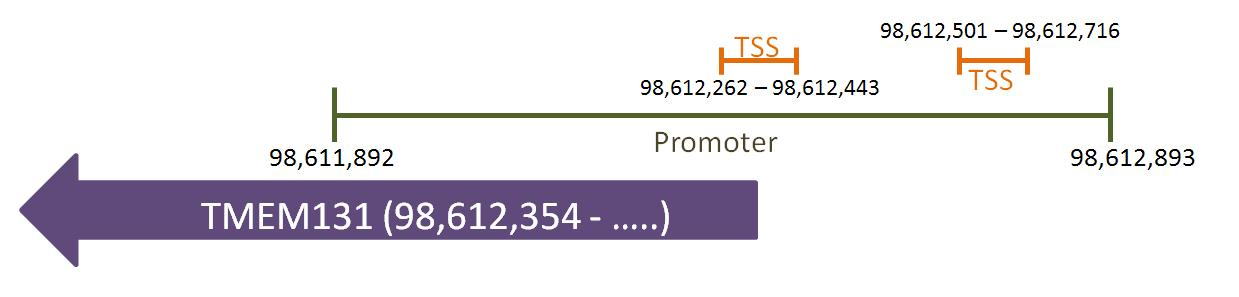
Predicted promoter sequence layout as well as potential transcriptional start sites (TSS) as predicted by the Genomatix El Dorado tool.

TMEM131 is located on the negative DNA strand (see Sense) of chromosome 2 from 98,372,799 - 98,612,354. The gene product is a 6,657 base pair mRNA with 41 predicted exons in the human gene. Ensembl predicts ten alternative splice forms, four of which are protein coding. Promoter prediction and analysis was carried out using El Dorado through the Genomatix software page. The predicted promoter region spans 1002 base pairs from 98,611,892 through 98,612,893 on the minus strand of chromosome 2. The program predicted two potential transcriptional start locations. The first spans 216 base pairs from 98,612,501 through 98,612,716. The second spans 182 base pairs from 98,612,262 through 98,612,443.

=== Gene Neighborhood ===
TMEM131 is located directly adjacent to the ZAP70 gene (98,330,331 - 98,356,323) on the positive DNA strand, as well as numerous pseudogenes at the 2q11.2 locus. A Von Willebrand factor containing gene (VWA3B) is located upstream from TMEM131 on the positive strand (98,703,595 - 98,929,410).

=== Gene Expression ===
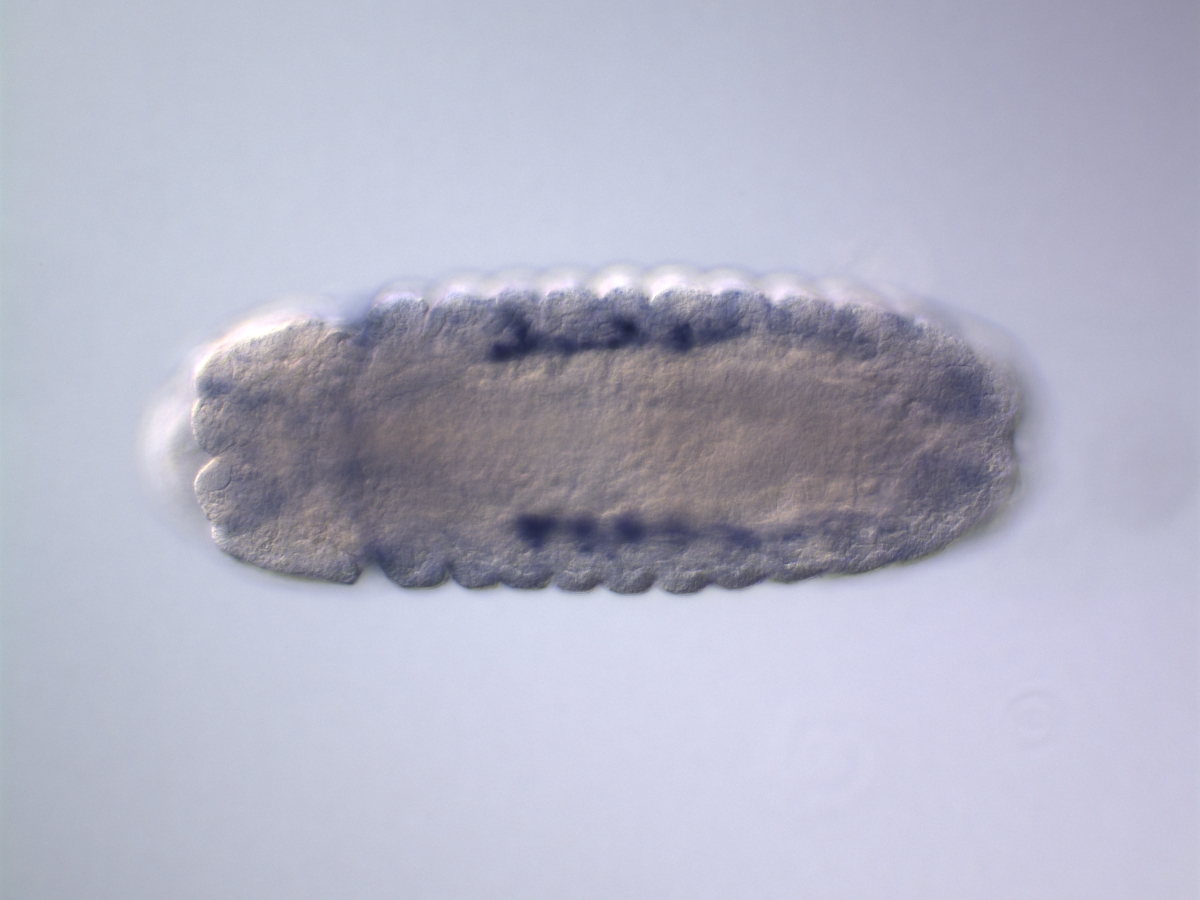
Example of in situ hybridization data available from BDGP (stage 11 shown).

TMEM131 is expressed in low to moderate levels throughout most of the body, with slightly increased levels occurring in the lymph nodes, uterus and T cells. Expression data in developing fruit fly embryos is available from the BDGP in situ homepage.

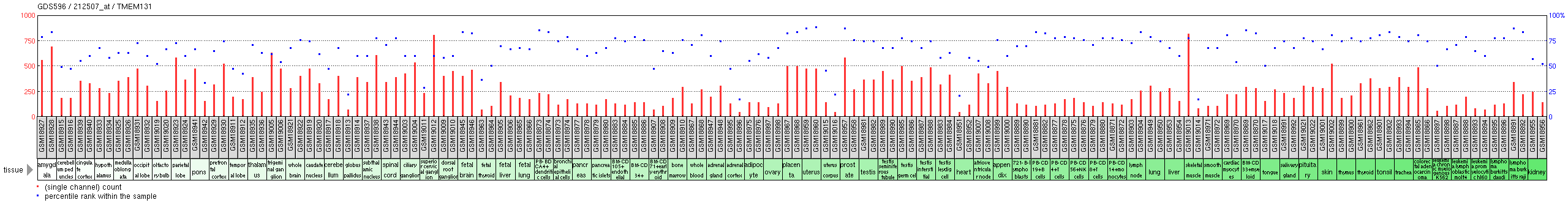
Expression profile from 79 physiologically normal tissues obtained from various sources for TMEM131.

== Protein ==
=== Properties/Characteristics ===
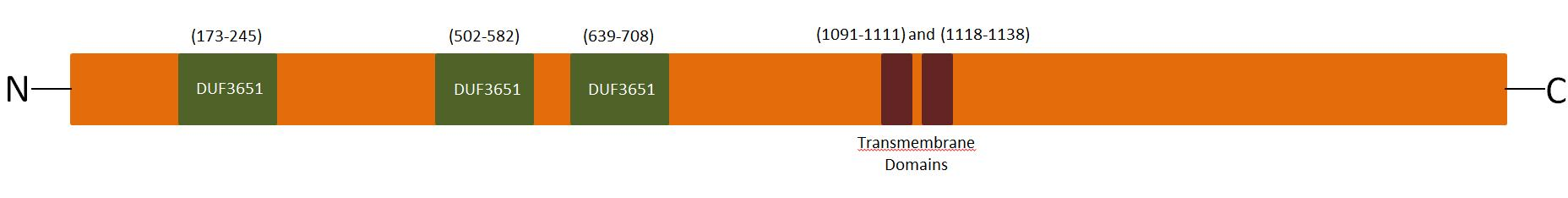
Schematic representation of the TMEM131 protein.

The primary function of the TMEM131 protein is not well understood. The human form has 1883 amino acid residues, with an isoelectric point of 8.74 and a molecular mass of 205,100 daltons. It has been shown to contain two transmembrane domains at residues 1,091-1,111 and 1,118-1,138. Three DUF3651 regions are located on the N-terminal side of the two adjacent transmembrane domains. These are located at residues 173-245, 502-582, and 639-708. The intercellular location of the protein has not been experimentally determined, but it is thought to reside in either the plasma membrane or endoplasmic reticulum, with each domain on both the N-terminal and C-terminal sides of the transmembrane regions being cytosolic. It contains numerous phosphorylation sites which have been shown both experimentally and with bioinformatic tools. Bioinformatic analysis of the protein using the NetPhos tool predicted 145 potential phosphorylation sites throughout the entire length of the protein.

=== Protein Interactions ===
Protein interaction analysis for TMEM131 has been carried out using computational tools. No interactions were identified through the MINT database. A STRING search revealed ten possible protein interactions through text mining, although none of these should be considered actual protein-protein interactions. Closer analysis of the results shows very little potential for these predictions to be real. The IntAct tool was also used, and this revealed a potential interaction had been found with Superoxide dismutase 2 (SOD2), which had been identified in a yeast Two-hybrid screening study.

== Conservation ==
=== Orthologs ===
TMEM131 is conserved throughout all of its orthologs. The entire protein is highly conserved in primate orthologs, while conservation is high within the DUF3651 and transmembrane regions in the more distant homologs.

Orthologs were found in species as distantly related to Humans as the Choanoflagellate Monosiga brevicollis using BLAST and the ALIGN tool through the San Diego Super Computer Biology Workbench. The following table gives information on the homologs of TMEM131.

Genus Species	Organism Common Name	Divergence from Humans (MYA)	NCBI Protein Accession Number	Sequence identity	Protein Length	Common Gene Name
Homo sapiens	Humans	--	NP_056163.1	100%	1883	TMEM131
Pan troglodytes	Common Chimp	6.2	XP_515638.2	99.6%	1883	TMEM131
Bos taurus	Cattle	96.6	XP_613474	92.1%	1876	TMEM131
Mus musculus	Mouse	94.5	NP_061360.2	89.7%	1877	TMEM131
Monodelphis domestica	Opossum	170.0	XM_001367646.2	81.3%	1840	TMEM131
Gallus gallus	Chicken	323.0	XM_001233588.2	76.3%	1821	TMEM131
Xenopus tropicalis	Frog	359.0	NP_001135552	70.3%	1877	TMEM131
Danio rerio	Zebra Fish	436.8	XP_001923340.1	59.6%	1799	Predicted: TMEM131
Caenorhabditis elegans	Nematode	274.8	NP_498059.2	24.1%	1831	Hypothetical Protein C27F2.8
Drosophila melanogaster	Fruit Fly	725.5	NP_611073.2	24.0%	1567	CG8370
Monosiga brevicollis	Choanoflagellate	856.0	XP_001744482.1	21.2%	1781	Hypothetical Protein

=== Paralog ===
TMEM131 has a single paralog, TMEM131L or KIAA0922. This gene is very similar to TMEM131, but it does not include the second two of the three DUF3651 regions.
