= Trelleborgs Museum =

Museum in Trelleborg, Sweden

Coordinates: 55.3760°N 13.1581°E

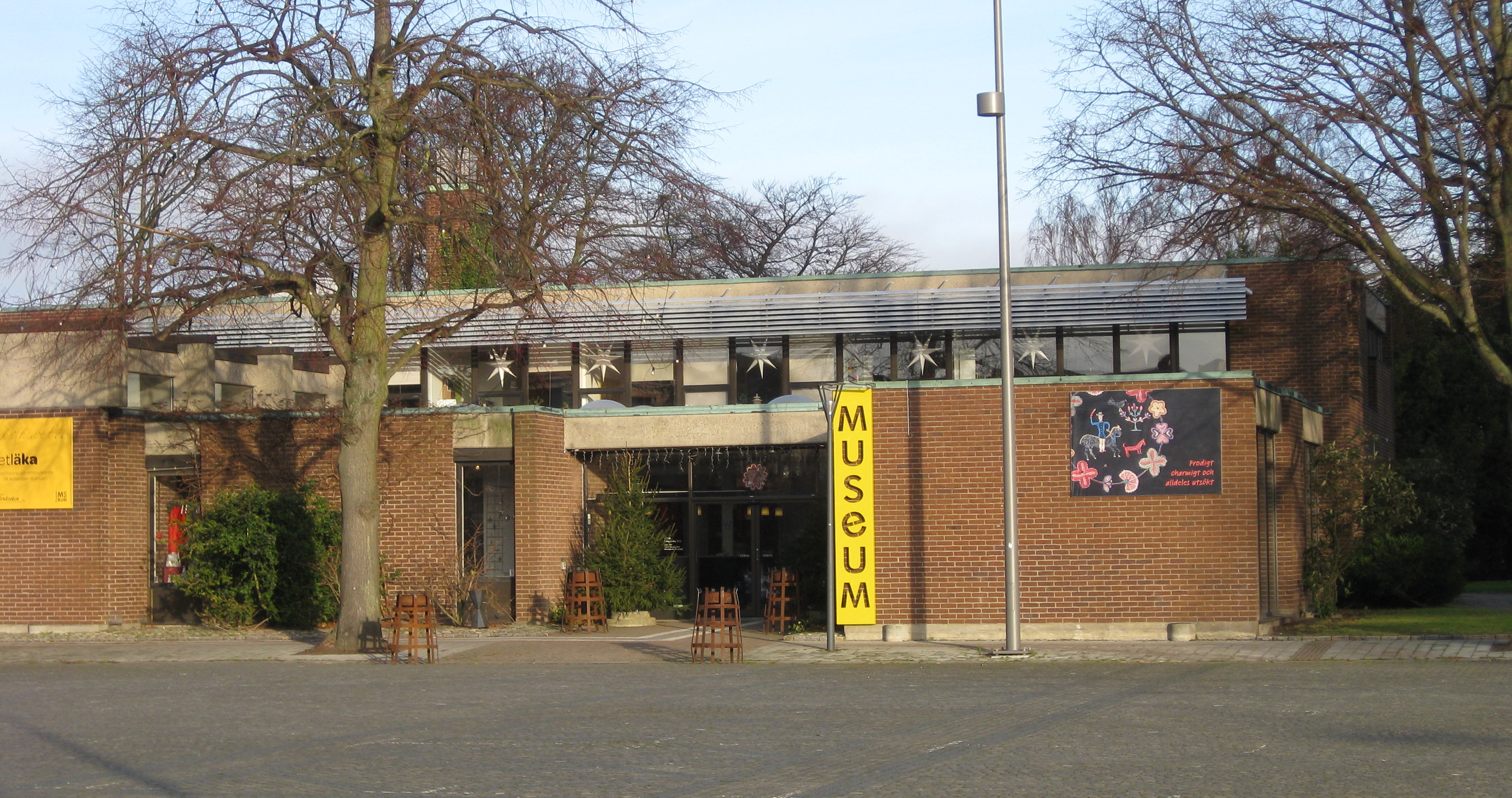
Trelleborgs Museum entrance

Trelleborgs Museum is a museum in the city of Trelleborg in southern Sweden. The museum focuses on local history. The museum particularly exhibits a reconstruction of a Viking longhouse, and a reconstruction of a late Scandinavian Hunter-Gatherer from circa 7,000 BP, whose remains were found in the archaeological site of Skateholm, near Trelleborg.

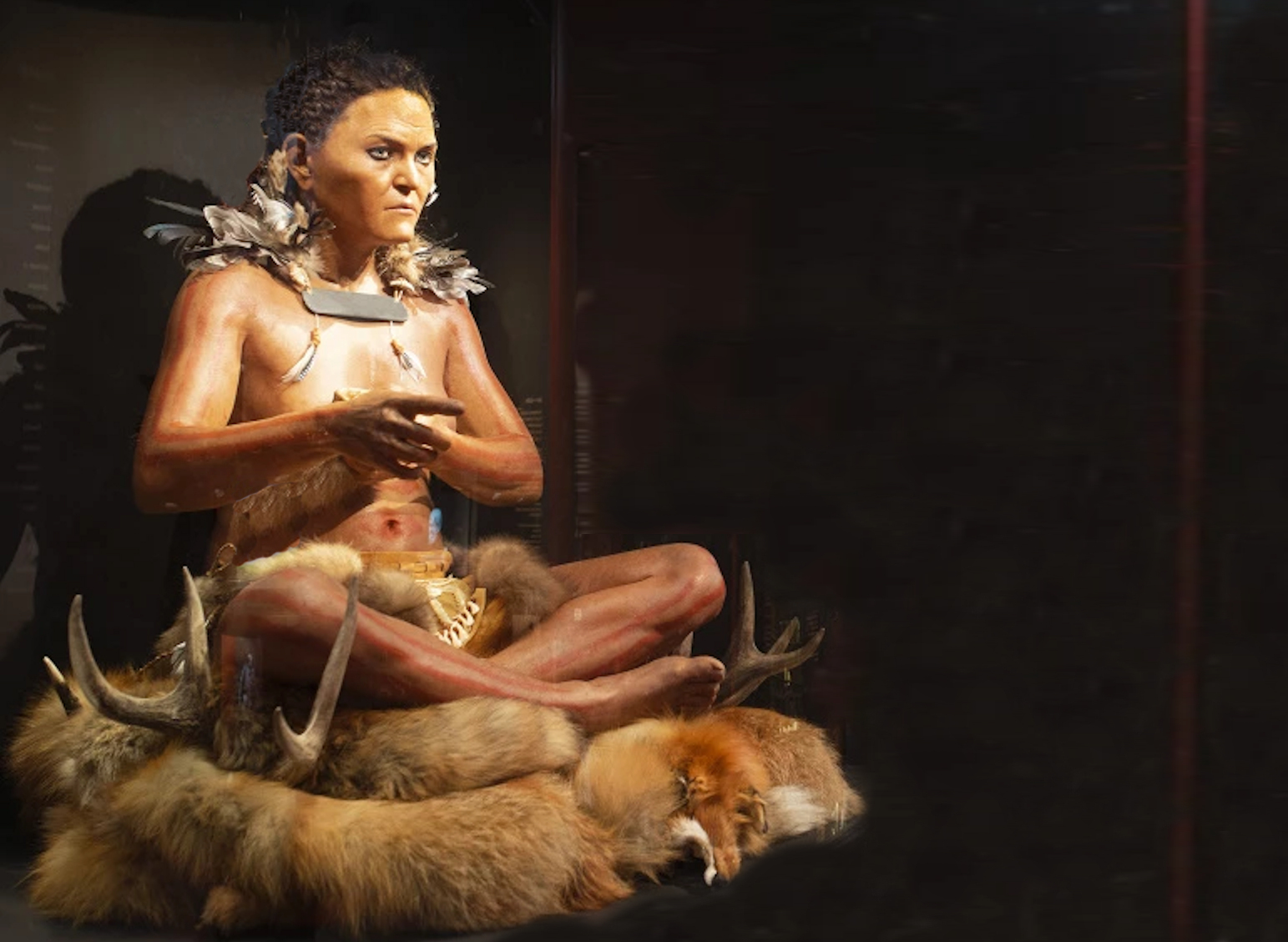
A late Scandinavian Hunter-Gatherer dated circa 7,000 BP, from Skateholm, near Trelleborg in southwest Sweden. Reconstruction by Oscar Nilsson, Trelleborgs Museum.

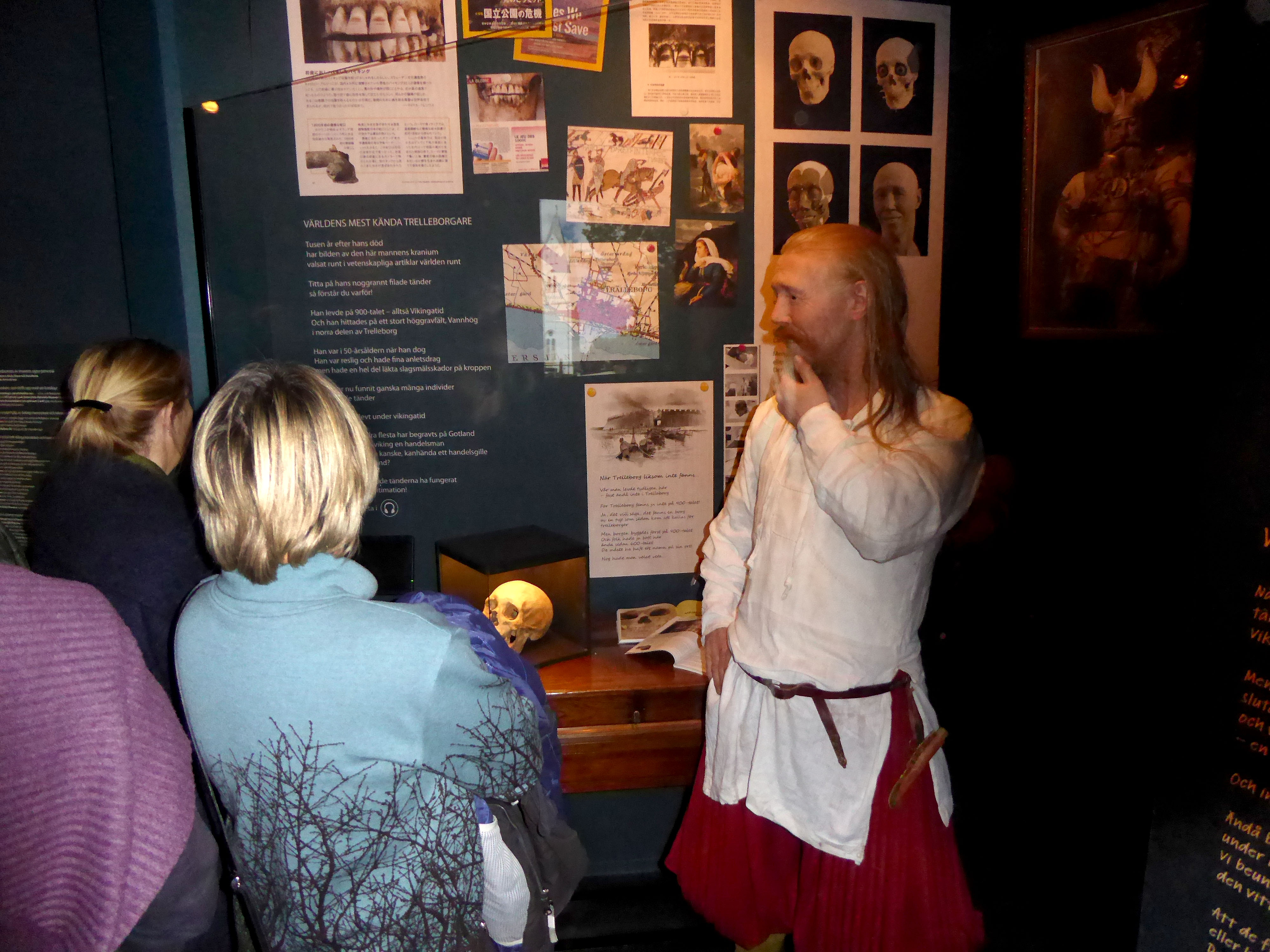
An exhibit
