= TMEM131L =

Protein-coding gene in the species Homo sapiens

Identifiers
- Aliases: TMEM131L, D930015E06Rik, Kiaa0922, mKIAA0922, KIAA0922, transmembrane 131 like
- External IDs: OMIM: 616243; MGI: 2443399; GeneCards: TMEM131L

Gene location (Human)
Chr.	Chromosome 4 (human)
Band	4q31.3	Start	153,466,346 bp
Band	4q31.3	End	153,636,711 bp

Gene location (Mouse)
Chr.	Chromosome 3 (mouse)
Band	3|3 F1	Start	83,804,962 bp
Band	3|3 F1	End	83,947,482 bp
RNA expression pattern
Bgee	Human / Mouse (ortholog); Top expressed in: secondary oocyte; body of pancreas; white blood cell; monocyte; granulocyte; bone marrow; blood; spleen; trabecular bone; lymph node / Top expressed in: ventricular zone; genital tubercle; ganglionic eminence; maxillary prominence; spleen; mandibular prominence; thymus; tail of embryo; hair follicle; internal carotid artery; More reference expression data
BioGPS	n/a
Orthologs
Databases	NCBI: entry; OMA: entry
Species	Human	Mouse
Entrez	23240	229473
Ensembl	ENSG00000121210	ENSMUSG00000033767
UniProt	A2VDJ0; H0Y2M0	Q3U3D7
RefSeq (mRNA)	NM_001131007; NM_015196	NM_172681; NM_001399526
RefSeq (protein)	NP_001124479; NP_056011	NP_766269; NP_001386455
Location (UCSC)	Chr 4: 153.47 – 153.64 Mb	Chr 3: 83.8 – 83.95 Mb
PubMed search
- Wikidata
View/Edit Human	View/Edit Mouse

Transmembrane protein 131-like (TMEM131L protein), alternatively named uncharacterized protein KIAA0922 (KIAA0922 protein), is an integral transmembrane protein encoded by the human gene KIAA0922 that is significantly conserved in eukaryotes, at least through protists. Although the function of this gene is not yet fully elucidated, initial microarray evidence suggests that it may be involved in immune responses. Furthermore, its paralog, prolyl endopeptidase (PREP) whose function is known, provides clues as to the function of TMEM131L.

== Gene ==
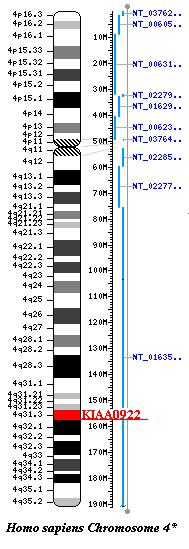
KIAA0922 Labelled on Annotated Chromosome 4. (Original image from NCBI Map View, edited to highlight KIAA0922 location)

The KIAA0922 gene is found in the human genome at chromosomal location 4q31.3 on the plus strand and is 170,364 base pairs (bp) in length, spanning from 154,387,498 to 154,557,863 along chromosome 4 (NC_000004.11). The gene has the aliases TMEM131L, FLJ10592, DKFZp586H1322, and LOC23240 The gene includes 44 distinct introns (with an additional 6 probable non-overlapping alternative last exons). The function of this gene is not yet fully understood.

The gene includes the Domain of unknown function 3651 (DUF3651) which is part of the transmembrane associated family pfam12371 and of the superfamily cl13764. The mature mRNA of certain transcript variants have a confirmed signal peptide region. although protein localization remains unknown.

== mRNA ==
KIAA0922 mRNA is around 5 kilo-base pairs(kbp) in length. Thirteen splice variants are supported by ACEVIEW analysis but only two have been experimentally identified. Mostly, different variants seem to vary based on differing truncation of the 3' and 5' ends (especially due to the presence of an upstream stop codon in the exonic region).

== Protein ==
Protein TMEM131L is an integral membrane protein and is also known as OTTHUMP00000205136. The protein TMEM131L Isoform I is 1,610 amino acids in length and its primary structure weighs 179.209 kilo-Dalton (unit) (kDa). Twelve different isoforms of this protein have been predicted (one partial, six COOH complete, and five complete) however there have been only 5 experimentally observed.

=== Expression ===
The protein TMEM131L shows highest levels of expression in immune related cells and tissues such as lymphocytes and bone marrow. Levels of TMEM131L protein have been shown to significantly increase under certain immune responses, such as increasing over time after introduction of measles virus to the immune cells dendritic cells and in peripheral blood lymphocytes from kidney transplants displaying acute rejection.

=== Transmembrane region ===
There is only one confirmed transmembrane domain region in protein TMEM131L. This domain exists near the center of the protein, at 871-891 amino acid of the 1610 amino acid long protein sequence (for isoform I).

There is a dramatic switch from hydrophobic to hydrophilic amino acid density at this confirmed transmembrane region. There is also a switch to a higher density of predicted N-linked glycosylation sites across this confirmed transmembrane region (0.0136 to 0.0069 predicted N-glycosylation sites/amino acid) at this region. Furthermore, the only confirmed phosphorylation site is on the latter half of the protein (1,123 aa in isoform I) and predicted phosphorylation sites increase in density across the confirmed transmembrane region (from 0.0386 to 0.0905 predicted phosphorylation sites/amino acid). These results together indicate that the first half of the protein (1-871 aa of isoform I) is outside of the membrane while the second half (891-1610 aa of isoform I) is inside of the membrane, although experimentation is necessary to confirm this deduction.

== Paralogs ==
=== Prolyl endopeptidase ===
The enzyme prolyl endopeptidase (PREP) is 13.4% identical to transmembrane protein 131L. PREP acts in the cytosol by cleaving peptide bonds on the C-terminus of short prolyl residues (approx. 30 amino acids long). PREP has been found to be involved with the maturation and degradation of neuropeptides and peptide hormones. PREP and its general functions are conserved through flavobateria.

Of particular interest, the highest areas of amino acid conservation between PREP and KIAA0922 are the areas most conserved in KIAA0922 (#Conservation) are the esterase lipase region (483...706) and peptidase S9 N region (7...423)

This connection may help direct the efforts to elucidate the function of transmembrane protein 131L.

=== Transmembrane protein 131 ===
Transmembrane protein 131L is 36% identical and 54% similar to transmembrane protein 131. The gene for transmembrane protein 131 is found on chromosomal location 2q11.2 and the protein is 1883 amino acids long and is also an integral membrane protein. However, research indicates that the TMEM131L protein is more highly methylated than the TMEM protein.

== Conservation ==
Divergence of KIAA0922 protein amino acid conservation over time to show high conservation of a significant portion of the KIAA0922 protein. (Percent identity and percent similarity values for orthologs found using NCBI Blast and SDSC Biology Workbench CLUSTALW. *Time since divergence is based on values estimated by the bioinformatics tool TimeTree.org)

Following Biology Workbench multialign CLUSTAL W analyses, certain regions of TMEM131L protein are highly conserved through Eukaryotes as distantly as single-celled protists (24% identity with Dictyostelium fasciculatum). These exact same regions also appear to be conserved in the KIAA0922 paralog Prolyl endopeptidase (PREP), a gene for a cytosolic enzyme that cleaves the C-terminus of short polyl proteins.

Genus and species name	Common name	mRNA Accession Number	Sequence length (amino acids)	Sequence Identity to human mRNA	Sequence Similarity to human mRNA
Homo sapiens	Humans	NM_001131007.1	1624		
Pongo abelii	Sumatran orangutan	XP_002815269.1	1608	98%	99%
Loxodonta africana	Elephant	XP_003417575.1	1610	86%	92%
Mus musculus	Mouse	NP_766269.3	1597	77%	86%
Ornithorhynchus anatinus	Platypus	XP_001514395.2	1609	71%	82%
Gallus gallus	Chicken	XP_420366.3	1610	63%	79%
Anolis carolinensis	Carolina anole	XP_003221762.1	1606	61%	75%
Xenopus tropicalis	Western clawed toad	XP_002933525.1	1610	48%	65%
Oreochromis niloticus	Nile tilapia	XP_003444335.1	1755	36%	53%
Drosophila melanogaster	Fruit fly	NP_611073.2	1567	30%	51%
Dictyostelium fasciculatum	Dictyostelium (unicellular protist)	EGG18468.1	2317	26%	52%
Polysphondylium pallidum	Slime mold	EFA75514.1	1234	24%	42%
