= Netherlands =

Country in Northwestern Europe and the Caribbean

Netherlands Nederland (Dutch)
- Constituent country in the Kingdom of the Netherlands
- Flag Coat of arms
- Motto: Je maintiendrai (French) ("I will maintain")
- Anthem: Wilhelmus (Dutch) ("William")
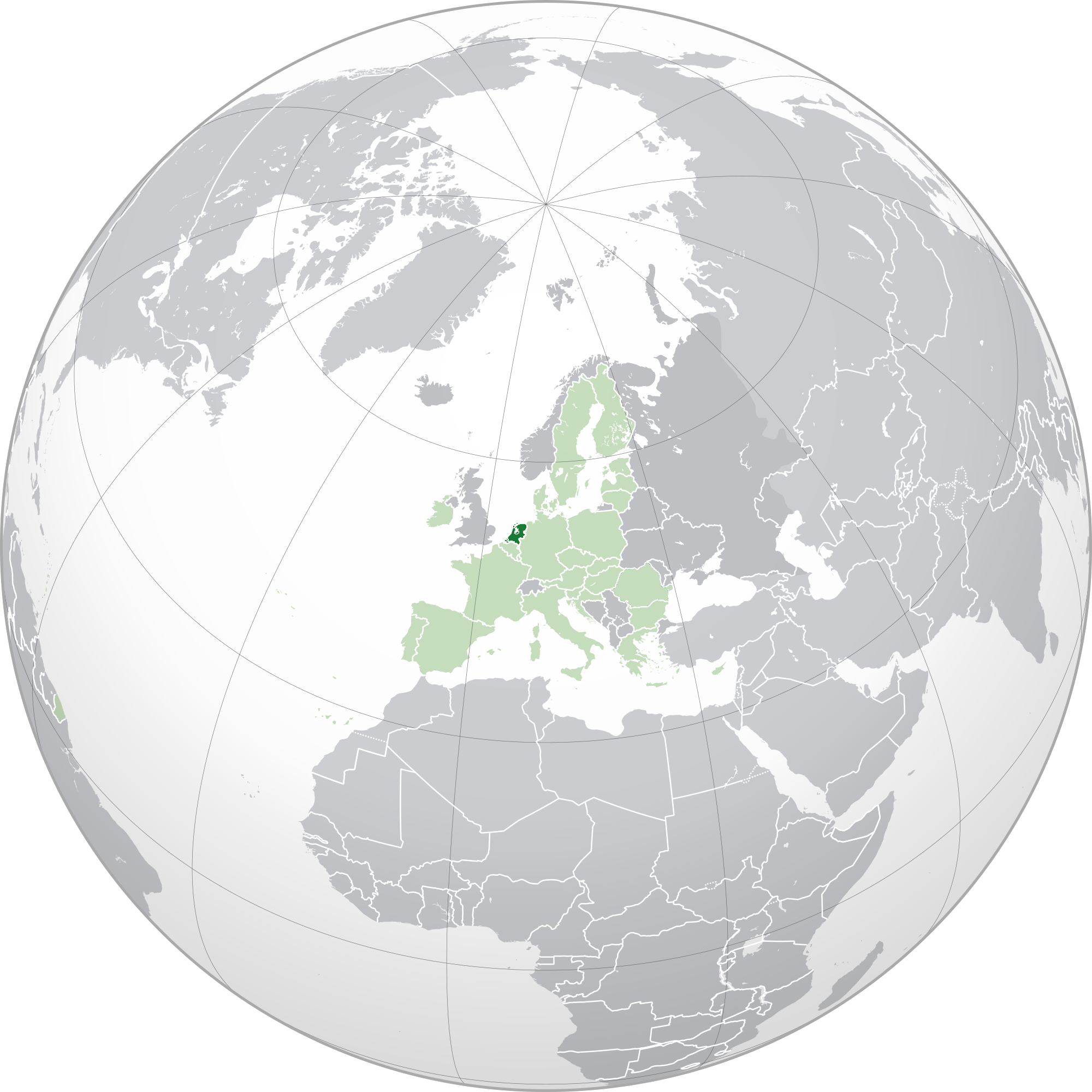
- Location of Netherlands (dark green) – in Europe (light green & dark grey) – in the European Union (light green)
- Sovereign state: Kingdom of the Netherlands
- Before independence: Spanish Netherlands
- Act of Abjuration: 26 July 1581
- Peace of Münster: 30 January 1648
- United Kingdom of the Netherlands: 16 March 1815
- Liberation Day: 5 May 1945
- Kingdom Charter: 15 December 1954
- Caribbean reorganisation: 10 October 2010
- Capital and largest city: Amsterdam (Note: Amsterdam is the constitutional capital, while the government and the royal family are seated in The Hague.); 52°22′N 4°53′E
- Government seat: The Hague
- Official languages: Dutch
- Recognised regional languages: West Frisian; Papiamento; English (Note: Apart from Dutch, English is an official language in the special municipalities of Saba and Sint Eustatius, Papiamentu is an official language in the special municipality of Bonaire, and West Frisian is an official language in the province of Friesland.)
- Minority languages: Dutch Low Saxon; Dutch Sign Language; Limburgish; Sinte Romani; Yiddish (Note: Having ratified the European Charter for Regional or Minority Languages in 1996, the Dutch government recognises Dutch Low Saxon, Limburgish, Sinte Romani and Yiddish as regional or non-territorial minority languages. On 1 July 2021, Dutch Sign Language received the status of recognised language.)
- Ethnic groups (2024): 72.0% Dutch (Note: This includes residents who were born in the Netherlands and whose parents both were born in the Netherlands.); 9.2% other European; 2.5% Turkish; 2.3% Moroccan; 2.0% Indonesian; 2.0% Surinamese; 1.1% Dutch Caribbean; 8.9% other
- Religion (2025): 58% no religion; 28% Christianity; 16% Catholicism; 12% Protestantism; 6% Islam; 7% other
- Demonym(s): Dutch
- Government: Unitary parliamentary constitutional monarchy
  - Monarch: Willem-Alexander
  - Prime Minister: Rob Jetten
- Legislature: States General
  - Upper house: Senate
  - Lower house: House of Representatives

European Parliament
  - Netherlands constituency: 31 seats

Area
  - Total: 41,865 (Note: The area of the Netherlands with overseas territories. European Netherlands is 41,543 square kilometers.) km^{2} (16,164 sq mi) (134th)
  - Water (%): 18.41
- Highest elevation (Mount Scenery (Note: Caribbean part; Vaalserberg in the European part is 322.4 m (1057.7 ft) high)): 870 m (2,850 ft)

Population
  - 2026 census: ▲18,130,208 (70th)
  - Density: 541/km^{2} (1,401.2/sq mi) (26th)
- GDP (PPP): 2026 estimate
  - Total: ▲$1.599 trillion (29th)
  - Per capita: ▲$88,202 (10th)
- GDP (nominal): 2026 estimate
  - Total: ▲$1.424 trillion (18th)
  - Per capita: ▲$78,535 (10th)
- Gini (2025): ▼25.9 low
- HDI (2023): ▲0.955 very high · 8th
- Currency: Euro (€) (EUR); United States dollar (US$) (USD) (Note: The euro is used in the European part of the Netherlands and replaced the Dutch guilder in 2002. The United States dollar is used in the Caribbean Netherlands and replaced the Netherlands Antillean guilder in 2011.)
- Time zone: UTC+01:00 (CET); UTC−04:00 (AST); (Note: CET and CEST are used in the European Netherlands, and AST is used in the Caribbean Netherlands.)
  - Summer (DST): UTC+02:00 (CEST); UTC−04:00 (AST)
- Date format: dd-mm-yyyy (Note: See Date and time notation in the Netherlands)
- Calling code: +31, +599 (Note: +599 was the country code designated for the now dissolved Netherlands Antilles. The Caribbean Netherlands still use +599 7 (for Bonaire), +599 3 (for Sint Eustatius), and +599 4 (for Saba).)
- Internet TLD: .nl, .bq (Note: .nl is the common internet top-level domain name for the Netherlands. The .eu domain is also used, as it is shared with other European Union member states. .bq is designated, but not in use, for the Caribbean Netherlands.)

The Netherlands, (Note: Dutch: Nederland [ˈneːdərlɑnt]) also informally known as Holland, is a country in Northwestern Europe, with overseas territories in the Caribbean. It is the largest of the four constituent countries of the Kingdom of the Netherlands. The Netherlands consists of twelve provinces and three overseas special municipalities. European Netherlands has land borders with Germany to the east and with Belgium to the south, and a coastline to the north and west. It shares maritime borders with the United Kingdom, Germany, and Belgium in the North Sea. The official language is Dutch, with West Frisian as a secondary official language in the province of Friesland. Dutch, English, and Papiamento are official languages in the Caribbean territories. People from the Netherlands are referred to as Dutch.

Netherlands literally means "lower countries", in reference to its low elevation and flat topography, 26% of which is below sea level. Most of the areas below sea level, known as polders, are the result of land reclamation that began in the 14th century. The Dutch Republic experienced major political, economic, and cultural development; this period is commonly known as the Dutch Golden Age. During this time, its trading companies, the Dutch East India Company and the Dutch West India Company, established multiple colonies and trading posts. While neutral in the First World War, the Netherlands was invaded and occupied by Nazi Germany in 1940 during the Second World War, which lasted until the end of the war in 1945.

With a population of over 18 million people, all living within a total area of 41,850 km^{2} (16,160 sq mi)—of which the land area is 33,500 km^{2} (12,900 sq mi)—the Netherlands is the 15th most densely populated country, with a density of 433 people per square kilometre (1,120 people/sq mi). Nevertheless, it is the world's second largest exporter of food and agricultural products by value, owing to its fertile soil, mild climate, intensive agriculture, and inventiveness. The four largest cities are Amsterdam, Rotterdam, The Hague and Utrecht. Amsterdam is most populous city and the nominal capital, though the primary national political institutions are in The Hague.

The Netherlands has been a parliamentary constitutional monarchy with a unitary structure since 1848. The country has a tradition of pillarisation (separation of citizens into groups by religion and political beliefs) and a long record of social tolerance, having legalised prostitution and euthanasia, along with maintaining a liberal drug policy. The Netherlands allowed women's suffrage in 1919 and was the first country to legalise same-sex marriage in 2001. A developed country, its mixed-market advanced economy is the 18th-largest in the world and has the 11th-highest per capita income globally. The Hague holds the seat of the States General, cabinet, and Supreme Court. The Port of Rotterdam is the busiest in Europe. Schiphol is the busiest airport in the Netherlands and the fourth busiest in Europe. The Netherlands is a founding member of the European Union, eurozone, G10, NATO, OECD, and World Trade Organization, as well as a part of the Schengen Area and the trilateral Benelux Union. It hosts intergovernmental organisations and international courts, many of which are in The Hague.

== Etymology ==
=== Netherlands and the Low Countries ===
In most Romance languages, the term "Low Countries" is officially used as the name for the Netherlands. The countries that constitute the region called the Low Countries (Netherlands, Belgium, and Luxembourg) all have similar toponymy. Place names with Neder, Nieder, Nedre, Nether, Lage(r) or Low(er) (in Germanic languages) and Bas or Inferior (in Romance languages) are in use in low-lying places all over Europe. The Romans made a distinction between the Roman provinces of downstream Germania Inferior (nowadays part of Belgium and the Netherlands) and upstream Germania Superior. Thus, in the case of the Low Countries and the Netherlands, the geographical location of this lower region is more or less downstream and near the sea, compared to that of the upper region of Germania Superior. The designation 'low' returned in the 10th-century Duchy of Lower Lorraine, which covered much of the Low Countries.

The Dukes of Burgundy used the term les pays de par deçà ("the lands over here") for the Low Countries. Under Habsburg rule, this became pays d'embas ("lands down here"). This was translated as Neder-landen in contemporary Dutch official documents. From a regional point of view, Niderlant was also the area between the Meuse and the lower Rhine in the late Middle Ages. From the mid-16th century, the "Low Countries" and the "Netherlands" lost their original deictic meaning.

=== Holland ===
The term Holland has frequently been used informally to refer to the whole of the modern country of the Netherlands in various languages, including Dutch and English. In some languages, Holland is used as the formal name for the Netherlands. However, Holland is a region within the Netherlands that consists of the two provinces of North and South Holland. Formerly these were a single province, and earlier the County of Holland, which also included parts of present-day Utrecht province. The emphasis on Holland during the formation of the Dutch Republic, the Eighty Years' War, and the Anglo-Dutch wars in the 17th and 18th centuries made Holland a pars pro toto for the entire country.

Many Dutch people object to the country being referred to as Holland instead of the Netherlands, on much the same grounds as many Welsh or Scottish people object to the United Kingdom being referred to as England. In particular, those from regions other than Holland find it undesirable or misrepresentative to use the term Holland for the whole country, as the Holland region only comprises two of the twelve provinces, and 38% of Dutch citizens. As of 2019, the Dutch government officially has preferred the Netherlands over Holland when talking about the country.

Often Holland or Hollanders are used by the Flemish to refer to the Dutch in the Netherlands. The terms are used in a derogatory fashion by the Dutch living south of the great rivers (a natural cultural, social, and religious boundary formed by the rivers Rhine and Meuse) to refer to the Dutch in the north. In the southern province of Limburg, the term is used for the Dutch from the other 11 provinces.

=== Dutch ===
Dutch is used in English as the adjective for the Netherlands, as well as the demonym. The origins of the word go back to proto-Germanic *þiudiskaz (Latinised into Theodiscus), meaning "popular" or "of the people", the origin of Old Dutch *thiudisc and Old English þeodisc, meaning "(of) the common (Germanic) people". At first, the English language used Dutch to refer to any or all speakers of West Germanic languages. The term gradually came to be used more narrowly to refer to the West Germanic people with whom the English had the most contact.

== History ==
=== Prehistory (before 800 BC) ===
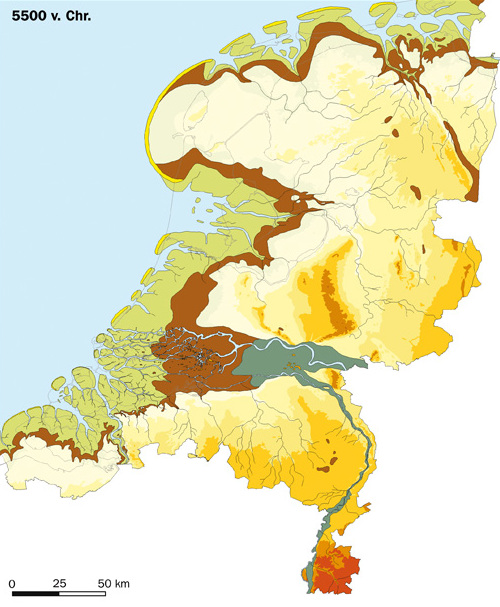
The Netherlands in 5500 BC

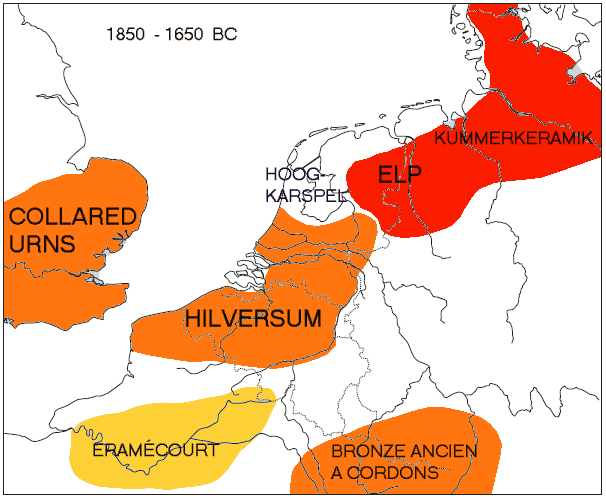
Bronze Age cultures in the Netherlands

The oldest human (Neanderthal) traces in the Netherlands, believed to be about 250,000 years old, were found near Maastricht. At the end of the Ice Age, the nomadic late Upper Palaeolithic Hamburg culture (13,000–10,000 BC) hunted reindeer in the area, using spears. The later Ahrensburg culture (11,200–9,500 BC) used bow and arrow. From Mesolithic Maglemosian-like tribes (c. 8000 BC), the world's oldest canoe was found in Drenthe.

Indigenous late Mesolithic hunter-gatherers from the Swifterbant culture (c. 5600 BC), related to the southern Scandinavian Ertebølle culture, were strongly linked to rivers and open water. Between 4800 and 4500 BC, the Swifterbant people started to adopt from the neighbouring Linear Pottery culture the practice of animal husbandry, and between 4300 and 4000 BC agriculture. The Funnelbeaker culture (4300–2800 BC) erected the dolmens, large stone grave monuments found in Drenthe. There was a quick transition from the Funnelbeaker farming culture to the pan-European pastoralist Corded Ware culture (c. 2950 BC). In the southwest, the Seine–Oise–Marne culture—related to the Vlaardingen culture (c. 2600 BC)—survived well into the Neolithic period, until it too was succeeded by the Corded Ware culture.

The subsequent Bell Beaker culture (2700–2100 BC) introduced metalwork in copper, gold and later bronze and opened new international trade routes, reflected in copper artefacts. Finds of rare bronze objects suggest that Drenthe was a trading centre in the Bronze Age (2000–800 BC). The Bell Beaker culture developed locally into the Barbed-Wire Beaker culture (2100–1800 BC) and later the Elp culture (1800–800 BC), a Middle Bronze Age culture marked by earthenware pottery. The southern region became dominated by the related Hilversum culture (1800–800 BC).

=== Celts, Germanic tribes and Romans (800 BC–410 AD) ===
From 800 BC onwards, the Iron Age Celtic Hallstatt culture became influential. Iron ore brought a measure of prosperity and was available throughout the country. Smiths travelled from settlement to settlement with bronze and iron, fabricating tools on demand. The King's grave of Oss (700 BC) was found in a burial mound, the largest of its kind in Western Europe.

The deteriorating climate in Scandinavia from 850 BC and 650 BC might have triggered the migration of Germanic tribes from the north. By the time this migration was complete, around 250 BC, a few general cultural and linguistic groups had emerged. The North Sea Germanic Ingaevones inhabited the northern part of the Low Countries. They would later develop into the Frisii and the early Saxons. The Weser–Rhine Germanic (or Istvaeones) extended along the middle Rhine and Weser and inhabited the Low Countries south of the great rivers. These tribes would eventually develop into the Salian Franks. The Celtic La Tène culture (c. 450 BC to the Roman conquest) expanded over a wide range, including the southern area of the Low Countries. Some scholars speculate that even a third ethnic identity and language, neither Germanic nor Celtic, survived in the Netherlands until the Roman period, the Nordwestblock culture.

The Rhine frontier around 70 AD

The first author to describe the coast of Holland and Flanders was the geographer Pytheas, who notes in c. 325 BC that in these regions, "more people died in the struggle against water than in the struggle against men." During the Gallic Wars, the area south and west of the Rhine was conquered by Roman forces under Julius Caesar from 57 BC to 53 BC. Caesar describes two main Celtic tribes living in what is now the southern Netherlands: the Menapii and the Eburones. Under Augustus, the Roman Empire conquered the entirety of the modern day Netherlands, incorporating it into the province of Germania Antiqua in 7 BC, and was repelled back across the Rhine after the Battle of Teutoburg Forest in AD 9; the Rhine became fixed as Rome's permanent northern frontier about AD 12. Notable towns at Nijmegen and Voorburg arose along the Limes Germanicus. In the first part of Gallia Belgica, the area south of the Limes became part of Germania Inferior. The area to the north of the Rhine, inhabited by the Frisii, remained outside Roman rule, while the Germanic border tribes of the Batavi and Cananefates served in the Roman cavalry. The Batavi revolted in 69 and were defeated. The Batavi later merged with other tribes into the confederation of the Salian Franks, whose identity emerged in the early 3rd century. Salian Franks appear in Roman texts as both allies and enemies. They were forced by the confederation of the Saxons from the east to move over the Rhine into Roman territory in the 4th century. From their base in West Flanders and the southwest Netherlands, they were raiding the English Channel. Roman forces pacified the region but did not expel the Franks, who continued to be feared at least until the time of Julian the Apostate (358) when Salian Franks were allowed to settle as foederati in Texandria.

=== Early Middle Ages (411–1000) ===
Franks, Frisians and Saxons, c. 716 AD

After the Roman government in the area collapsed around 406, the Franks expanded their territories into numerous kingdoms. By the 490s, Clovis I had conquered and united all these territories in the southern Netherlands in one Frankish kingdom and from there continued his conquests into Gaul. During this expansion, Franks migrating to the south (modern territory of France and Walloon part of Belgium) eventually adopted the Vulgar Latin of the local population. A widening cultural divide grew with the Franks remaining in their original homeland in the north (i.e. the southern Netherlands and Flanders), who kept on speaking Old Frankish, which by the 9th century had evolved into Old Low Franconian or Old Dutch. A Dutch-French language boundary hence came into existence.

Frankish expansion (481 to 870 AD)

To the north of the Franks, climatic conditions improved, and during the Migration Period the Angles, Jutes, and Frisii settled the coast. Many moved on to England and came to be known as Anglo-Saxons, but those who stayed would be referred to as Frisians and their language as Frisian. Frisian was spoken along the entire southern North Sea coast. By the 7th century, a Frisian Kingdom (650–734) under King Aldegisel and King Redbad emerged with Traiectum (Utrecht) as its centre of power, while Dorestad was a flourishing trading place. Between 600 and 719, the strategic cities and commercial hubs of the Rhine delta were fiercely contested by the Frisian Kingdom and the expanding Frankish Empire. In 734, at the Battle of the Boarn, the Frisians were defeated after a series of wars. With the approval of the Franks, the Anglo-Saxon missionary Willibrord converted the Frisian people to Christianity and established the Archdiocese of Utrecht. However, his successor Boniface was murdered by the Frisians in 754.

The Frankish Carolingian Empire controlled much of Western Europe. In 843, it was divided into three parts—East, Middle, and West Francia. Most of present-day Netherlands became part of Middle Francia, which was a weak kingdom and subject to numerous partitions and annexation attempts by its stronger neighbours. It comprised territories from Frisia in the north to the Kingdom of Italy in the south. Around 850, Lothair I of Middle Francia acknowledged the Viking Rorik of Dorestad as ruler of most of Frisia. When Middle Francia was partitioned in 855, the lands north of the Alps passed to Lothair II and subsequently were named Lotharingia. After he died in 869, Lotharingia was partitioned, into Upper and Lower Lotharingia, the latter comprising the Low Countries that became part of East Francia in 870. Around 879, another Viking expedition led by Godfrid, Duke of Frisia, raided the Frisian lands. Resistance to the Vikings, if any, came from local nobles who gained in stature as a result, and that laid the basis for the disintegration of Lower Lotharingia into semi-independent states. One of these local nobles was Gerolf of Holland, who assumed lordship in Frisia, and Viking rule came to an end.

=== High Middle Ages (1000–1384) ===
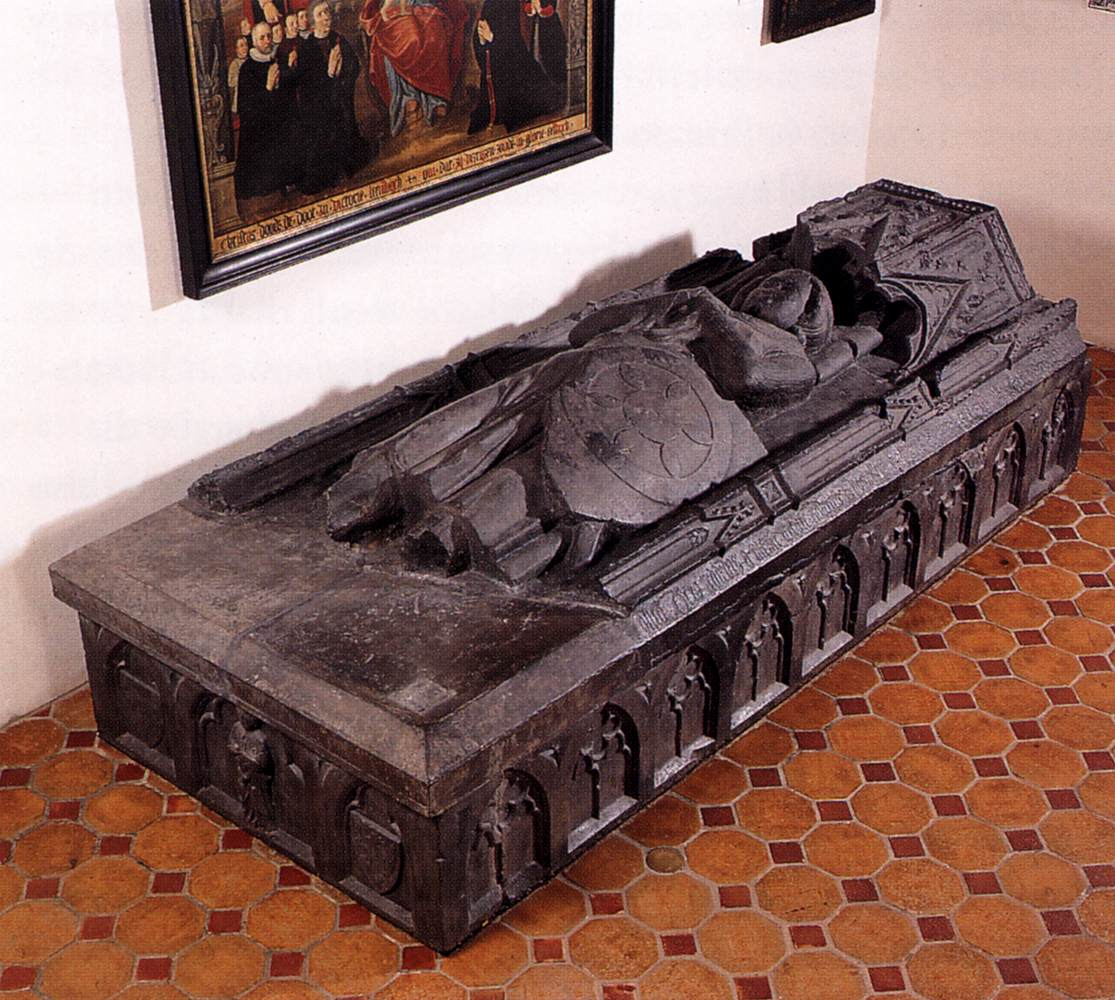
A medieval tomb of the Brabantian knight Arnold van der Sluijs

The Holy Roman Empire ruled much of the Low Countries in the 10th and 11th century but was not able to maintain political unity. Powerful local nobles turned their cities, counties and duchies into private kingdoms that felt little sense of obligation to the emperor. Holland, Hainaut, Flanders, Gelre, Brabant, and Utrecht were in a state of almost continual war or paradoxically formed personal unions. As Frankish settlement progressed from Flanders and Brabant, the area became Old Low Franconian (or Old Dutch).

By the 11th century agrarian conditions started to improve which led to increase in population, reclamation of wasteland by farmers, and steady growth of trade and industry. Towns grew around monasteries and castles, and a mercantile middle class began to develop in these urban areas, especially in Flanders and Brabant. Wealthy cities started to buy certain privileges for themselves from the sovereign.

By the 12th century farmers from Flanders and Utrecht began draining and cultivating uninhabited swampy land in the western Netherlands, making the emergence of the County of Holland as the centre of power possible. The title of Count of Holland was fought over in the Hook and Cod Wars between 1350 and 1490. The Cod faction consisted of the more progressive cities, while the Hook faction consisted of the conservative noblemen. These noblemen invited Duke Philip the Good of Burgundy to conquer Holland.

=== Burgundian, Habsburg and Spanish Habsburg Netherlands (1384–1581) ===
Habsburg Netherlands

Charles V, Lord of the Netherlands at the Battle of Mühlberg (1547), by Titian

The Low Countries in the late 14th century

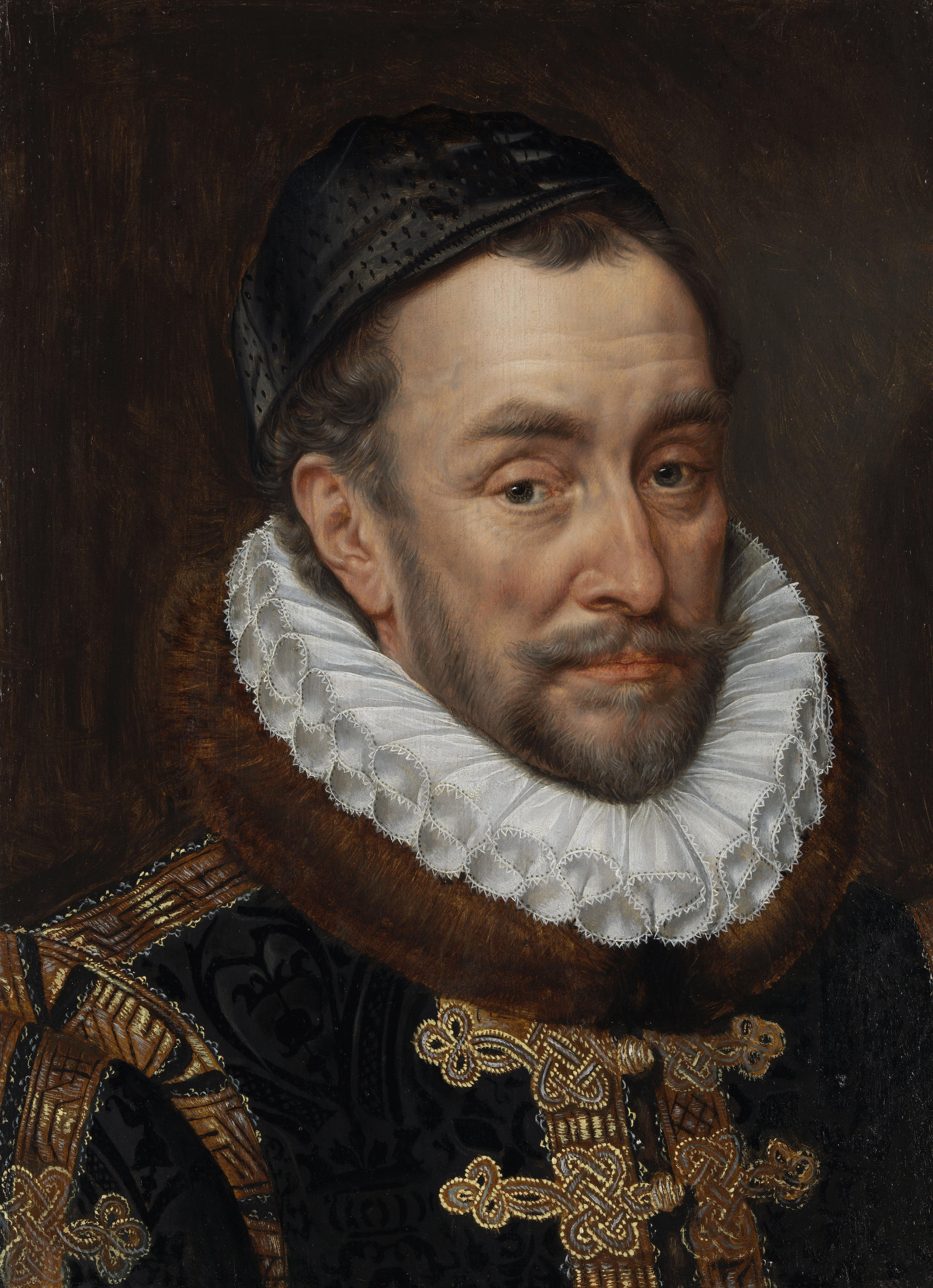
Prince William I of Orange, leader of the Dutch Revolt, by Adriaen Thomasz. Key

Most of the Imperial and French fiefs in the region were united in a personal union by Philip the Good in 1433. The House of Valois-Burgundy and their Habsburg heirs ruled the Low Countries from 1384 to 1581. The rulers defended Dutch trading interests. The fleets of the County of Holland defeated the fleets of the Hanseatic League several times. Amsterdam grew and in the 15th century became the primary trading port in Europe for grain from the Baltic region. Amsterdam distributed grain to the major cities of Belgium, northern France and England. This trade was vital because Holland could no longer produce enough grain to feed itself. Land drainage had caused the peat of the former wetlands to reduce to a level that was too low for drainage to be maintained.

Under Habsburg Charles V, all fiefs in the region were united into the Seventeen Provinces, which included most of present-day Belgium, Luxembourg, and parts of France and Germany. In 1568, under Phillip II the Eighty Years' War between the Seventeen Provinces and their Spanish ruler began. The level of ferocity exhibited by both sides can be gleaned from a Dutch chronicler's report:

On more than one occasion men were seen hanging their own brothers, who had been taken prisoners in the enemy's ranks... A Spaniard had ceased to be human in their eyes. On one occasion, a surgeon at Veer cut the heart from a Spanish prisoner, nailed it on a vessel's prow, and invited the townsmen to come and fasten their teeth in it, which many did with savage satisfaction.

The Duke of Alba attempted to suppress the Protestant movement in the Netherlands. Netherlanders were "burned, strangled, beheaded, or buried alive" by his "Blood Council" and Spanish soldiers. Bodies were displayed along roads to terrorise the population into submission. Alba boasted of having executed 18,600; this figure does not include those who perished by war and famine.

The first great siege was Alba's effort to capture Haarlem and thereby cut Holland in half. It dragged on from December 1572 to the next summer, when Haarlemers finally surrendered on 13 July upon the promise that the city would be spared from being sacked. It was a stipulation Don Fadrique was unable to honour, when his soldiers mutinied, angered over pay owed and the miserable conditions of the campaign. On 4 November 1576, Spanish tercios seized Antwerp and subjected it to the worst pillage in the Netherlands' history. The citizens resisted but were overcome; 7,000 were killed, and 1,000 buildings were torched.

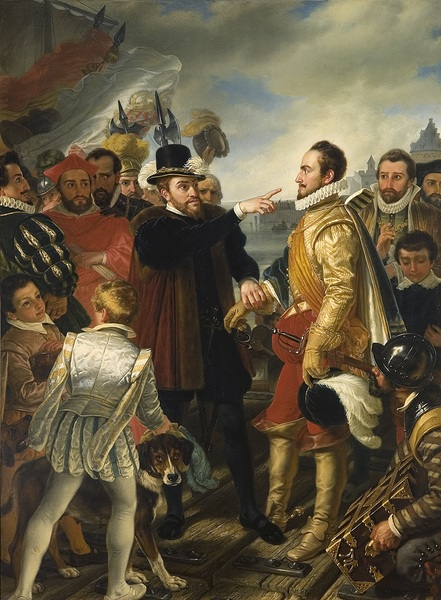
Philip II of Spain reproaches William of Orange in Vlissingen upon his departure from the Netherlands in 1559.

Delegates from Catholic Brabant, Protestant Holland and Zeeland agreed to join Utrecht and William the Silent in driving out Spanish troops and forming a new government for the Netherlands. Don Juan of Austria, the Spanish governor, was forced to concede initially but within months returned to active hostilities. The Dutch looked for help from the Protestant Elizabeth I of England, but she initially stood by her commitments to the Spanish in the Treaty of Bristol of 1573. When the next large-scale battle took place at Gembloux in 1578, the Spanish forces won easily. In light of the defeat at Gembloux, the southern states of the Seventeen Provinces distanced themselves from the rebels in the north with the 1579 Union of Arras. Opposing them, the northern half of the Seventeen Provinces forged the Union of Utrecht in which they committed to support each other against the Spanish. The Union of Utrecht is seen as the foundation of the modern Netherlands.

Spanish troops sacked Maastricht in 1579, killing over 10,000 civilians. In 1581, the northern provinces adopted the Act of Abjuration, the declaration of independence in which the provinces officially deposed Philip II. Against the rebels Philip could draw on the resources of the Spanish Empire. Elizabeth I sympathised with the Dutch struggle and sent an army of 7,600 soldiers to aid them. English forces faced the Spanish in the Netherlands under the Duke of Parma in a series of largely indecisive actions that tied down significant numbers of Spanish troops and bought time for the Dutch to reorganise their defences. The war continued until 1648, when Spain under King Philip IV recognised the independence of the seven north-western provinces in the Peace of Münster. Parts of the southern provinces became de facto colonies of the new republican-mercantile empire.

=== Dutch Republic (1581–1795) ===
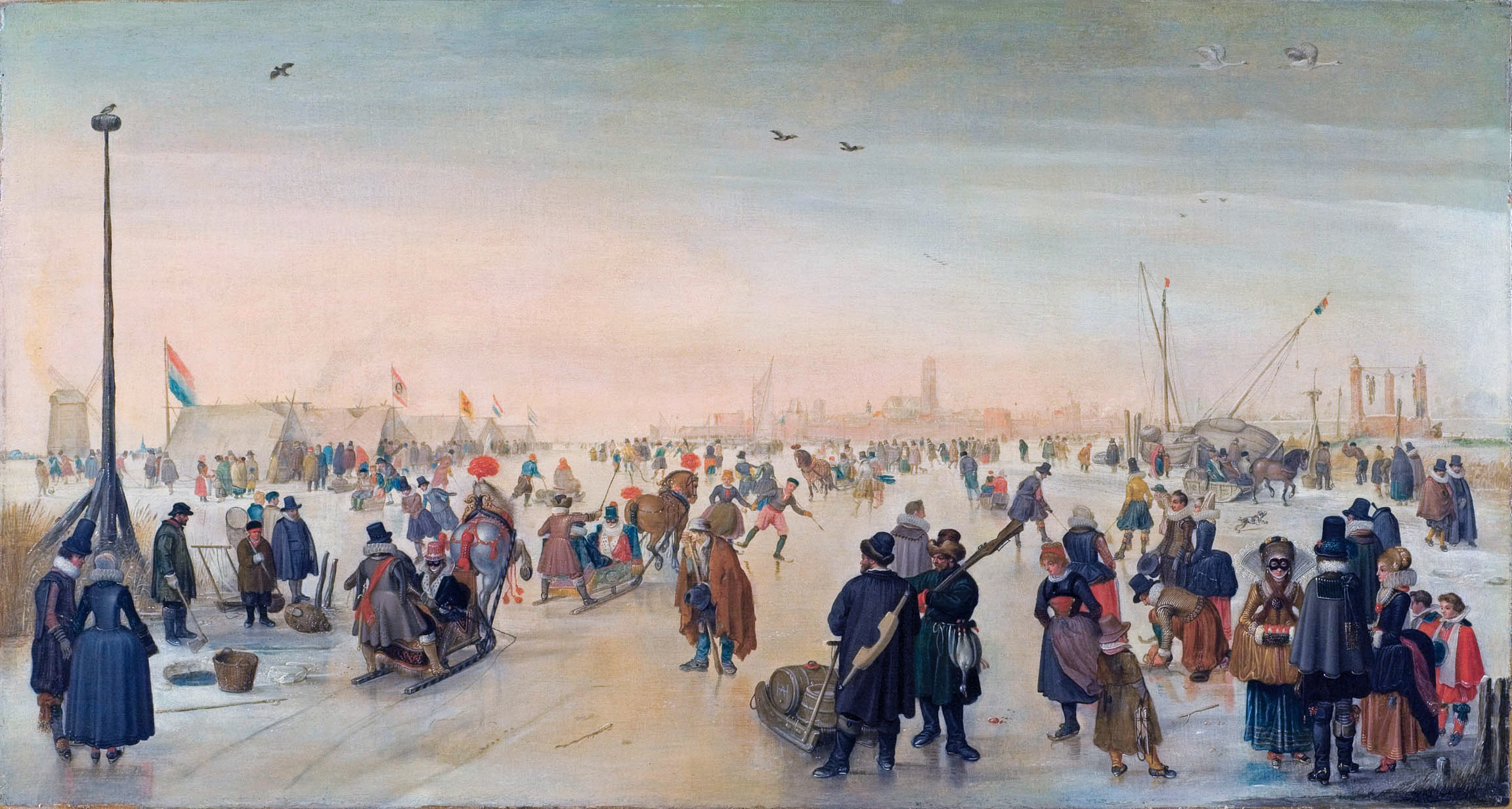
Winter landscape with skaters near the city of Kampen by Hendrick Avercamp (1620s)

After the declaration of independence, the provinces of Holland, Zeeland, Groningen, Friesland, Utrecht, Overijssel, and Gelderland entered into a confederation. All these duchies, lordships and counties enjoyed a significant degree of autonomy and were governed by their own administrative bodies known as the States-Provincial. The confederal government, known as the States General, was headquartered in The Hague and comprised representatives from each of the seven provinces. The sparsely populated region of Drenthe was part of the republic, albeit not considered a province in its own right. Moreover, during the Eighty Years' War, the republic came to occupy Generality Lands in Flanders, Brabant and Limburg. These areas were primarily inhabited by Roman Catholics and lacked a distinct governmental structure of their own. They were used as a buffer zone between the republic and the Spanish-controlled Southern Netherlands.

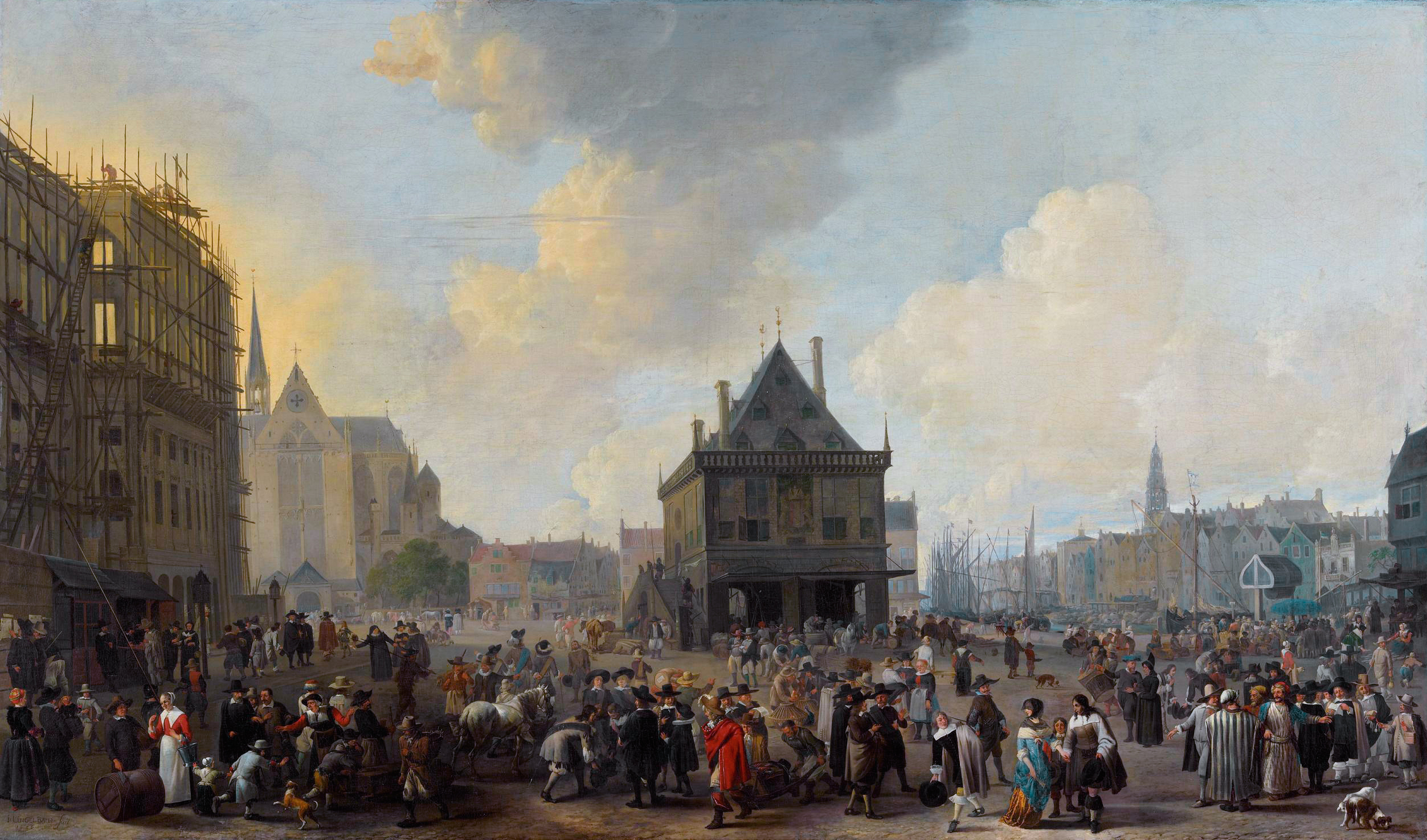
Amsterdam's Dam Square in 1656 by Johannes Lingelbach

During the Dutch Golden Age of the 17th century, the Dutch Republic grew to become one of the major seafaring and economic powers. Dutch science, military and art (especially painting) were among the most acclaimed in the world. By 1650, the Dutch owned 16,000 merchant ships. The Dutch East India Company and the Dutch West India Company established colonies and trading posts all over the world. The Dutch settlement in North America began with the formation of New Amsterdam in 1624. In South Africa, the Dutch settled the Cape Colony in 1652. Dutch colonies in South America were established along the many rivers in the fertile Guyana plains, among them Colony of Surinam. In Asia, the Dutch established a presence in India, the Dutch East Indies (now Indonesia), Formosa (now Taiwan), and the only western trading post in Japan, Dejima. During the period of proto-industrialisation, the empire received 50% of textiles and 80% of silks import from India's Mughal Empire.

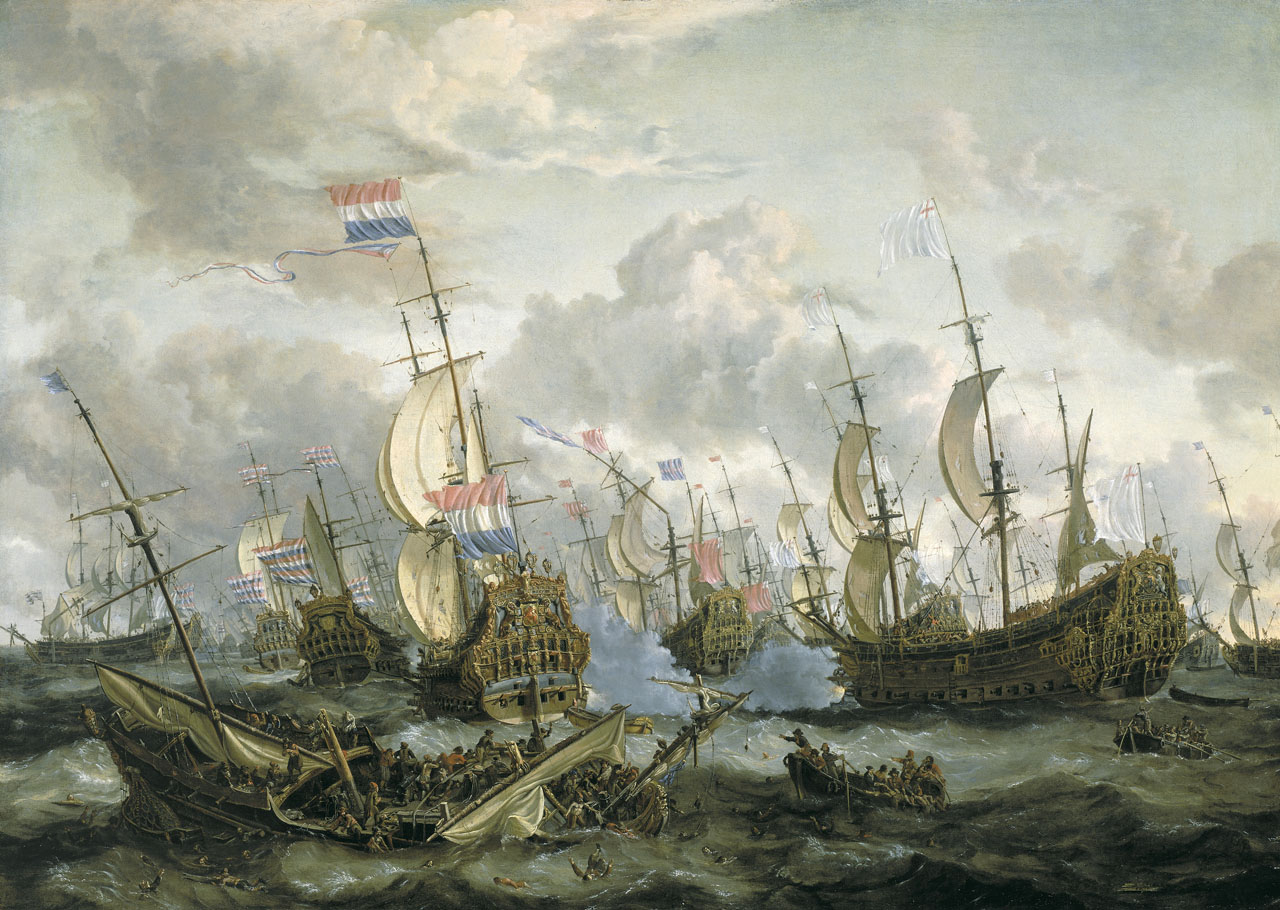
The Four Days' Battle during the Second Anglo-Dutch War, 1–4 June 1666

Many economic historians regard the Netherlands as the first thoroughly capitalist country. In early modern Europe, it had the wealthiest trading city in Amsterdam and the first full-time stock exchange. The inventiveness of the traders led to insurance and retirement funds as well as phenomena such as the boom-bust cycle, the world's first asset-inflation bubble, the tulip mania of 1636–1637, and the world's first bear raider, Isaac Le Maire. In 1672 – known in Dutch history as the Rampjaar (Disaster Year) – the Dutch Republic was attacked by France, England and two German bishoprics simultaneously, in what would become known as the Franco-Dutch War. At sea, it could successfully prevent the English and French navies from blockading the western shores. On land the republic was almost overrun by the advancing French and German armies from the east, but the Dutch managed to turn the tide by inundating parts of Holland.

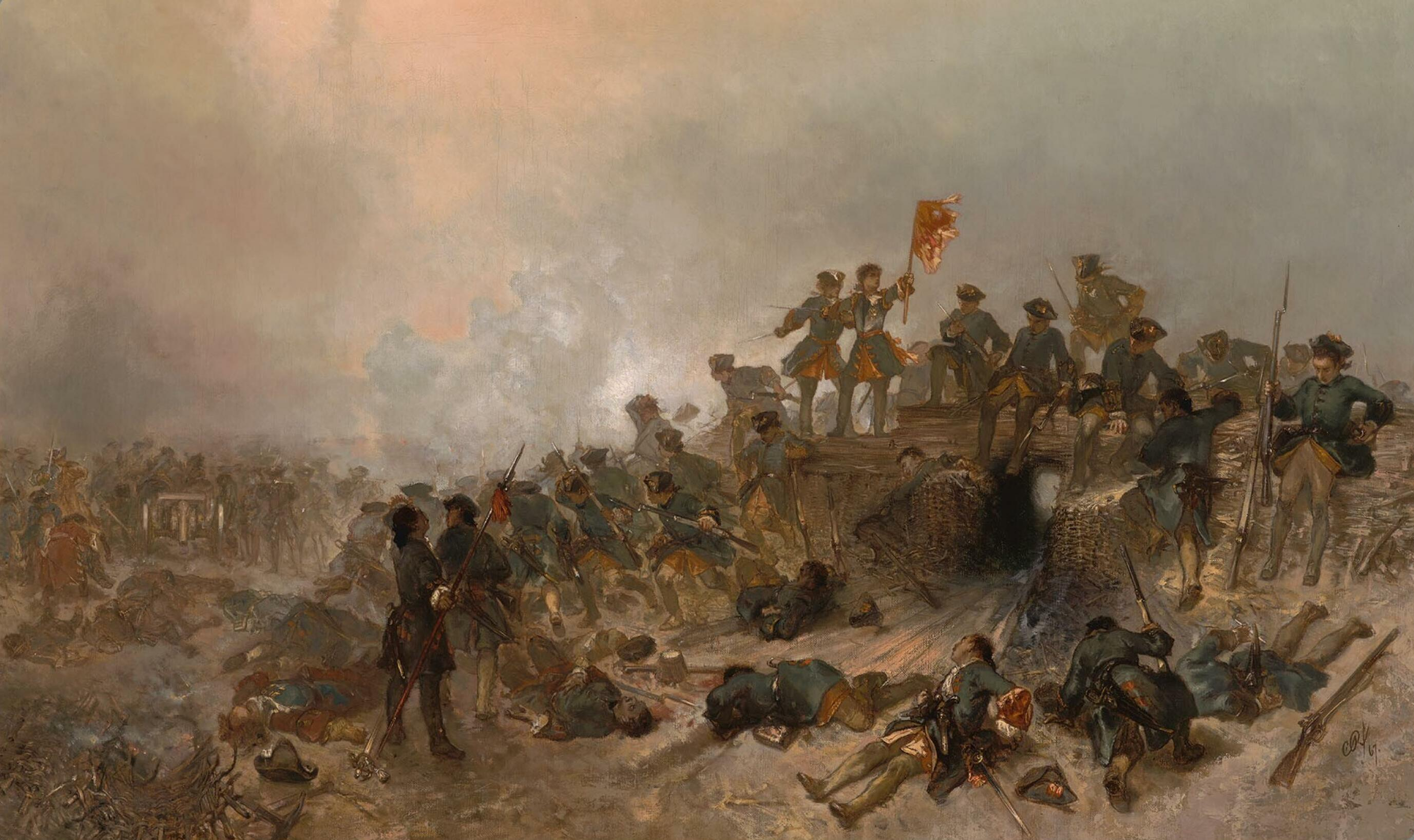
Dutch troops at the Battle of Malplaquet, 11 September 1709

From 1672 to 1712 the republic, led by William III of Orange and Anthonie Heinsius, would regularly clash with France in what some historians call the Forty Years' War. In the Nine Years' War and the War of the Spanish Succession, the republic was at the centre of anti-French coalitions. The Dutch ultimately successfully defended the Spanish Netherlands, established a barrier there, and their troops proved central to the alliance which halted French territorial expansion in Europe until a new cycle began in 1792 with the French Revolutionary Wars. However, the wars left them effectively bankrupt and inflicted permanent damage on the Dutch merchant navy; while they remained the dominant economic power in the Far East, Britain took over as the pre-eminent global commercial and maritime power. Between 1590 and 1713, the Dutch army had been one of Europe's largest and most capable armies. However, after the conclusion of the War of the Spanish Succession, other major powers, such as Prussia, Austria, Britain, and Russia, significantly expanded their military forces. The republic struggled to match these developments, and gradually assumed the status of a mid-tier power. However, historians have sometimes overstated the extent of this decline, especially when considering the period up to the 1750s.

=== Batavian Republic and Kingdom (1795–1890) ===
In the 18th century, the Dutch Republic was in a state of general decline, with economic competition from England and long-standing rivalries between the two main factions in Dutch society: the republican Staatsgezinden and the supporters of the stadtholder, the Prinsgezinden. With the armed support of revolutionary France, Dutch republicans proclaimed the Batavian Republic, modelled after the French Republic and rendering the Netherlands a unitary state on 19 January 1795. The stadtholder William V of Orange had fled to England. From 1806 to 1810, the Kingdom of Holland was set up by Napoleon Bonaparte as a puppet kingdom governed by his brother Louis Bonaparte. However, King Louis Bonaparte tried to serve Dutch interests instead of his brother's, and he was forced to abdicate on 1 July 1810. The emperor sent in an army, and the Netherlands became part of the French Empire until November 1813, when Napoleon was defeated in the Battle of Leipzig.

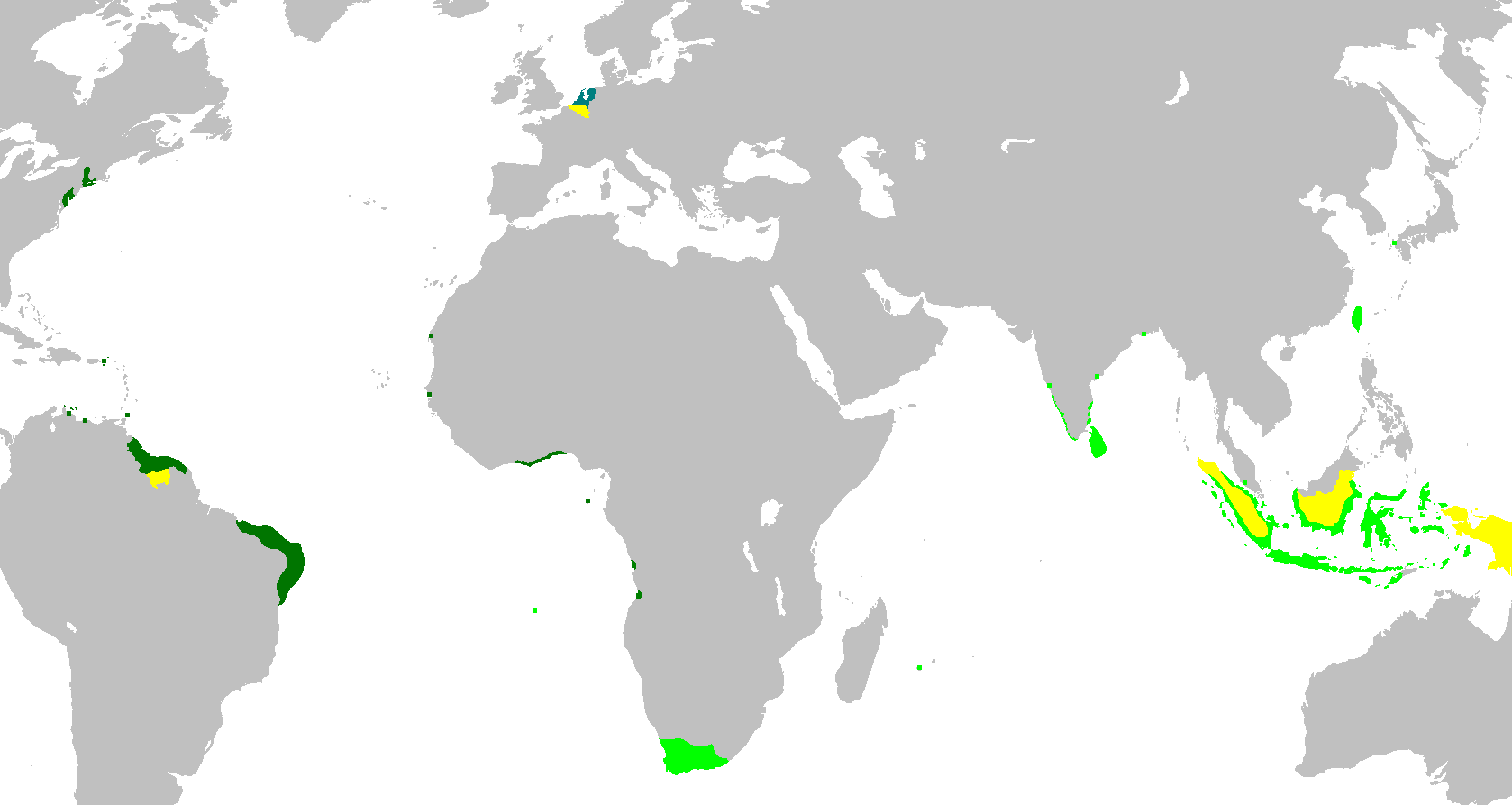
Map of the Dutch colonial empire. Light green: territories administered by or originating from territories administered by the Dutch East India Company; dark green: the Dutch West India Company. In yellow are the territories occupied later, during the 19th century.

William Frederick, son of the last stadtholder, returned to the Netherlands in 1813 and proclaimed himself Sovereign Prince. Two years later, the Congress of Vienna added the southern Netherlands to the north to create a strong country on the northern border of France. Frederick raised this United Netherlands to the status of a kingdom and proclaimed himself as King William I in 1815. William became hereditary Grand Duke of Luxembourg in exchange for his German possessions. The Southern Netherlands rebelled in 1830 and gained independence as Belgium (recognised by the Northern Netherlands in 1839). The personal union between Luxembourg and the Netherlands was severed in 1890 when William III died without a surviving male heir; salic law prevented his daughter Queen Wilhelmina from becoming grand duchess.

The Belgian Revolution and the Java War in the Dutch East Indies brought the Netherlands to the brink of bankruptcy. However, the Cultivation System was introduced in 1830; in the Dutch East Indies, 20% of village land had to be devoted to government crops for export. The policy brought the Dutch enormous wealth and made the colony self-sufficient. The Netherlands abolished slavery in its colonies in 1863; Enslaved people in Surinam became free in 1873.

=== World wars and beyond (1890–present) ===
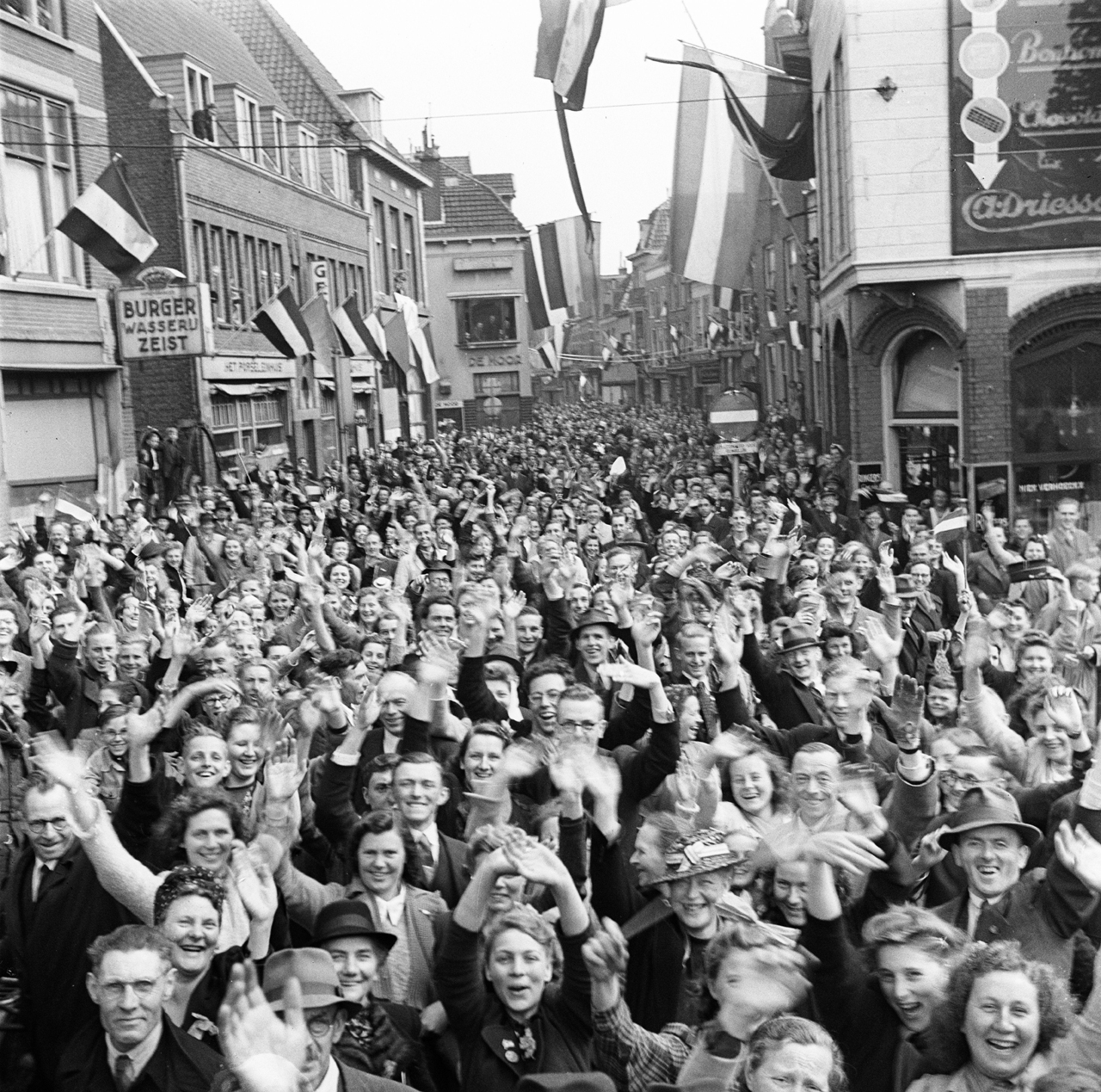
People celebrating the liberation of Utrecht at the end of World War II on 7 May 1945

The Netherlands remained neutral during World War I, in part because the import of goods through the Netherlands proved essential to German survival until the blockade by the British Royal Navy in 1916. That changed in World War II, when Germany invaded the Netherlands on 10 May 1940. The Rotterdam Blitz forced most of the Dutch army to surrender. During the occupation, over 100,000 Dutch Jews were transported to Nazi extermination camps; only a few survived. Dutch workers were conscripted for forced labour in Germany, civilians who resisted were killed in reprisal for attacks on German soldiers, and the countryside was plundered for food. Although there were thousands of Dutch who risked their lives by hiding Jews from the Germans, over 20,000 Dutch fascists joined the Waffen SS. Political collaborators were members of the fascist NSB, the only legal political party in the occupied Netherlands. On 8 December 1941, the Dutch government-in-exile in London declared war on Japan, but could not prevent the Japanese occupation of the Dutch East Indies. More than 20,000 people died from starvation during the Dutch famine of 1944–1945. In 1944–45, the First Canadian Army liberated much of the Netherlands. Soon after VE Day, the Dutch fought a colonial war against the new Republic of Indonesia.

==== Decolonisation ====
In 1954, the Charter for the Kingdom of the Netherlands reformed the political structure as a result of international pressure to carry out decolonisation. The Dutch colonies of Surinam and Curaçao and Dependencies became constituent countries within the kingdom. Indonesia had declared its independence in August 1945. Suriname followed in 1975. The Netherlands was one of the founding members of Benelux and NATO. In the 1950s, the Netherlands became one of the six founding countries of the European Communities, after the 1952 establishment of the European Coal and Steel Community, and subsequent 1958 creations of the European Economic Community and European Atomic Energy Community. In 1993, the former two were incorporated into the European Union.

Government-encouraged emigration efforts to reduce population density prompted some 500,000 Dutch to leave the country after World War II. The 1960s and 1970s were a time of great social and cultural change, such as rapid de-pillarisation. Students and other youth rejected traditional mores and pushed for change in matters such as women's rights, sexuality, disarmament and environmental issues. In 2002, the euro banknotes and coins entered circulation. In 2010, the Netherlands Antilles was dissolved after referendums on each island. Subsequently, Bonaire, Sint Eustatius and Saba were incorporated as special municipalities, collectively known as the Caribbean Netherlands.

== Geography ==
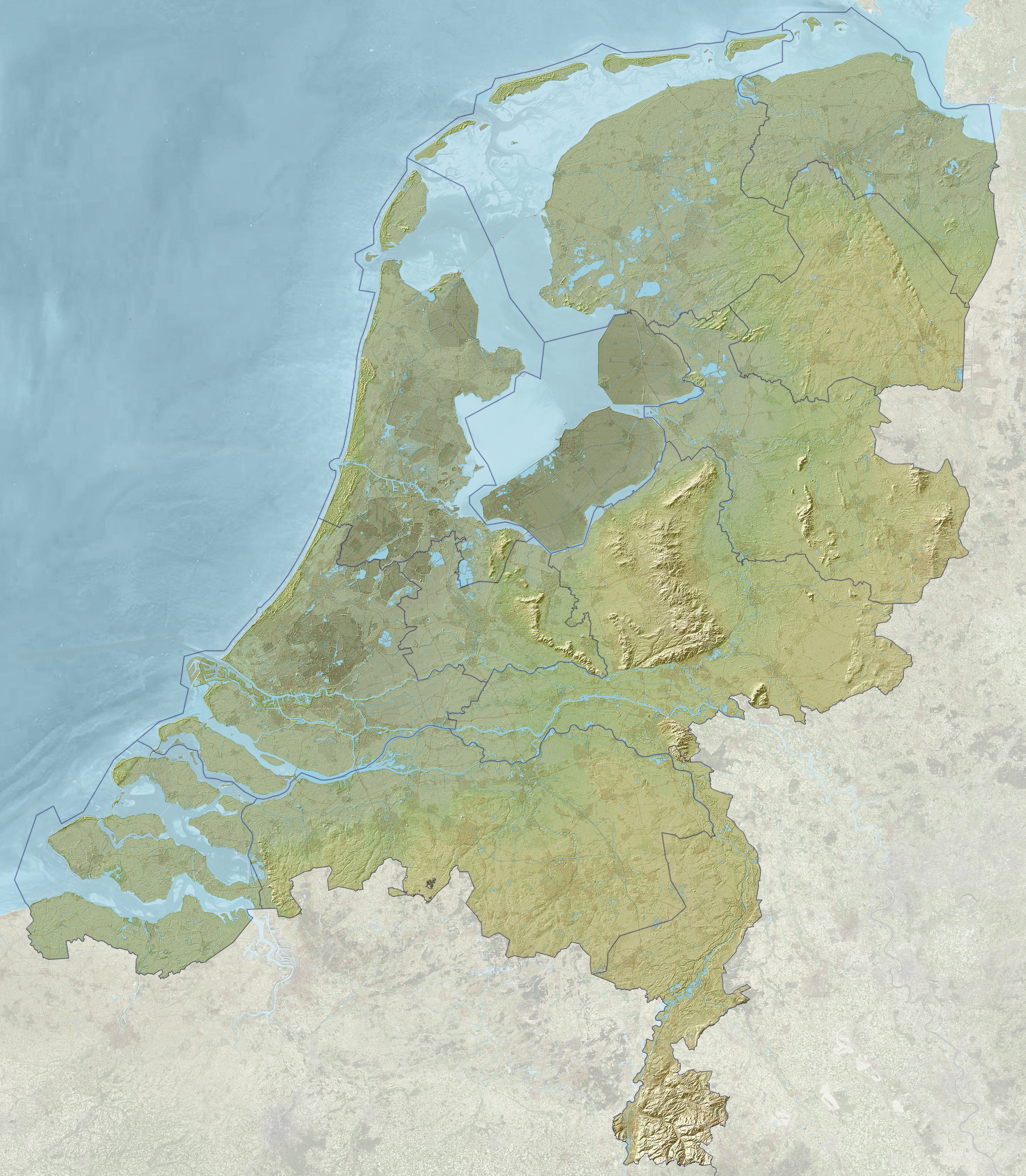
Relief map of the European Netherlands

The European Netherlands has a total area of 41,543 km^{2} (16,040 sq mi), including water bodies, and a land area of 33,481 km^{2} (12,927 sq mi). The Caribbean Netherlands has a total area of 322 km^{2} (124 sq mi) It lies between latitudes 50° and 54° N, and longitudes 3° and 8° E.

The Netherlands is geographically very low relative to sea level and is considered a flat country, with about 26% of its area and 21% of its population below sea level. There are hills in the southeast, less than 322 m (1,056 ft) high at the Vaalserberg, and there are some low hill ranges in the central parts. Most of the areas below sea level are caused by peat extraction or achieved through land reclamation. Since the late 16th century, large polder areas are preserved through elaborate drainage systems that include dykes, canals and pumping stations.

Much of the country was originally formed by the estuaries of three large European rivers: the Rhine (Rijn), the Meuse (Maas) and the Scheldt (Schelde), as well as their tributaries. South-western Netherlands is a river delta of these rivers, the Rhine–Meuse–Scheldt Delta.

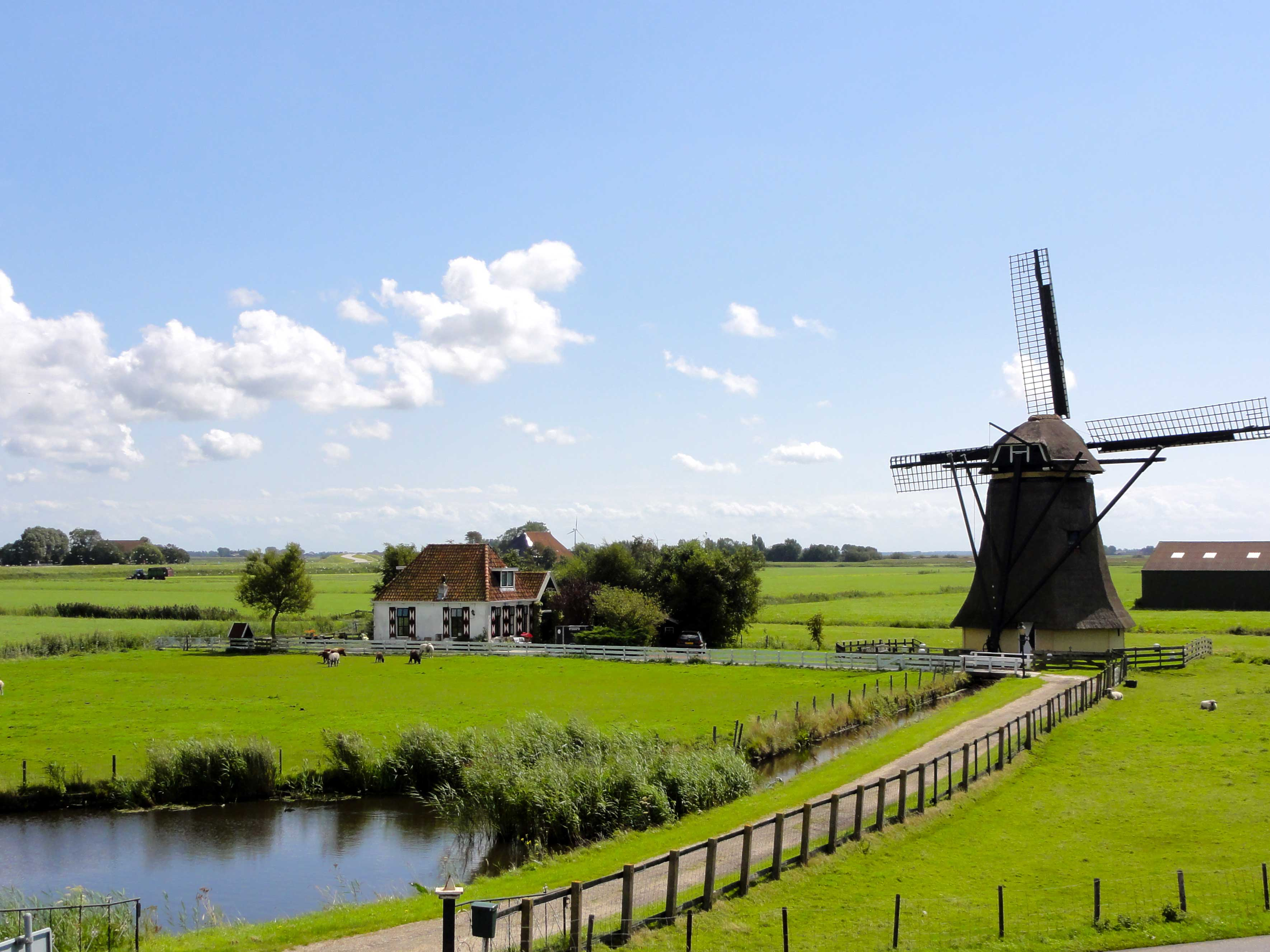
Landscape at Workum, Friesland

The European Netherlands is divided north and south by the Rhine, the Waal (its main tributary), and the Meuse. These rivers functioned as a natural barrier between fiefdoms and hence historically created a cultural divide, as is evident in some phonetic traits that are recognisable on either side of what the Dutch call their "Great Rivers" (de Grote Rivieren). Another significant branch of the Rhine, the IJssel river, discharges into Lake IJssel, the former Zuiderzee ('southern sea'). This river also forms a linguistic divide: people to the northeast of this river speak Dutch Low Saxon dialects (except for the province of Friesland, which has its own language).

=== Caribbean islands ===
In the Lesser Antilles islands of the Caribbean, the territories of Curaçao, Aruba and Sint Maarten have a constituent country status within the wider Kingdom of the Netherlands. Another three territories which make up the Caribbean Netherlands are designated as special municipalities. The Caribbean Netherlands have maritime borders with Anguilla, Curaçao, France (Saint Barthélemy), Saint Kitts and Nevis, the U.S. Virgin Islands and Venezuela. The islands enjoy a tropical climate with warm weather all year round.

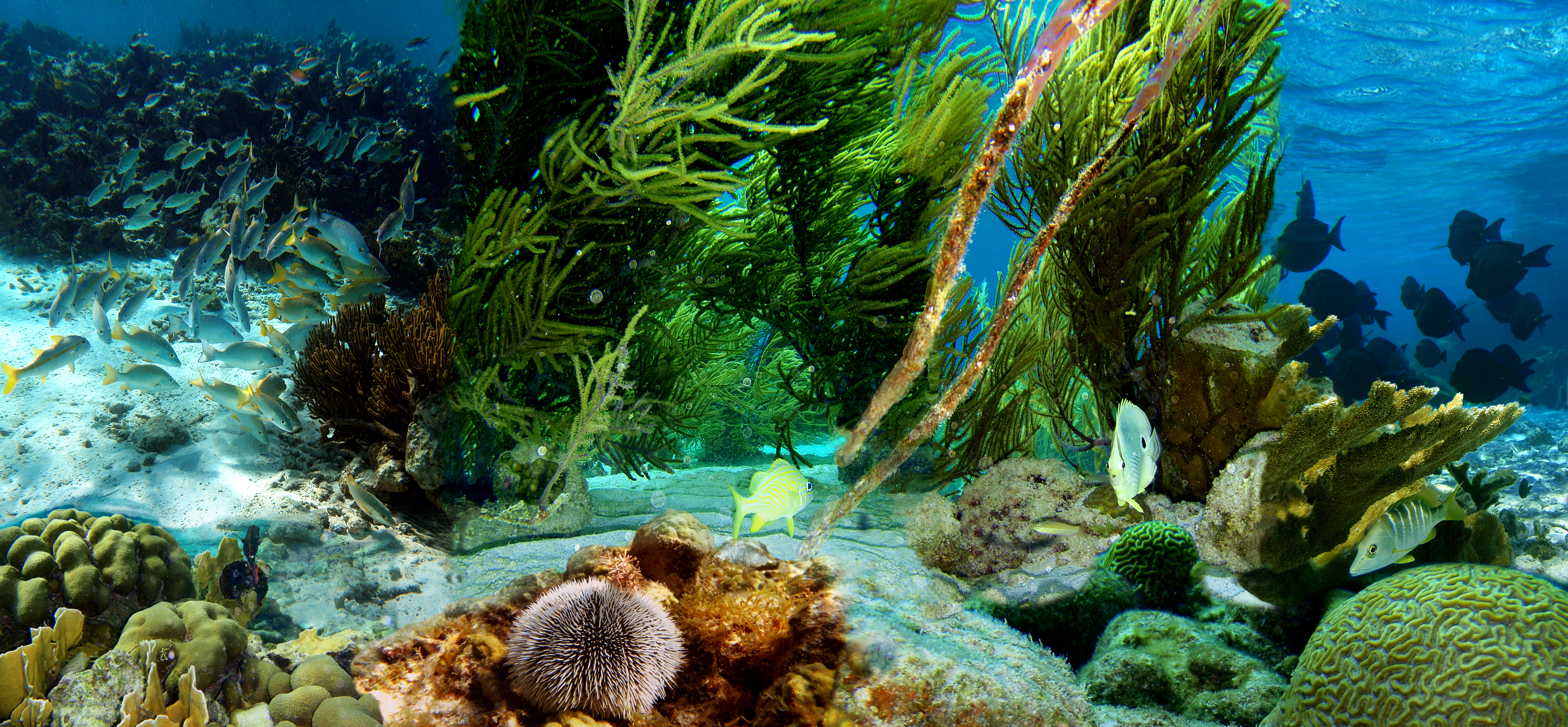
Underwater life of Klein Bonaire

Within this island group:

- Bonaire is part of the ABC islands within the Leeward Antilles island chain off the Venezuelan coast. The Leeward Antilles have a mixed volcanic and coral origin.
- Saba and Sint Eustatius are part of the SSS islands within the Leeward Islands. They lie east of Puerto Rico and the Virgin Islands. The locals (French, Spanish, Dutch and the locally spoken English) consider them part of the Windward Islands, although in the international English language, the Windward Islands refer to other islands further south. These two islands are of volcanic origin and hilly, leaving little ground suitable for agriculture. The highest point is Mount Scenery, 870 m (2,850 ft), on Saba. This is the highest point in the country and in the entire Kingdom of the Netherlands.

=== Geology ===
The Netherlands is mostly composed of deltaic, coastal and aeolian derived sediments during the Pleistocene glacial and interglacial periods. The western Netherlands is composed of the Rhine-Meuse river estuary. In the east, remains are found of the last ice age, which ended approximately 10,000 years ago. As the continental ice sheet moved in from the north, it pushed moraine forward. The ice sheet halted as it covered the eastern half of the Netherlands. After the ice age ended, the moraine remained in the form of a long hill-line. Arnhem and Nijmegen are built on these hills.

=== Floods ===
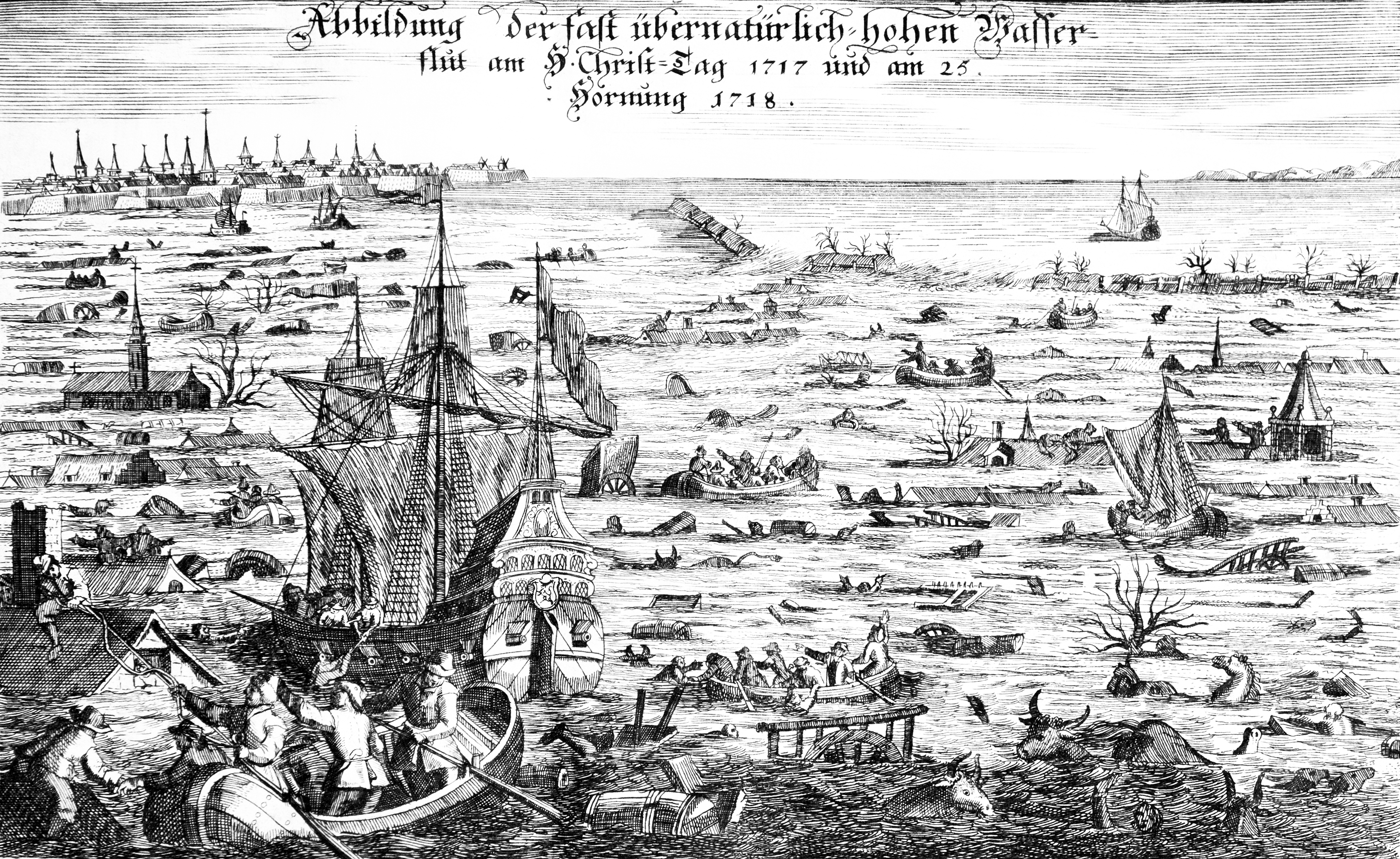
The Christmas Flood of 1717 resulted in the death of thousands.

Over the centuries, the Dutch coastline has changed considerably as a result of natural disasters and human intervention. On 14 December 1287, St. Lucia's flood affected the Netherlands and neighbouring Germany, killing more than 50,000 people in one of the most destructive floods in recorded history. The St. Elizabeth flood of 1421 and the mismanagement in its aftermath destroyed a newly reclaimed polder, replacing it with the 72 km^{2} (28 mi^{2}) Biesbosch tidal floodplains. The North Sea flood of 1953 caused the collapse of several dykes in the southwest Netherlands; more than 1,800 people drowned. The Dutch government subsequently instituted a large-scale programme, the "Delta Works", to protect the country against future flooding, which was completed over a period of more than 40 years.

Map illustrating areas of the Netherlands below sea level

The consequences of disasters were, to an extent, increased through human activity. Relatively high-lying swampland was drained to be used as farmland. The drainage caused the fertile peat to contract and ground levels to drop; groundwater levels were lowered to compensate, causing the underlying peat to contract further. Additionally, until the 19th century, peat was mined, dried, and used for fuel, further exacerbating the problem. Even in flooded areas, peat extraction continued through turf dredging.

To guard against floods, a series of defences against the water were contrived. In the first millennium AD, villages and farmhouses were built on hills called terps. Later, these terps were connected by dykes. In the 12th century, local government agencies called "waterschappen" ("water boards") or "hoogheemraadschappen" ("high home councils") started to appear, whose job it was to maintain the water level and to protect a region from floods; these agencies continue to exist. As the ground level dropped, the dykes by necessity grew and merged into an integrated system. By the 13th century windmills had come into use to pump water. The windmills were later used to drain lakes, creating the famous polders. In 1932 the Afsluitdijk ("Closure Dike") was completed, blocking the former Zuiderzee (Southern Sea) from the North Sea and thus creating the IJsselmeer. It became part of the larger Zuiderzee Works in which four polders totalling 2,500 square kilometres (965 mi^{2}) were reclaimed from the sea.

=== Delta Works ===
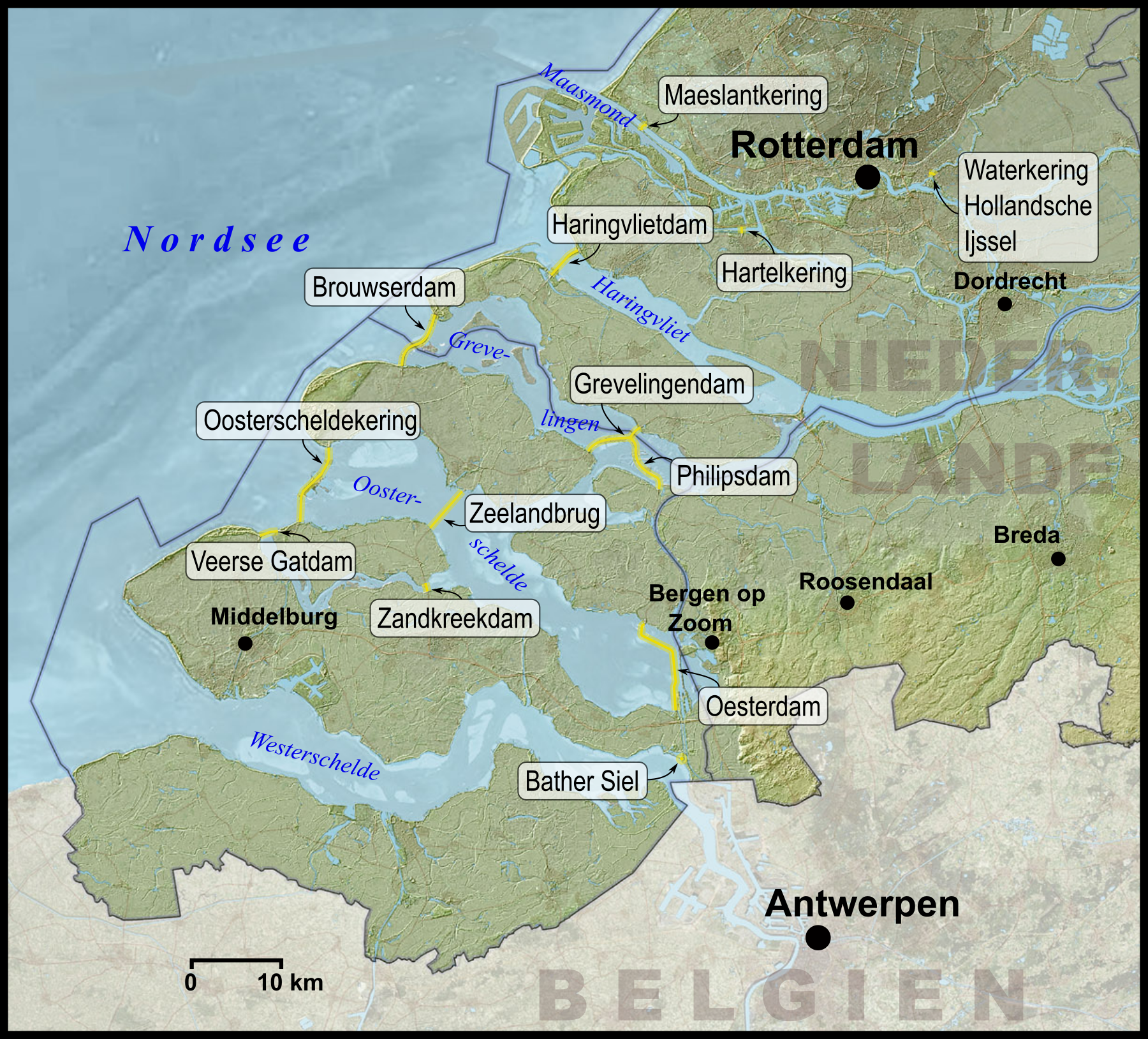
The Delta Works are in the provinces of South Holland and Zeeland.

After the 1953 disaster, the Delta Works was constructed, which is a comprehensive set of civil works throughout the Dutch coast. The project started in 1958 and was largely completed in 1997 with the completion of the Maeslantkering. Since then, new projects have been periodically started to renovate and renew the Delta Works. The main goal of the Delta project was to reduce the risk of flooding in South Holland and Zeeland. This was achieved by raising 3,000 km (1,900 mi) of outer sea-dykes and 10,000 km (6,200 mi) of the inner, canal, and river dykes, and by closing off the sea estuaries of Zeeland. New risk assessments occasionally show problems requiring additional Delta project dyke reinforcements. The Delta project is considered by the American Society of Civil Engineers as one of the seven wonders of the modern world.

The Netherlands is one of the countries that may suffer most from climate change. Not only is the rising sea a problem, but erratic weather patterns may cause the rivers to overflow. The Netherlands is actively preparing for a sea-level rise. The Delta Commission has formulated an action plan to cope with a sea-level rise of 1.10 m (4 ft) and a simultaneous land height decline of 10 cm (4 in). The plan encompasses the reinforcement of existing coastal defences like dykes and dunes with 1.30 m (4.3 ft) of additional flood protection. To protect the country from river flooding, the Room for the River plan grants more flow space to rivers, protects the major populated areas and allows for periodic flooding of indefensible lands. The few residents who lived in these so-called "overflow areas" have been moved to higher ground, some of that ground having been raised above anticipated flood levels.

=== Climate change ===
The Netherlands is already affected by climate change. The average temperature in the Netherlands rose by more than 2°C from 1901 to 2020. Climate change has resulted in increased frequency of droughts and heat waves. Because significant portions of the Netherlands have been reclaimed from the sea or otherwise are near sea level, the Netherlands is very vulnerable to sea level rise.

The Netherlands has the fourth largest greenhouse gas emissions per capita of the European Union, in part due to the large number of cows. The Dutch response to climate change is driven by a number of unique factors, including larger green recovery plans by the European Union in the face of the COVID-19 and a climate change litigation case, State of the Netherlands v. Urgenda Foundation, which created mandatory climate change mitigation through emissions reductions 25% below 1990 levels. In 2021 CO_{2} emissions were down 14% compared to 1990 levels. The goal of the Dutch government is to reduce emissions in 2030 by 49%.

=== Nature ===
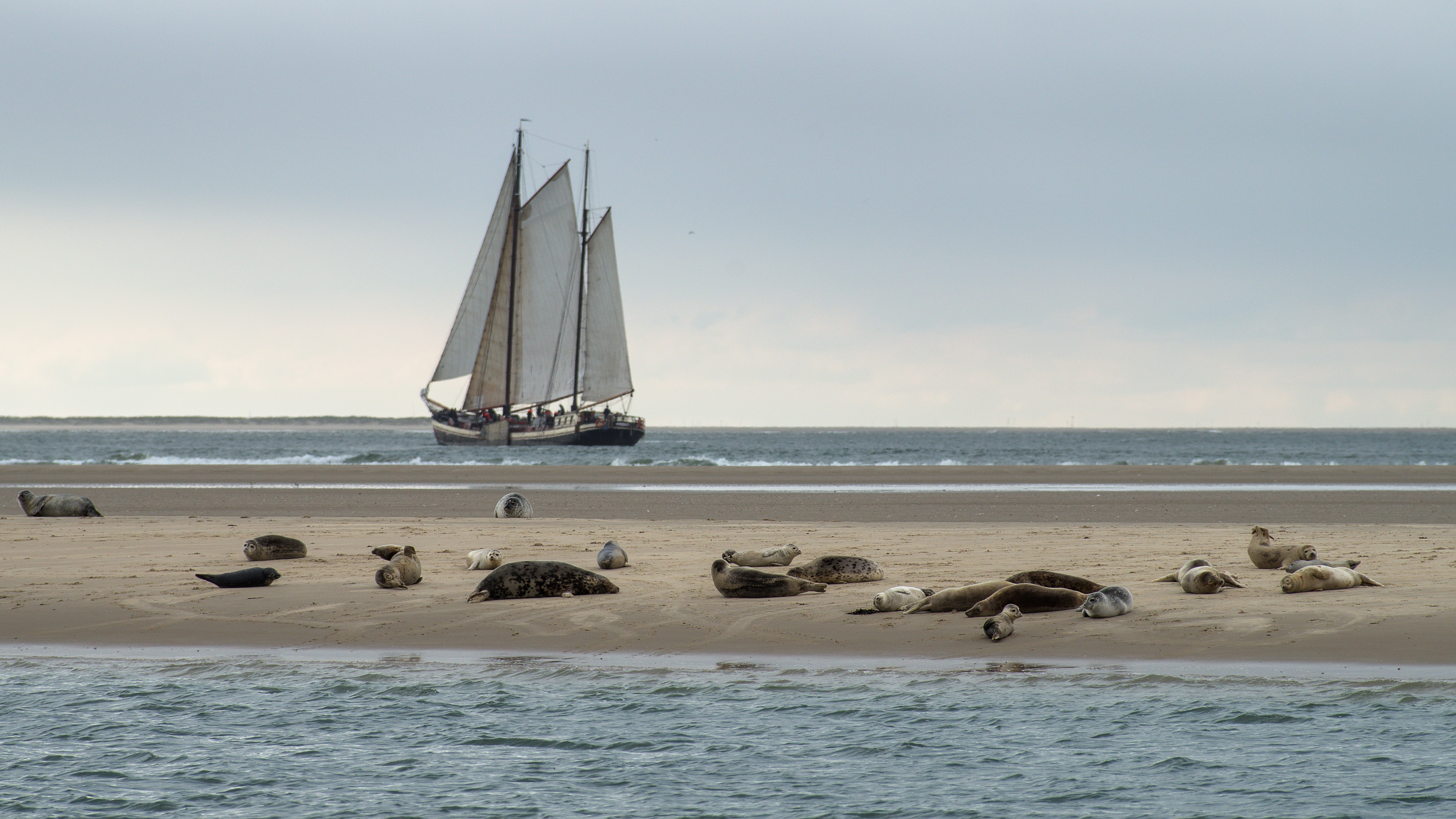
Common seals off the coast of Terschelling, a Wadden Sea island

The Netherlands has 21 national parks and hundreds of other nature reserves. Most of these are owned by Staatsbosbeheer, the national department for forestry and nature conservation and Natuurmonumenten, a private organisation that buys, protects and manages nature reserves. The Wadden Sea in the north, with its tidal flats and wetlands, is rich in biological diversity, and is a UNESCO World Heritage Nature Site. The Eastern Scheldt, formerly the northeast estuary of the river Scheldt was designated a national park in 2002, making it the largest national park at an area of 370 km^{2} (140 sq mi).

Phytogeographically, the European Netherlands is shared between the Atlantic European and Central European provinces of the Circumboreal Region within the Boreal Kingdom. According to the World Wide Fund for Nature, the area belongs to the ecoregion of Atlantic mixed forests. In 1871, the last natural woods were cut down. These woods were planted on anthropogenic heaths and sand-drifts (overgrazed heaths) (Veluwe). The Netherlands had a 2019 Forest Landscape Integrity Index mean score of 0.6/10, ranking it 169th globally out of 172 countries. Nitrogen pollution is a problem. The number of flying insects in the Netherlands has dropped by 75% since the 1990s.

== Government and politics ==
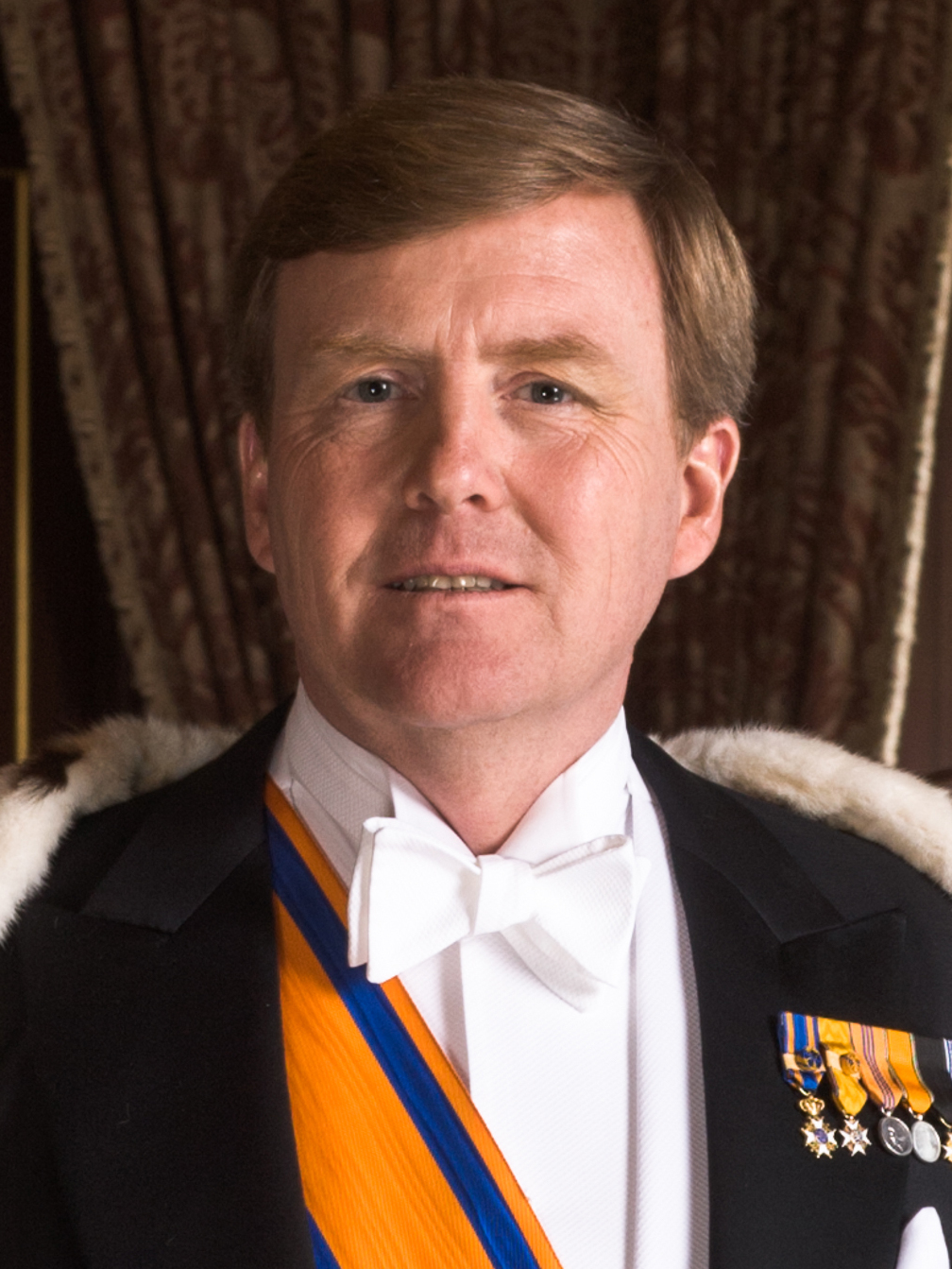
Willem-Alexander
King

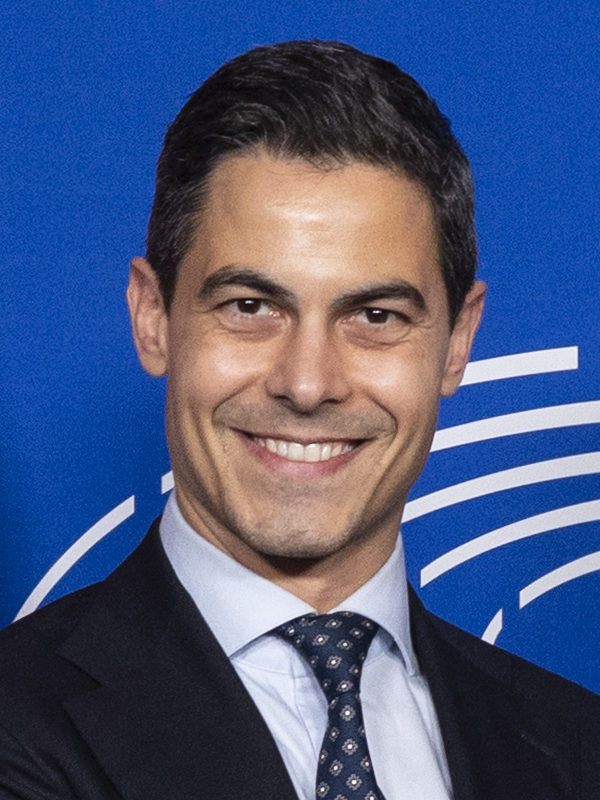
Rob Jetten
Prime Minister

The Netherlands has been a constitutional monarchy since 1815 and a parliamentary democracy since 1848. The Netherlands is described as a consociational state. Dutch politics and governance are characterised by an effort to achieve broad consensus on important issues. According to International IDEA's Global State of Democracy Indices and Democracy Tracker, the Netherlands performs in the high range on overall democratic measures, with particular strengths in political representation, including elected government and inclusive suffrage. Furthermore, the Netherlands was ranked as the 17th best electoral democracy in the world by V-Dem Democracy indices in 2023 and 9th most democratic country in the world by the Democracy Index (The Economist) in 2022.

The monarch is the head of state, at present King Willem-Alexander of the Netherlands. Constitutionally, the position is equipped with limited powers due to ministerial responsibility. The executive power is formed by the government that includes the monarch and the Council of Ministers, the deliberative organ of the Dutch cabinet. The cabinet usually consists of 13 to 16 ministers and a varying number of state secretaries. One to three ministers are ministers without portfolio. The council of ministers is presided over by the Prime Minister of the Netherlands, who often is the leader of the largest party of the coalition. The Prime Minister is a primus inter pares, with no explicit powers beyond those of the other ministers. Rob Jetten has been the prime minister since February 2026.

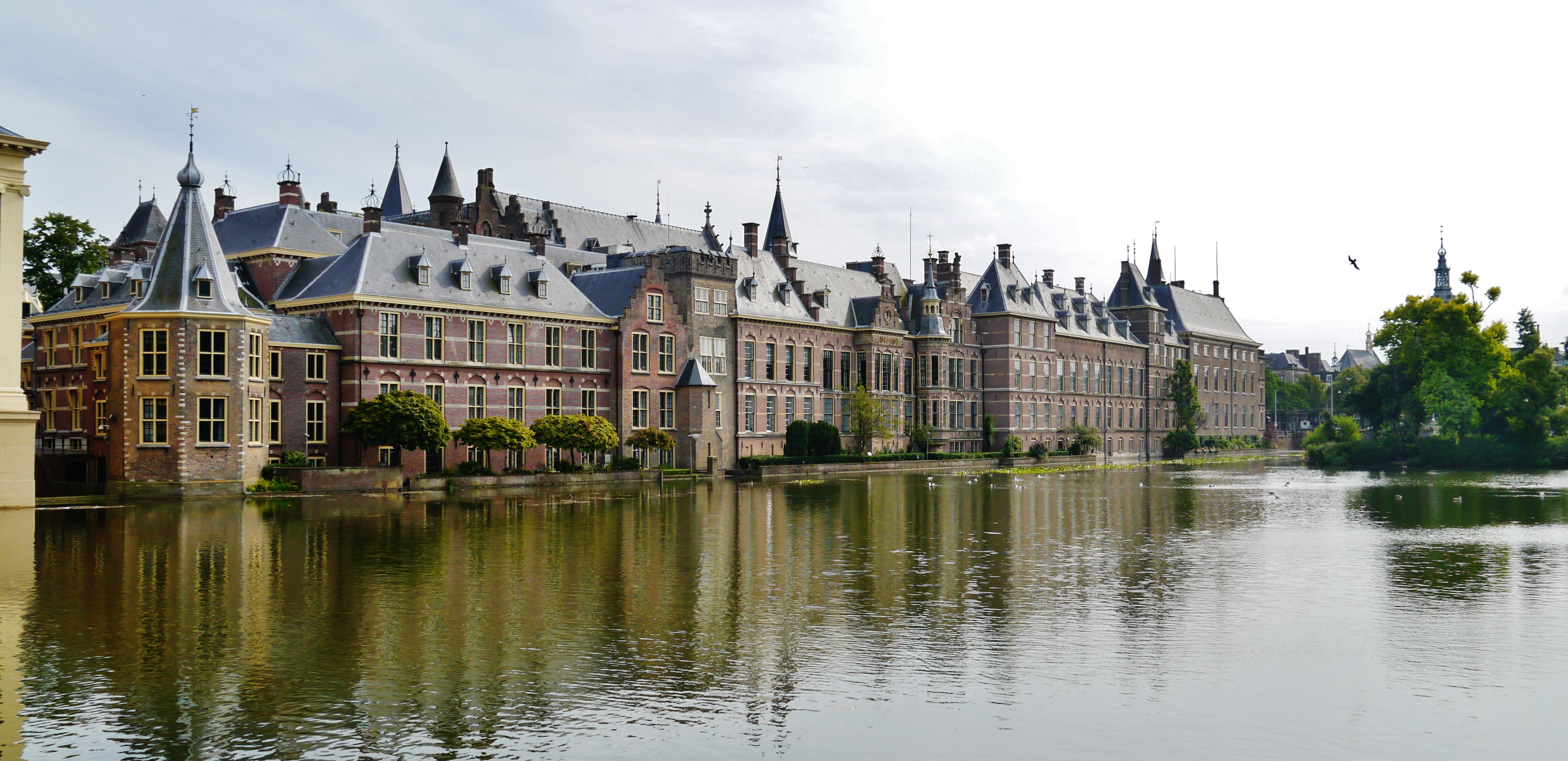
The Binnenhof, where the lower and upper houses of the States General meet

The cabinet is responsible to the bicameral parliament, the States General, which also has legislative powers. The 150 members of the House of Representatives, the lower house, are elected in direct elections on the basis of party-list proportional representation. These are held every four years or sooner in case the cabinet falls. The provincial assemblies, the States Provincial, are directly elected every four years as well. The members of the provincial assemblies elect the 75 members of the Senate, the upper house, which has the power to reject laws but not amend them.

=== Political culture ===
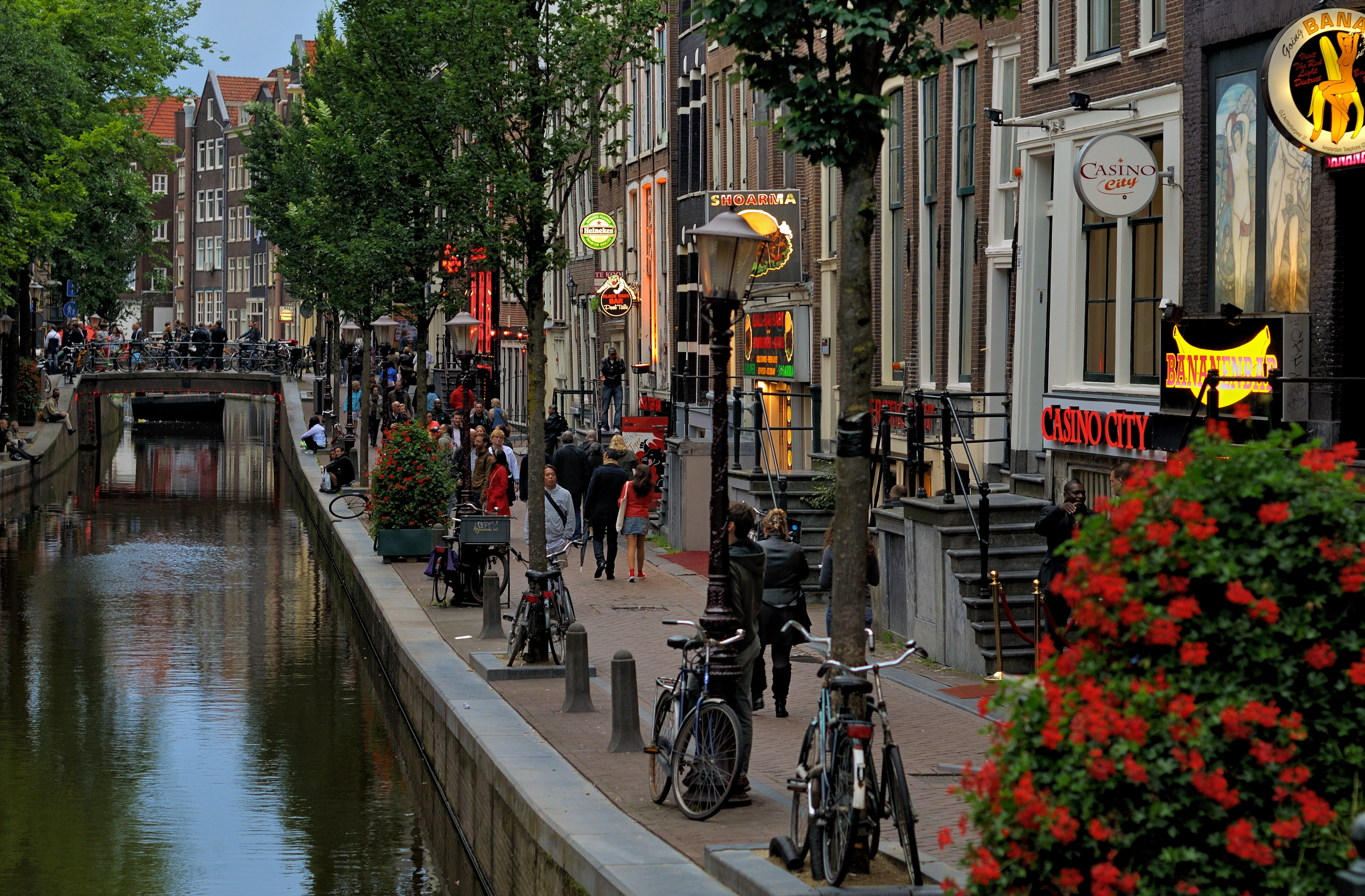
De Wallen, Amsterdam's red-light district, offers activities such as legal prostitution, symbolizing the Dutch political culture and tradition of tolerance.

Both trade unions and employers organisations are consulted in policymaking in the financial, economic and social areas. They meet regularly with the government in the Social and Economic Council. The Netherlands has a tradition of social tolerance. In the late 19th century this tradition of religious tolerance transformed into a system of pillarisation, in which religious groups coexisted separately and only interacted at the level of government. Protection for LGBTQ and abortion rights are enshrined within the foreign aid policy.

No single party has held a majority in parliament since the 19th century, and as a result, coalition cabinets had to be formed. Since male suffrage became universal in 1917, the political system has been dominated by three families of political parties: Christian Democrats (currently the CDA), Social Democrats (currently Pro), and Liberals (currently the VVD). In November 2025, the centrist-liberal D66 of Rob Jetten was the winner of a general election, securing 26 out of 150 seats in the House of Representatives, and its cabinet was formed by February 2026.

=== Administrative divisions ===
Provinces and territories of the Netherlands

The Netherlands is divided into 12 provinces, each under a king's commissioner. Provinces are divided into municipalities (gemeenten), of which there are 342 (2023). There are 21 water districts governed by a water board (waterschap or hoogheemraadschap), each having authority in matters concerning water management. The creation of water boards pre-dates the nation, the first appearing in 1196. The water boards are among the oldest democratic entities in the world still in existence. Direct elections of the water boards take place every four years.

Within Baarle-Nassau, are 22 Belgian exclaves, and within those are eight Dutch enclaves.

Province	Capital	Largest city	Total area (km^{2})	Land area (km^{2})	Population (2023)	Density (/km^{2})
Drenthe	Assen		2,680	2,633	502,051	191
Flevoland	Lelystad	Almere	2,412	1,410	444,701	315
Friesland	Leeuwarden		5,753	3,340	659,551	197
Gelderland	Arnhem	Nijmegen	5,136	4,960	2,133,708	430
Groningen	Groningen		2,955	2,316	596,075	257
Limburg	Maastricht		2,210	2,145	1,128,367	526
North Brabant	's-Hertogenbosch (Den Bosch)	Eindhoven	5,082	4,902	2,626,210	536
North Holland	Haarlem	Amsterdam	4,092	2,663	2,952,622	1,109
Overijssel	Zwolle	Enschede	3,421	3,317	1,184,333	357
South Holland	The Hague	Rotterdam	3,308	2,698	3,804,906	1,410
Utrecht	Utrecht		1,560	1,484	1,387,643	935
Zeeland	Middelburg		2,933	1,780	391,124	220
Mainland			41,543	33,647	17,811,291	529

The administrative structure in the Caribbean Netherlands is outside the 12 provinces. The islands have the status of openbare lichamen (public bodies), referred to as special municipalities.

Island	Capital	Area (km^{2})	Population (2023)	Density (/km^{2})
Bonaire	Kralendijk	288	24,090	84
Saba	The Bottom	13	2,035	157
Sint Eustatius	Oranjestad	21	3,293	157
Caribbean Netherlands		322	29,418	91

=== Foreign relations ===
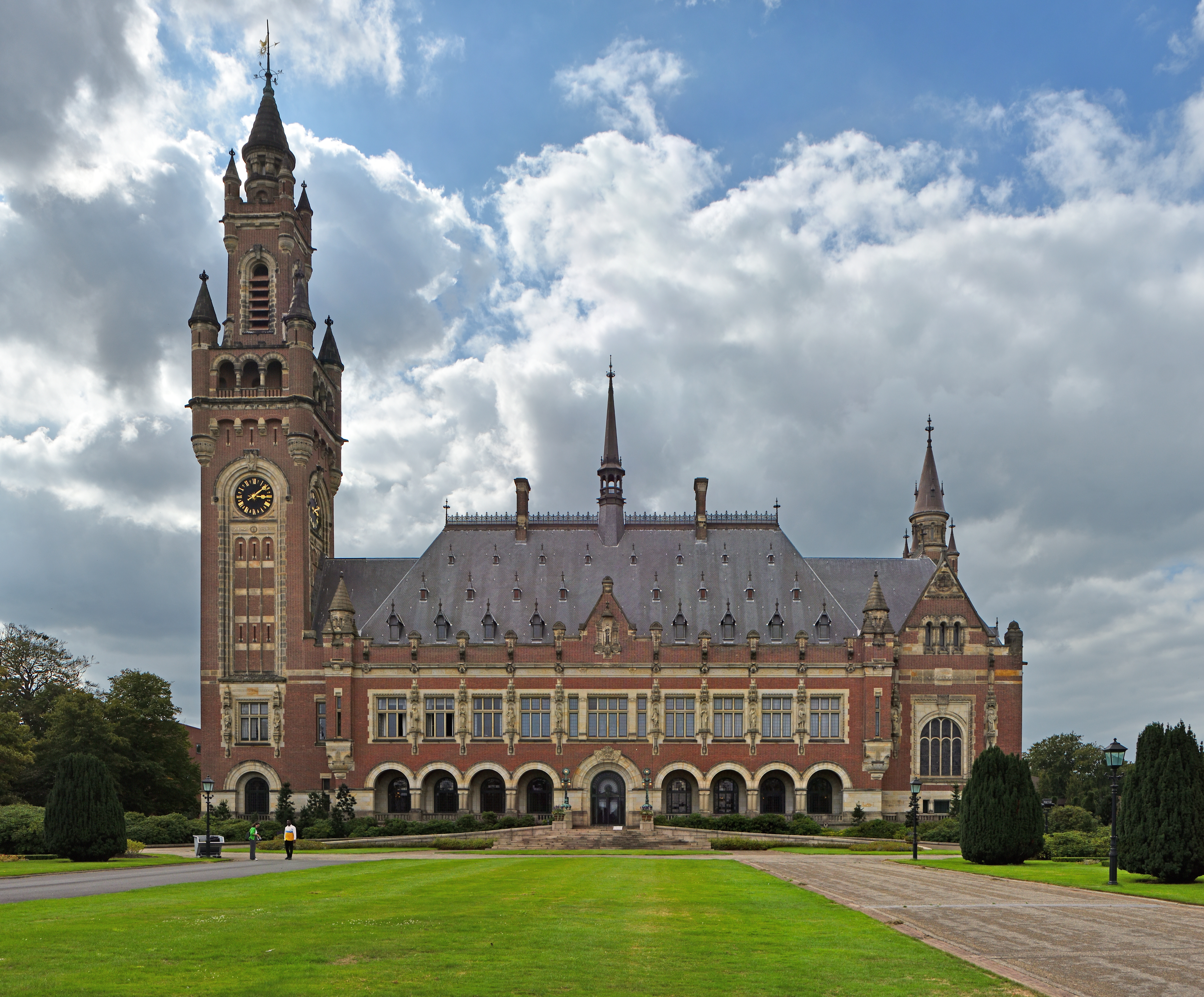
The Peace Palace (Vredespaleis), in The Hague

The history of Dutch foreign policy has been characterised by its neutrality. According to the 2024 Global Peace Index, it is the 18th most peaceful country in the world. Since World War II, the Netherlands has become a member of a large number of international organisations, most prominently the UN, NATO and the EU.

Foreign policy is based on four basic commitments: to Atlantic co-operation, to European integration, to international development and to international law. One of the more controversial international issues is the liberal policy towards soft drugs. The historical ties inherited from its colonial past in Indonesia and Suriname still influence foreign relations. Many with heritage from these countries live permanently in the Netherlands.

=== Military ===
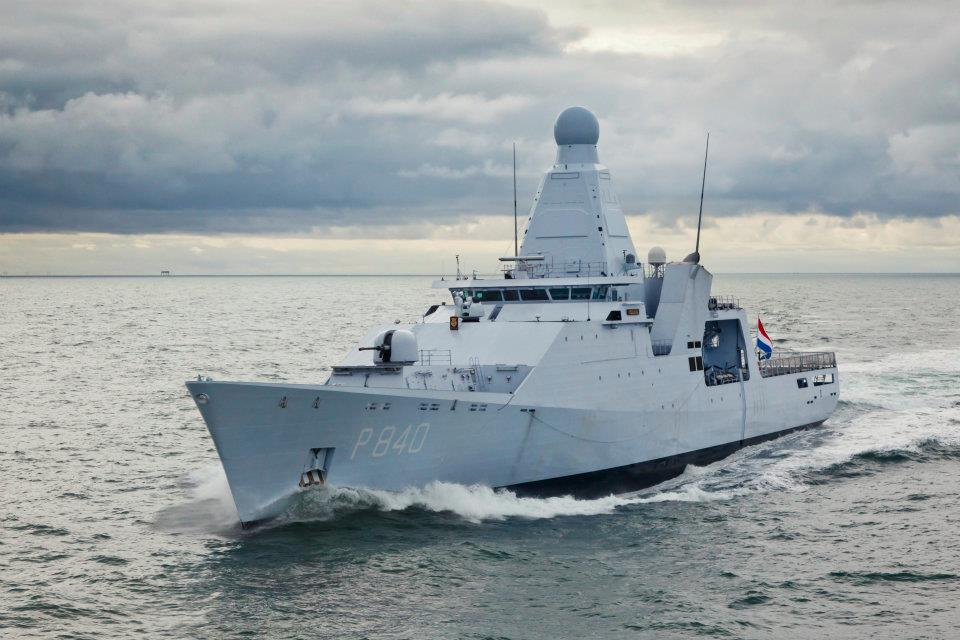
Holland-class offshore patrol vessel of the Royal Netherlands Navy

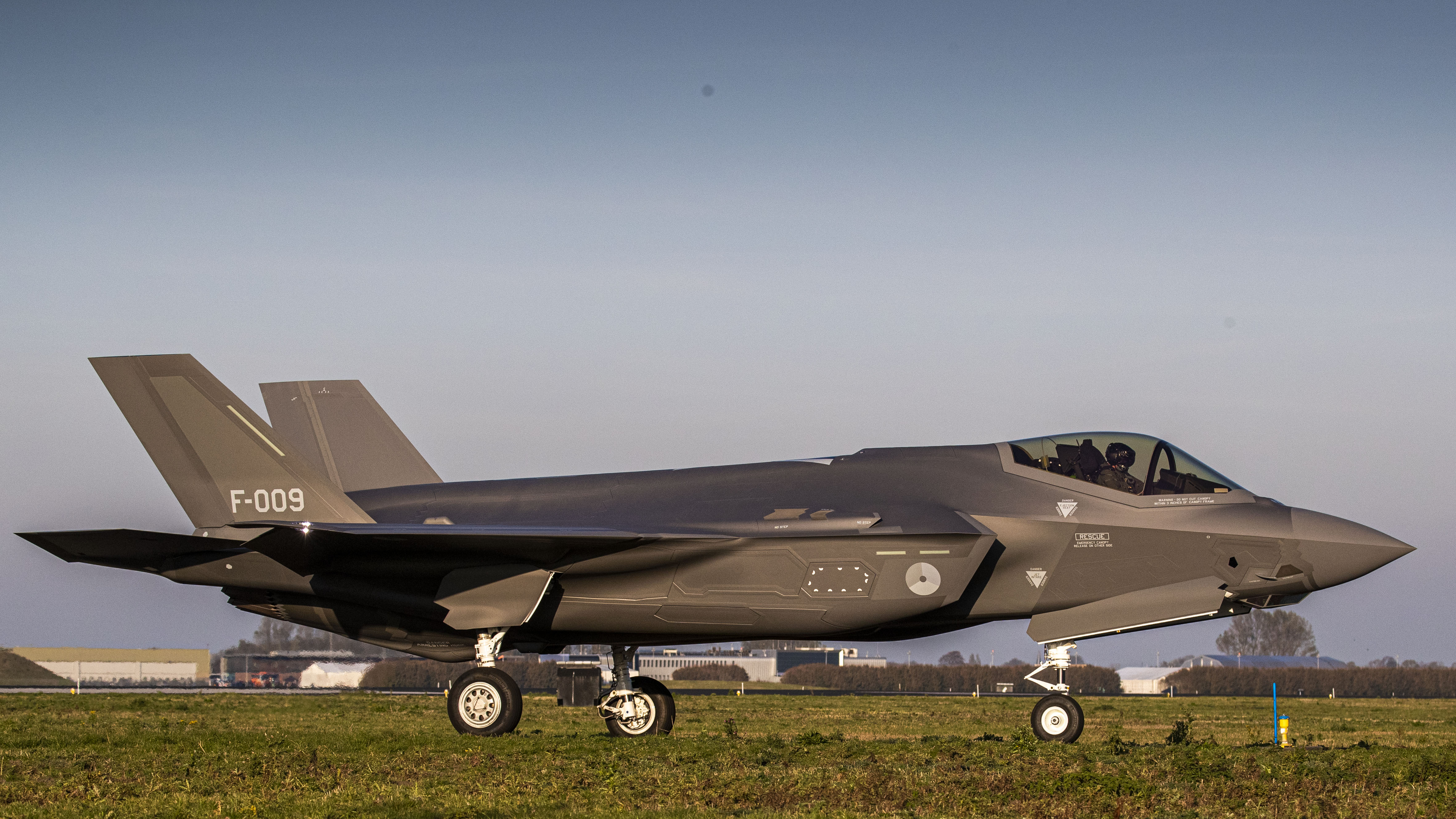
F-35 Lightning II of the Royal Netherlands Air Force

The Netherlands has one of the oldest standing armies in Europe; it was first established in the late 16th century. After the defeat of Napoleon, the Dutch army was transformed into a conscription army. The Netherlands abandoned its neutrality in 1948 when it signed the Treaty of Brussels and became a founding member of NATO in 1949. The Dutch military was therefore part of the NATO strength in Cold War Europe. In 1983 the (ceremonial) function of commander of chief of the monarch was transferred to the government, which means the monarch (nominal head of state) has no formal military function.

In 1996 conscription was suspended, and the Dutch army was once again transformed into a professional army. Since the 1990s the Dutch army has been involved in the Bosnian War and the Kosovo War, it held a province in Iraq after the defeat of Saddam Hussein, and it was engaged in Afghanistan. The Netherlands has ratified many international conventions concerning war law but did not sign the UN treaty on the Prohibition of Nuclear Weapons.

The military is composed of four branches, all of which carry the prefix Koninklijke (Royal):

- Koninklijke Marine (KM), the Royal Netherlands Navy, including the Naval Air Service and Marine Corps;
- Koninklijke Landmacht (KL), the Royal Netherlands Army;
- Koninklijke Luchtmacht (KLu), the Royal Netherlands Air and Space Force;
- Koninklijke Marechaussee (KMar), the Royal Marechaussee (Military Police), tasks include military police and border control.

The submarine service opened to women in 2017. The Korps Commandotroepen special forces is open to women, but because of the extremely high physical demands for initial training, it is almost impossible for a woman to become a commando. The Dutch Ministry of Defence employs more than 70,000 personnel, including over 20,000 civilians and over 50,000 military personnel.

== Economy ==
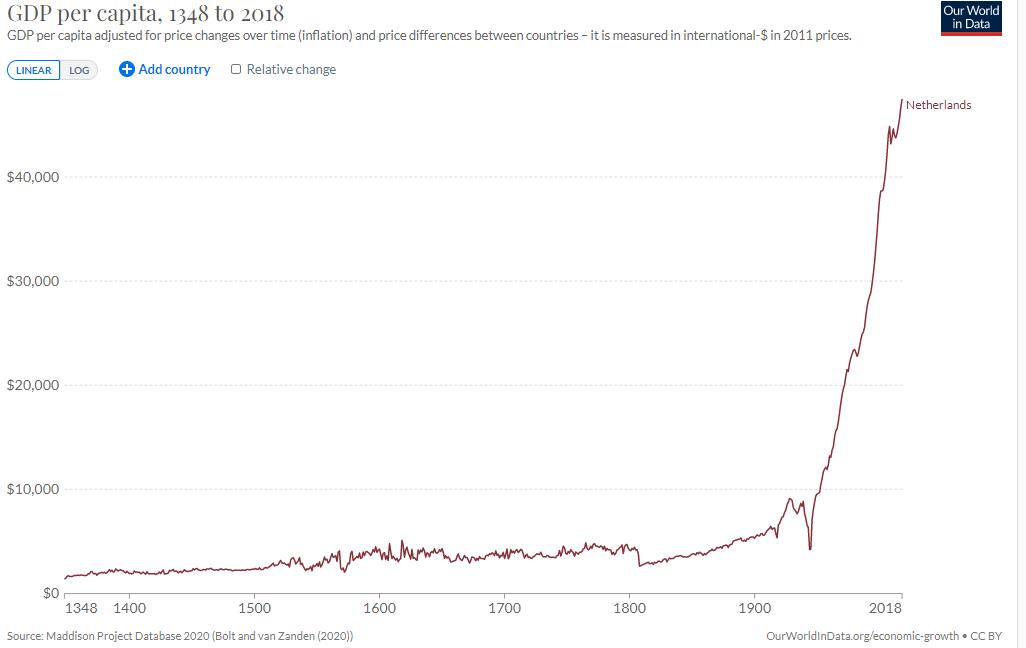
Historical GDP per capita development (Our World in Data)

Since the 16th century, shipping, fishing, agriculture, trade, and banking have been leading sectors. The Netherlands has a high level of economic freedom; it is one of the top countries in the Global Enabling Trade Report (2nd in 2016) and was ranked the fifth most competitive economy in the world by the Swiss International Institute for Management Development in 2017.

Key trading partners include Germany, Belgium, the United Kingdom, the United States, France, Italy, China and Russia. The Netherlands is one of the world's 10 leading exporting countries. Foodstuffs form the largest industrial sector. Other major industries include chemicals, metallurgy, machinery, electrical goods, trade, services and tourism. Examples of international Dutch companies operating in the Netherlands include Randstad NV, Heineken, KLM, financial services (ING, ABN AMRO, Rabobank), chemicals (DSM, AKZO), petroleum refining (Shell plc), electronic machinery (Philips, ASML), and satellite navigation (TomTom).

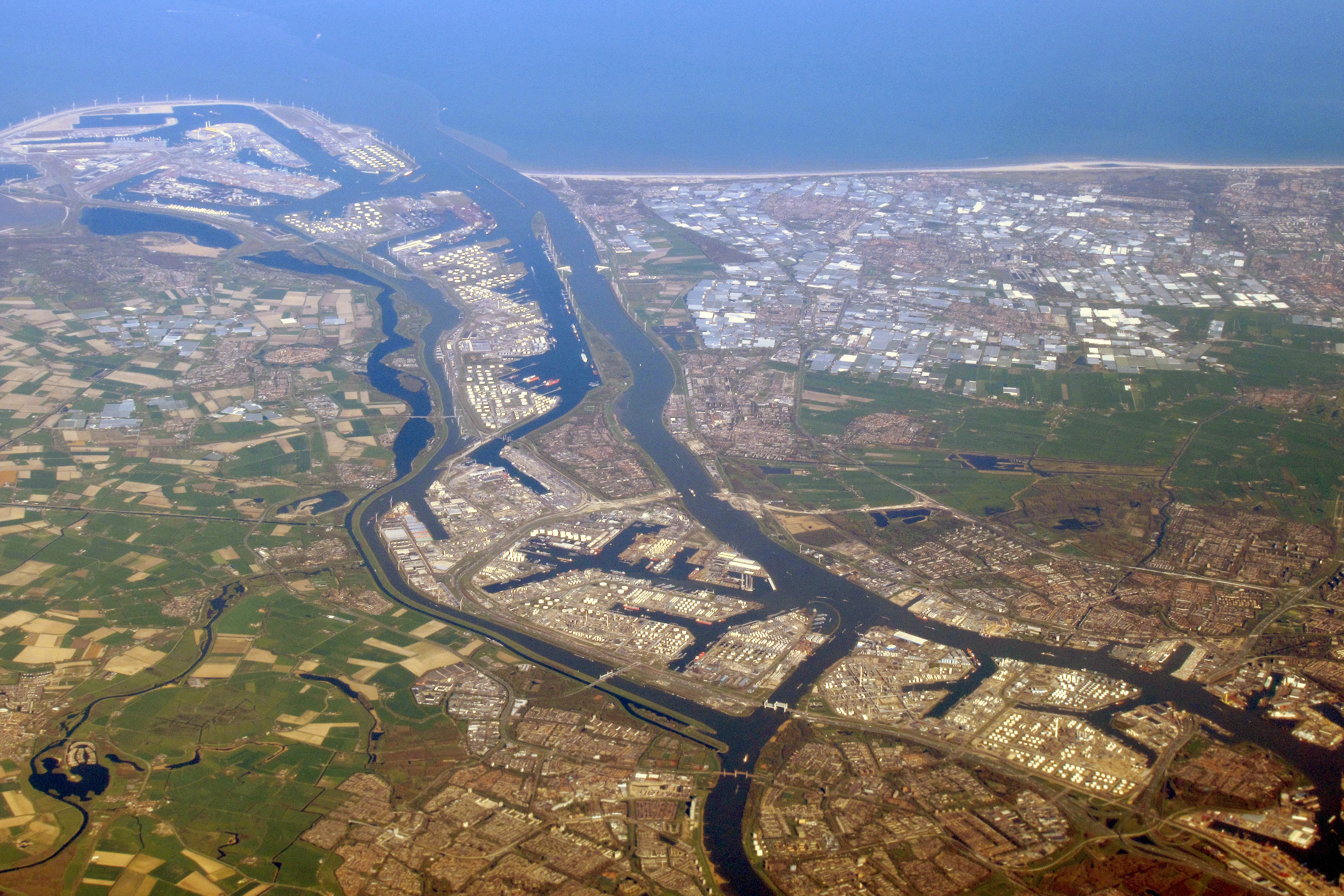
The Port of Rotterdam is Europe's largest port.

The Netherlands has the 17th-largest economy in the world and ranks 11th in GDP (nominal) per capita. Income inequality is low, but wealth inequality is relatively high. Despite ranking 11th in GDP per capita, UNICEF ranked the Netherlands first in child well-being in rich countries in 2007 and in 2013.

Amsterdam is the financial and business capital. The Amsterdam Stock Exchange (AEX), part of Euronext, is the world's oldest stock exchange and is one of Europe's largest bourses. As a founding member of the euro, the Netherlands replaced (for accounting purposes) its former currency, the "gulden" (guilder), in 1999. In the Caribbean Netherlands, the United States dollar is used instead. The Netherlands is a "conduit country" that helps to funnel profits from high-tax countries to tax havens. It has been ranked as the 4th largest tax haven in the world.

The Netherlands is part of a monetary union, the eurozone (dark blue), and the EU single market.

The Dutch location gives it prime access to markets in the United Kingdom and Germany, the Port of Rotterdam being the largest port in Europe. Other important parts of the economy are international trade, banking and transport. The Netherlands successfully addressed the issue of public finances and stagnating job growth long before its European partners. Amsterdam is the 5th-busiest tourist destination in Europe, with more than 4.2 million international visitors. Since the enlargement of the EU, large numbers of migrant workers have arrived in the Netherlands from Central and Eastern Europe.

The Netherlands continues to be one of the leading European nations for attracting foreign direct investment and is one of the five largest investors in the United States. The Netherlands is the fourth-most competitive economy in the world, according to the World Economic Forum's 2013 Global Competitiveness Report.

=== Energy ===
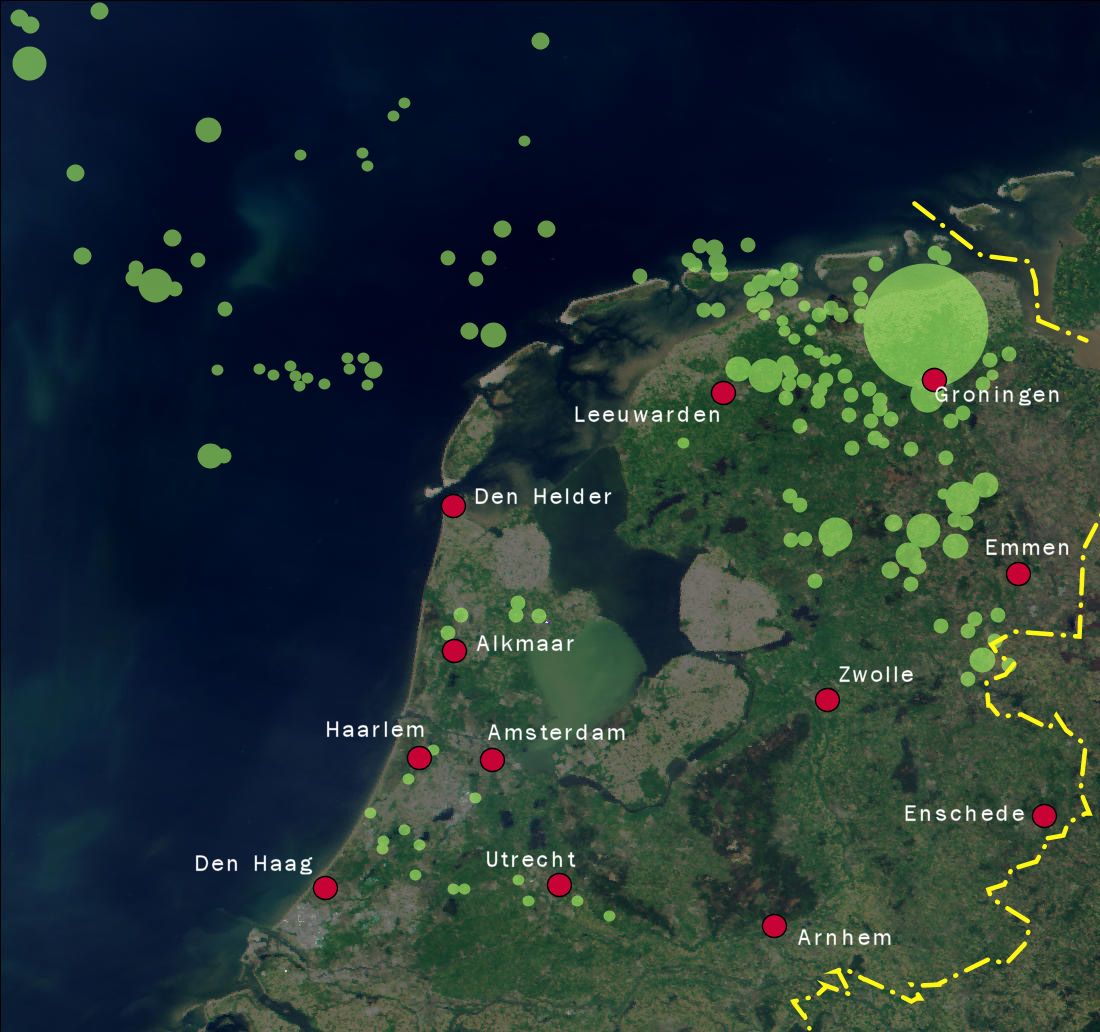
Natural gas concessions in the Netherlands. The Netherlands accounts for more than 25% of all natural gas reserves in the EU.

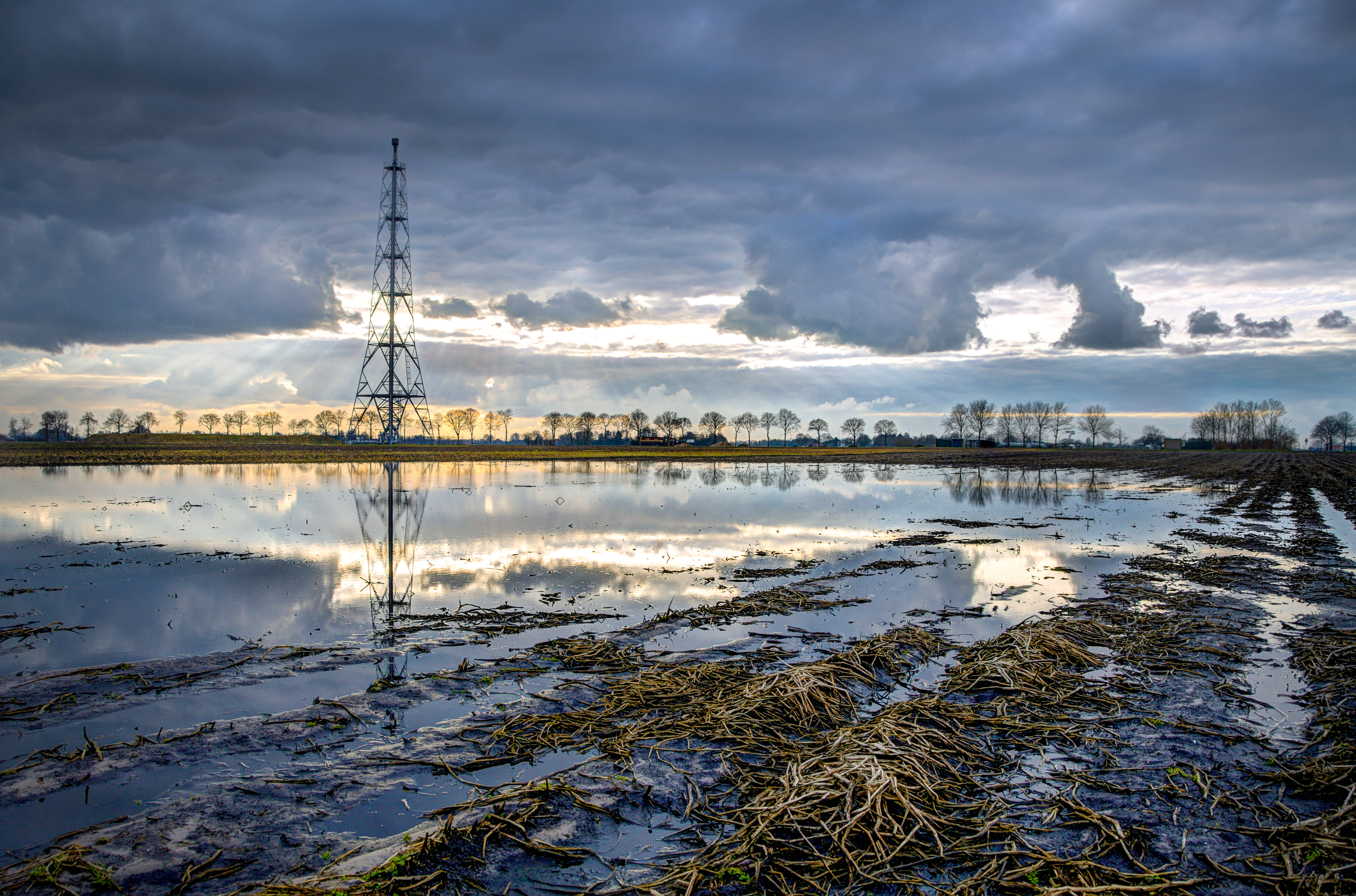
The Groningen gas field, whose discovery in 1959 transformed the Dutch economy, is one of the largest natural-gas fields in the world.

Beginning in the 1950s, huge natural gas resources were discovered, which generated enormous revenues for decades, adding hundreds of billions of euros to the government's budget, about 1.5% of GNP. However, the unforeseen consequences of the huge energy wealth affected the competitiveness of other sectors, leading to the theory of Dutch disease. The gas field is operated by government-owned Gasunie, and output is jointly exploited by the government, Royal Dutch Shell, and ExxonMobil. Gas production caused earthquakes which damaged housing. After a large public backlash, the government decided to phase out gas production from the field.

The Netherlands has made notable progress in its transition to a carbon-neutral economy. Thanks to increasing energy efficiency, energy demand shows signs of decoupling from economic growth. The share of energy from renewable sources doubled from 2008 to 2019, with especially strong growth in offshore wind and rooftop solar. However, the Netherlands remains heavily reliant on fossil fuels and has a concentration of energy- and emission-intensive industries that will not be easy to decarbonise. Its 2019 Climate Agreement defines policies and measures to support the achievement of climate targets and was developed through a collaborative process involving parties from across society. As of 2018, the Netherlands had one of the highest rates of carbon dioxide emissions per person in the European Union.

=== Agriculture and natural resources ===
The agricultural sector is highly mechanised and has a strong focus on international exports. It employs about 4% of the Dutch labour force but produces large surpluses in the food-processing industry and accounts for 21% of the total export value. The Dutch rank first in the European Union and second worldwide in value of agricultural exports, behind only the United States, with agricultural exports earning €94.5 billion in 2019. In an effort to reduce agricultural pollution, the government imposes strict limits on the productivity of the farming sector, which has triggered Dutch farmers' protests.

One-third of the world's exports of chilis, tomatoes, and cucumbers go through the country. The Netherlands exports 7% of the world's apples. A significant portion of agricultural exports consists of fresh-cut plants, flowers, and flower bulbs, totaling two-thirds of world output.

Biocapacity is 0.8 global hectares per person in 2016, 0.2 of which are dedicated to agriculture. The biocapacity per person is just about half of the 1.6 global hectares of biocapacity per person available worldwide. In contrast, in 2016, the Dutch used on average 4.8 global hectares of biocapacity – their ecological footprint of consumption. As a result, the Netherlands was running a biocapacity deficit of 4.0 global hectares per person in 2016.

=== Transport ===
Mobility on roads has grown continuously since the 1950s and now exceeds 200 billion km travelled per year, three quarters of which are done by car. Around half of all trips are made by car, 25% by bicycle, 20% walking, and 5% by public transport.

==== Road transport ====
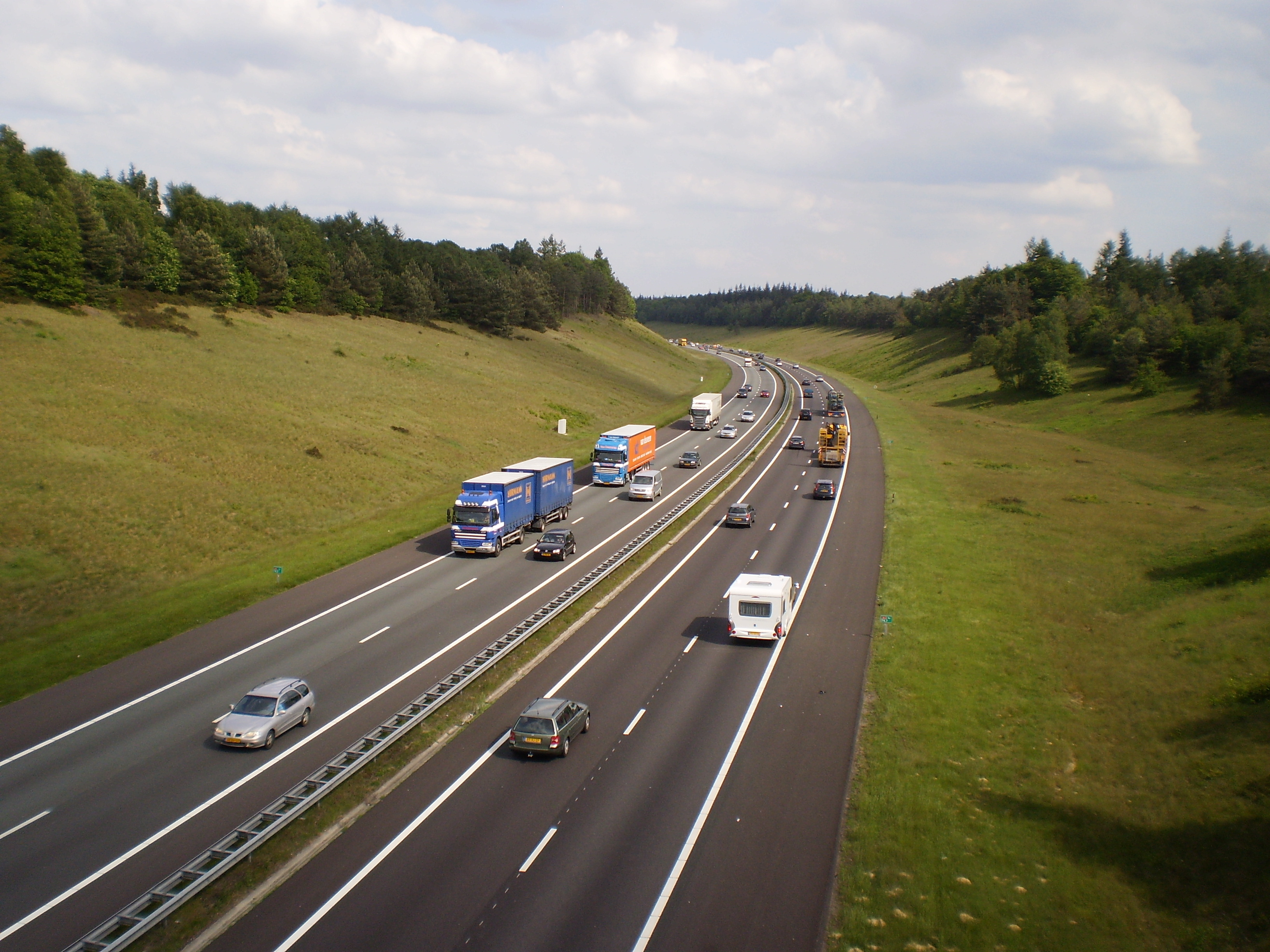
A1 motorway, in Gelderland

The Netherlands has one of the densest road networks in the world. The Netherlands has a relatively high uptake of electric vehicles, as the government implemented ambitious policy on both charging infrastructure and tax benefits. As of 2019, the Netherlands hosts approximately 30% of all recharging stations in the European Union. Moreover, newly sold cars have on average the lowest CO_{2} emissions in the EU.

==== Public transport ====
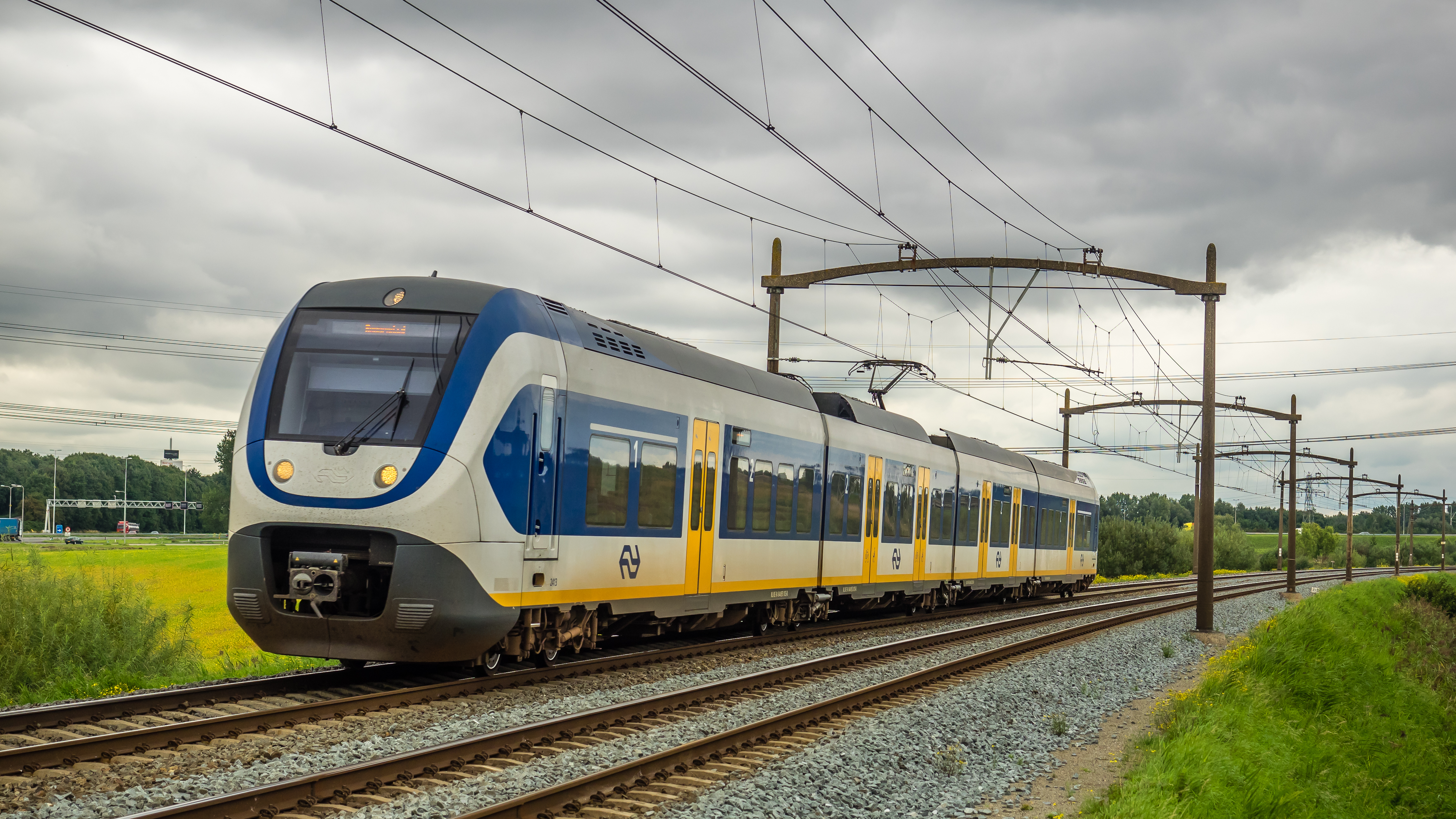
A regional train operated by Nederlandse Spoorwegen

About 13% of all distance is travelled by public transport, the majority of which is by train. The rail network of 3,013 km (1,872 mi) route is also rather dense. The network is mostly focused on passenger rail services and connects all major cities, with over 400 stations. Trains are frequent, with two trains per hour on lesser lines, (Note: Only 11 stations are served less than twice an hour during weekdays.) two to four trains per hour on average, and up to eight trains an hour on the busiest lines. The train network includes the HSL-Zuid, a high-speed line between the Amsterdam metropolitan area and the Belgian border for trains running from Paris and London, to the Netherlands.

==== Cycling ====
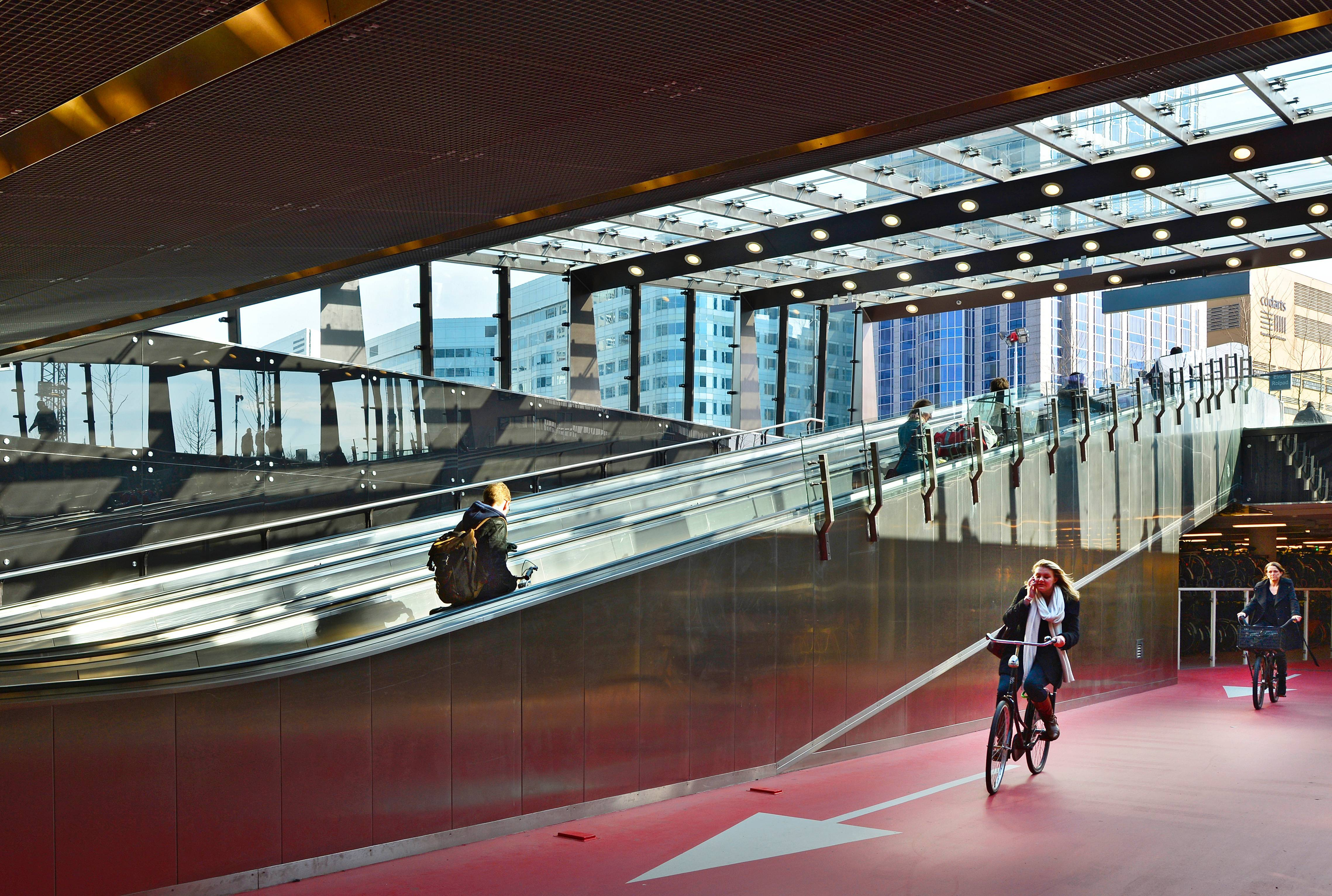
Bike passage at Rotterdam Centraal station

Cycling is a ubiquitous mode of transport. Almost as many kilometres are covered by bicycle as by train. The Dutch are estimated to have at least 18 million bicycles, which makes more than one per capita and twice as many as the circa 9 million motor vehicles on the road. In 2013, the European Cyclists' Federation ranked the Netherlands and Denmark as the most bike-friendly countries in Europe. Cycling infrastructure is extensive. Busy roads have received some 35,000 km of dedicated cycle tracks, physically segregated from motorised traffic. Busy junctions are often equipped with bicycle-specific traffic lights. There are large bicycle parking facilities, particularly in city centres and train stations.

==== Water transport ====
The Port of Rotterdam is the largest port in Europe and the largest port outside East Asia, the rivers Meuse and Rhine providing excellent access to the hinterland upstream. As of 2022, Rotterdam was the world's tenth largest container port. The main activities are petrochemical industries and general cargo handling and transshipment. The harbour functions as an important transit point for bulk materials and between the European continent and overseas. The Volkeraksluizen between Rotterdam and Antwerp are the biggest sluices for inland navigation in terms of tonnage. In 2007, the Betuweroute, a fast freight railway from Rotterdam to Germany, was completed. Amsterdam is Europe's 4th largest port. The inland shipping fleet is the largest in Europe. Passenger boats include a ferry network in Amsterdam and waterbusses and taxis in Rotterdam.

==== Air transport ====
Schiphol Airport, southwest of Amsterdam, is the main international airport and the fourth busiest airport in Europe by number of passengers. Schiphol is the main hub for KLM, the flag carrier and the world's oldest airline. In 2016, the Royal Schiphol Group airports handled 70 million passengers. All air traffic is international, and Schiphol Airport is connected to over 300 destinations worldwide, more than any other European airport. The airport is a major freight hub as well, processing 1.44 million tonnes of cargo in 2020. Smaller international airports are in or near Eindhoven, Rotterdam, Maastricht and Groningen. Air transport is of vital significance for the Caribbean Netherlands, all islands having their own airports. This includes the shortest runway in the world on Saba.

== Demographics ==
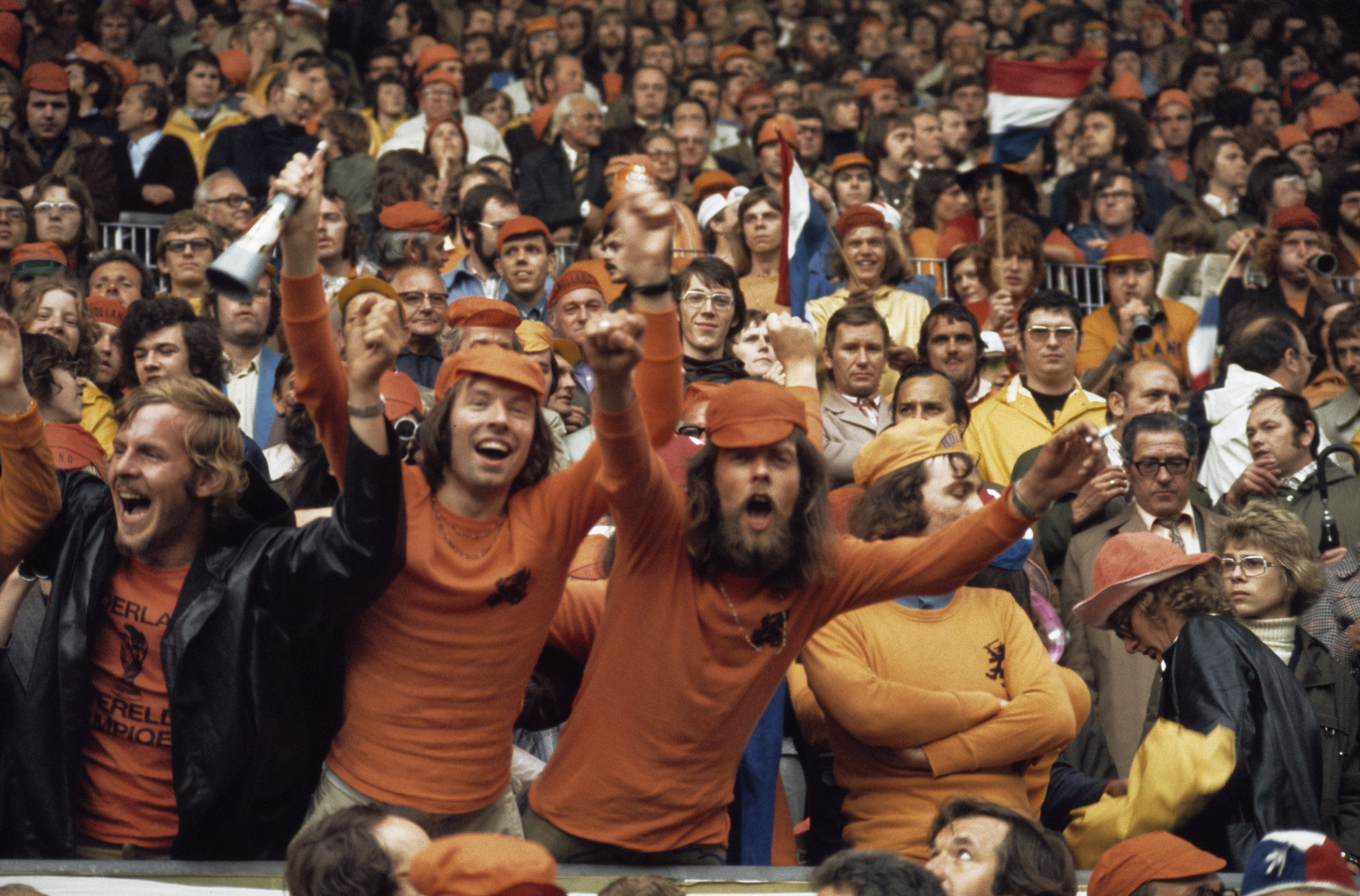
Dutch people in 1974

The Netherlands had an estimated population of 18,080,943 as of June 2025. It is the 6th most densely populated country in Europe and the 33rd most densely populated country in the world with a density of 424 per square kilometre (1,100/sq mi). Between 1900 and 1950, the population almost doubled from 5.1 to 10 million. From 1950 to 2000, the population further increased, to 15.9 million.

The fertility rate is 1.39 children per woman (2024), which is high compared with many other European countries but below the rate of 2.1 children per woman required for natural population replacement. The Netherlands has one of the oldest populations in the world, with the average age of 42.7 years. Life expectancy is high: 84.3 years for newborn girls and 79.7 for boys (2020 estimate). The Dutch are the tallest people in the world by nationality, with an average height of 1.81 metres (5 ft 11.3 in) for men and 1.67 metres (5 ft 5.7 in) for women in 2009. The average height of young men increased from 5 feet, 4 inches to approximately 6 feet between the 1850s until the early 2000s.

The migration rate is 1.9 migrants per 1,000 inhabitants per year. The majority of the population is ethnically Dutch. In 2022, the population was 74.8% ethnically Dutch, 8.3% other European, 2.4% Turkish, 2.4% Moroccan, 2.0% Indonesian, 2.0% Surinamese, and 8.1% others. Some 150,000 to 200,000 people living in the Netherlands are expatriates, mostly concentrated in and around Amsterdam and The Hague, constituting almost 10% of the population of these cities. Significant minorities in the country include Frisians 700,000, Jews 41,000-45,000 and the Roma and the Sinti 40,000.

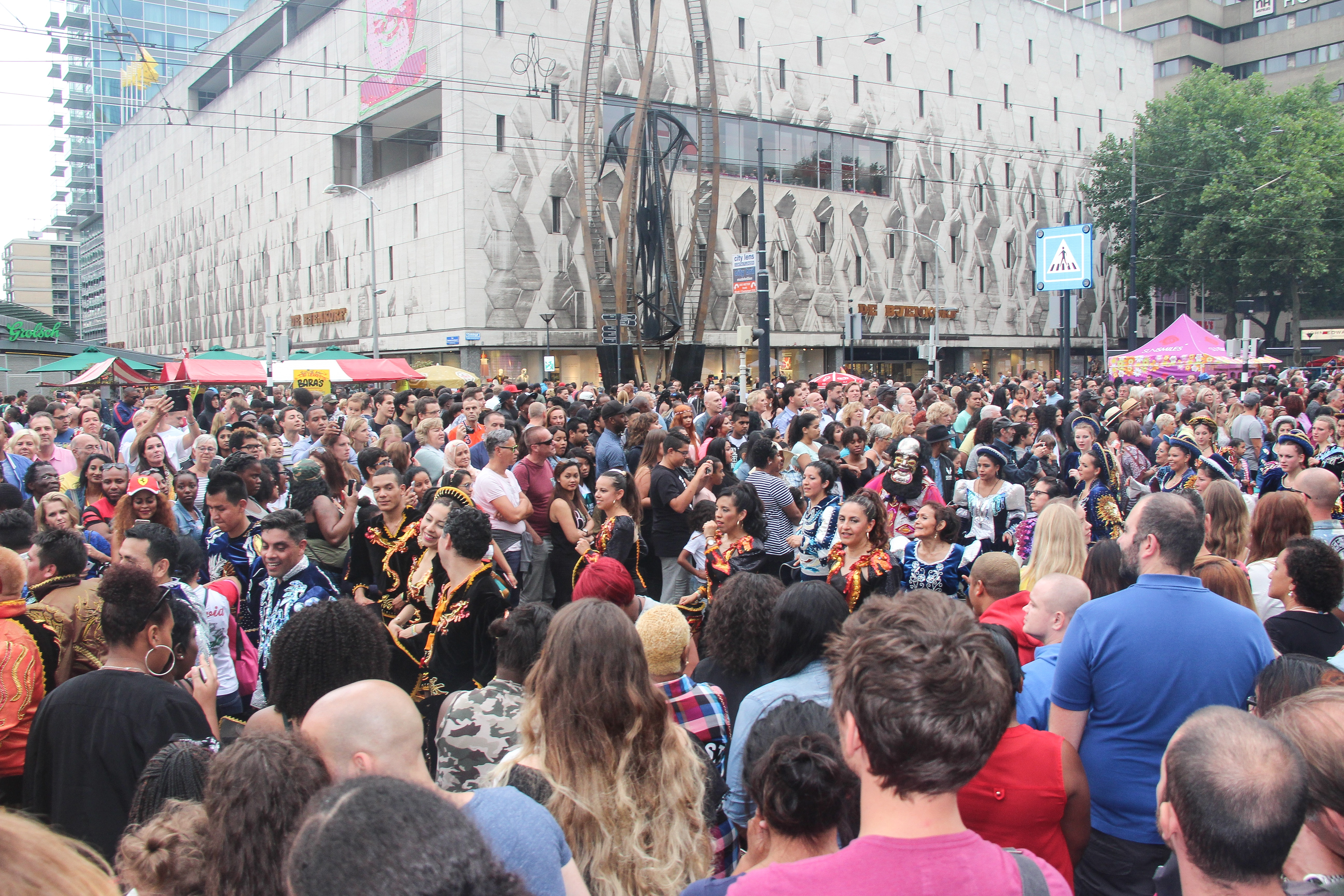
In Rotterdam, almost half the population has an immigrant background.

According to Eurostat, in 2010 there were 1.8 million foreign-born residents, corresponding to 11.1% of the total population. Of these, 1.4 million (8.5%) were born outside the EU and 0.43 million (2.6%) were born in another EU member state. In 2022, there were 4.4 million residents with at least one foreign-born parent. Over half the young people in Amsterdam and Rotterdam have a non-western background, as of 2006. Dutch people, or descendants of Dutch people, are found in migrant communities worldwide, notably in South Africa and the United States.

The Randstad contains the four largest cities: Amsterdam, Rotterdam, The Hague, and Utrecht; with a population of about 8.2 million it is the 5th largest metropolitan area in Europe. According to Dutch Central Statistics Bureau, in 2015, 28 per cent of the Dutch population had a spendable income above 45,000 euros (which does not include spending on health care or education).

Largest municipalities in the Netherlands Statistics Netherlands
Rank	Name	Province	Pop.	Rank	Name	Province	Pop.
1	Amsterdam	North Holland	931,298	11	Apeldoorn	Gelderland	168,211
2	Rotterdam	South Holland	670,610	12	Haarlem	North Holland	167,636
3	The Hague	South Holland	566,221	13	Arnhem	Gelderland	167,632
4	Utrecht	Utrecht	374,238	14	Haarlemmermeer	North Holland	163,128
5	Eindhoven	North Brabant	246,417	15	Amersfoort	Utrecht	161,852
6	Groningen	Groningen	243,768	16	Enschede	Overijssel	161,738
7	Tilburg	North Brabant	229,836	17	Zaanstad	North Holland	161,389
8	Almere	Flevoland	226,500	18	's-Hertogenbosch	North Brabant	160,757
9	Breda	North Brabant	188,078	19	Zwolle	Overijssel	133,141
10	Nijmegen	Gelderland	187,049	20	Leeuwarden	Friesland	128,810

=== Language ===
Knowledge of foreign languages in the Netherlands, among population 15 and older, in 2006

The official language is Dutch, which is spoken by the vast majority of inhabitants. The dialects most spoken are the Brabantian-Hollandic dialects. Besides Dutch, West Frisian is recognised as a second official language in the northern province of Friesland (Fryslân in West Frisian). West Frisian has a formal status for government correspondence in that province. Five other languages are protected under the European Charter for Regional or Minority Languages. The first of these recognised regional languages is Low Saxon (Nedersaksisch in Dutch). Low Saxon consists of several dialects of the Low German language spoken in the north and east of the Netherlands, like Tweants in the region of Twente, and Drents in the province of Drenthe.

Limburgish is recognised as a regional language. It consists of Dutch varieties of Meuse-Rhenish and is spoken Limburg. Yiddish and the Romani language were recognised in 1996 as non-territorial languages. English has a formal status in the special municipalities of Saba and Sint Eustatius. It is widely spoken on these islands. Papiamento has a formal status in Bonaire.

The Netherlands has a long tradition of learning foreign languages, formalised in education laws. Some 90% of the total population are able to converse in English, 70% in German, and 29% in French. English is a mandatory course in all secondary schools. In most lower level secondary school educations (vmbo), one additional modern foreign language is mandatory during the first two years. In higher level secondary schools (havo and vwo), the acquisition of two additional modern foreign language skills is mandatory. Besides English, the standard modern languages are French and German, although schools can replace one of these with Chinese, Spanish, Russian, Italian, Turkish or Arabic. Additionally, schools in Friesland teach and have exams in West Frisian.

=== Religion ===
Religious identification in the Netherlands (2025)
1. Irreligious (58%)
2. Catholic (16%)
3. Protestant (12%)
4. Muslim (6%)
5. Other religion (7%)

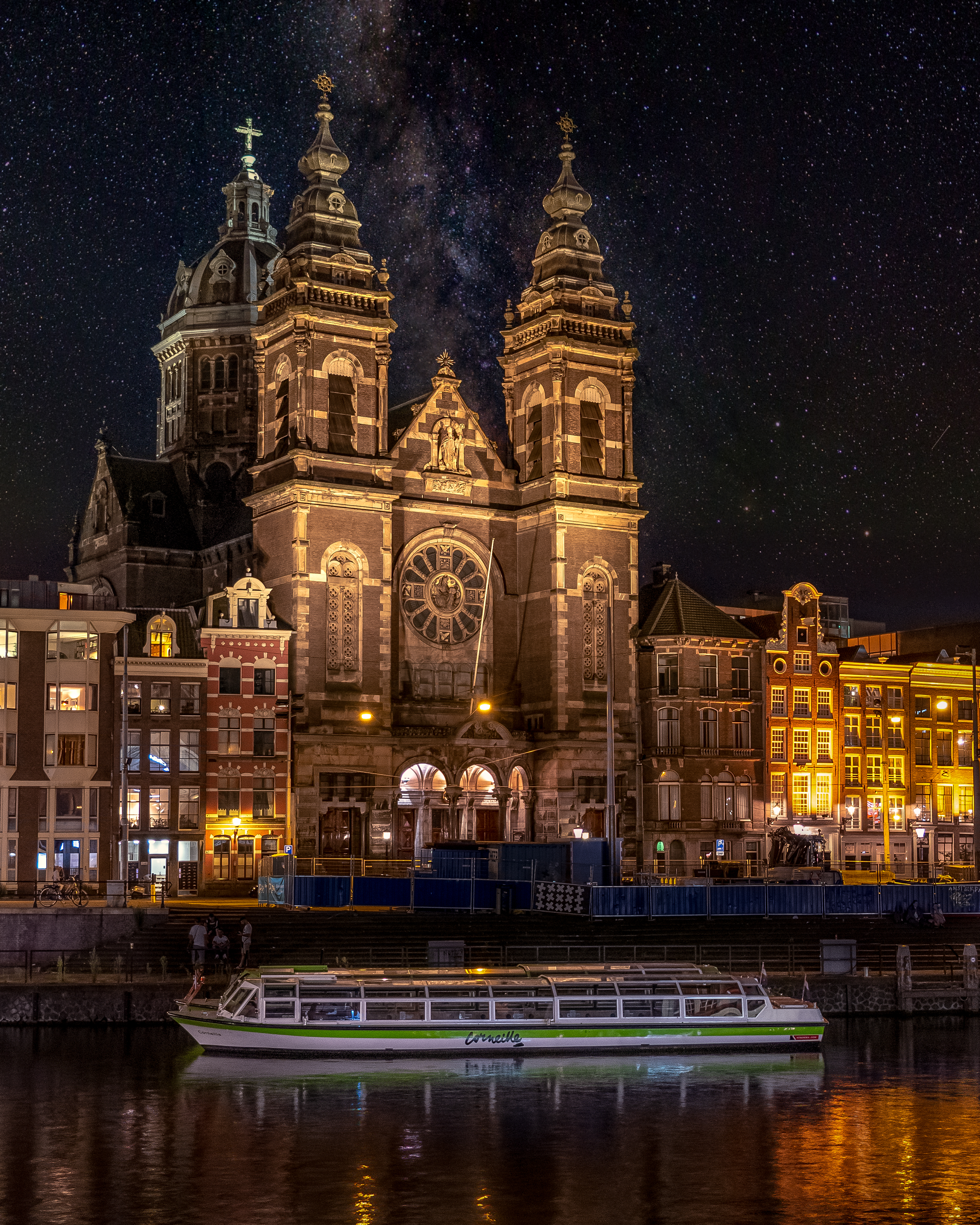
The Co-cathedral Basilica of Saint Nicholas in Amsterdam

Forms of Christianity have dominated religious life in what is now the Netherlands for more than 1,200 years, and by the middle of the 16th century the region was strongly Protestant (Calvinist). The population was predominantly Christian until the late 20th century. Although significant religious diversity remains, there has been a decline of religious adherence.

In 2025, Statistics Netherlands found that 58% of the population are non-religious, including Humanistisch Verbond. Catholics comprised 16% of the population and Protestants 12%. Muslims comprised 6% of the population, and followers of other Christian denominations and other religions (like Judaism, Buddhism and Hinduism) comprised the remaining 7%. A 2015 survey from another source found that Protestants outnumbered Catholics.

The southern provinces of North Brabant and Limburg have historically been strongly Catholic, and some residents consider the Catholic Church as a base for their cultural identity. This can be seen in for example the regional celebration of Carnival. Protestantism consists of a number of churches within various traditions. The largest of these is the Protestant Church in the Netherlands (PKN), a united church which is Calvinist and Lutheran in orientation. It was formed in 2004 as a merger of the Dutch Reformed Church, the Reformed Churches in the Netherlands and a smaller Lutheran Church. Several orthodox Calvinist and liberal churches did not merge into the PKN. Although Christianity has become a minority in the Netherlands, there is a Bible Belt from Zeeland to the northern parts of the province Overijssel, in which orthodox Protestant beliefs remain strong. Statistically, areas of the Bible Belt also have the highest fertility rates and the youngest populations in the Netherlands. Several Christian religious holidays are national holidays (Christmas, Easter, Pentecost, and the Ascension of Jesus).

Islam is the second largest religion. The Muslim population increased from the 1960 as a result of large numbers of migrant workers from Turkey and Morocco, as well as from Suriname and Indonesia. During the 1990s, Muslim refugees arrived from countries like Bosnia and Herzegovina, Iran, Iraq, Somalia, and Afghanistan. Since 2000 there has been raised awareness of religion, mainly due to Islamic extremism.

Hinduism has about 215,000 adherents (slightly over 1% of the population). Most of these are Indo-Surinamese. There are sizeable populations of Hindu immigrants from India and Sri Lanka, and Western adherents of Hinduism-orientated new religious movements such as Hare Krishnas. There are an estimated 250,000 Buddhists or people strongly attracted to this religion, mainly ethnic Dutch people. There are between 30,000 and 63,000 Jews.

The Constitution of the Netherlands guarantees freedom of education, which means that all schools that adhere to general quality criteria receive the same government funding. This includes schools based on religious principles by religious groups (especially Catholic and Protestant).

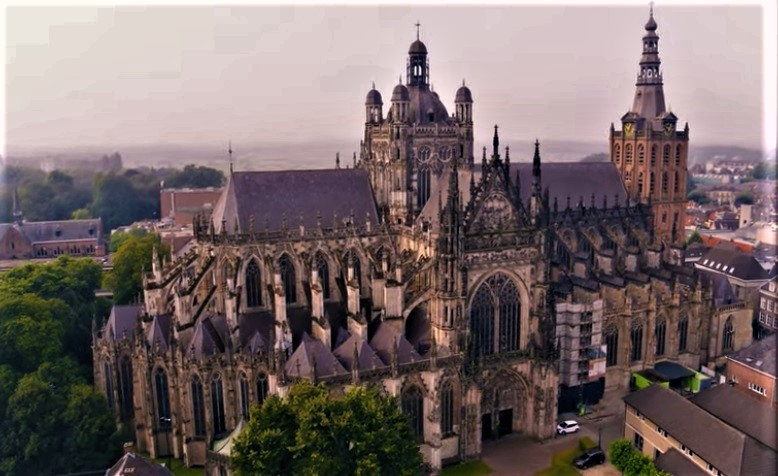
The St. John's Cathedral ('s-Hertogenbosch) in 's-Hertogenbosch

A survey in December 2014 concluded that for the first time there were more atheists (25%) than theists (17%) in the Netherlands, while the remainder of the population was agnostic (31%) or ietsistic (27%). In 2015, 82% said they had never or almost never visited a church, and 59% stated that they had never been to a church; while 24% saw themselves as atheist, an increase of 11% compared to the previous study done in 2006. The expected rise of spirituality has come to a halt according to research in 2015. In 2006, 40% of respondents considered themselves spiritual; in 2015 this has dropped to 31%. The number who believe in the existence of a higher power fell from 36% to 28% over the same period.

=== Education ===
Education in the Netherlands is compulsory between ages 5 and 16. If a child does not have a "starting qualification" (HAVO, VWO or MBO 2+ degree) they are still forced to attend classes until they achieve such a qualification or reach age 18. Children attend elementary school from (on average) ages 4 to 12. It has eight grades and the first is facultative. Based on an aptitude test, the eighth grade teacher's recommendation and the opinion of the pupil's parents or caretakers, a choice is made for one of the three main streams of secondary education.

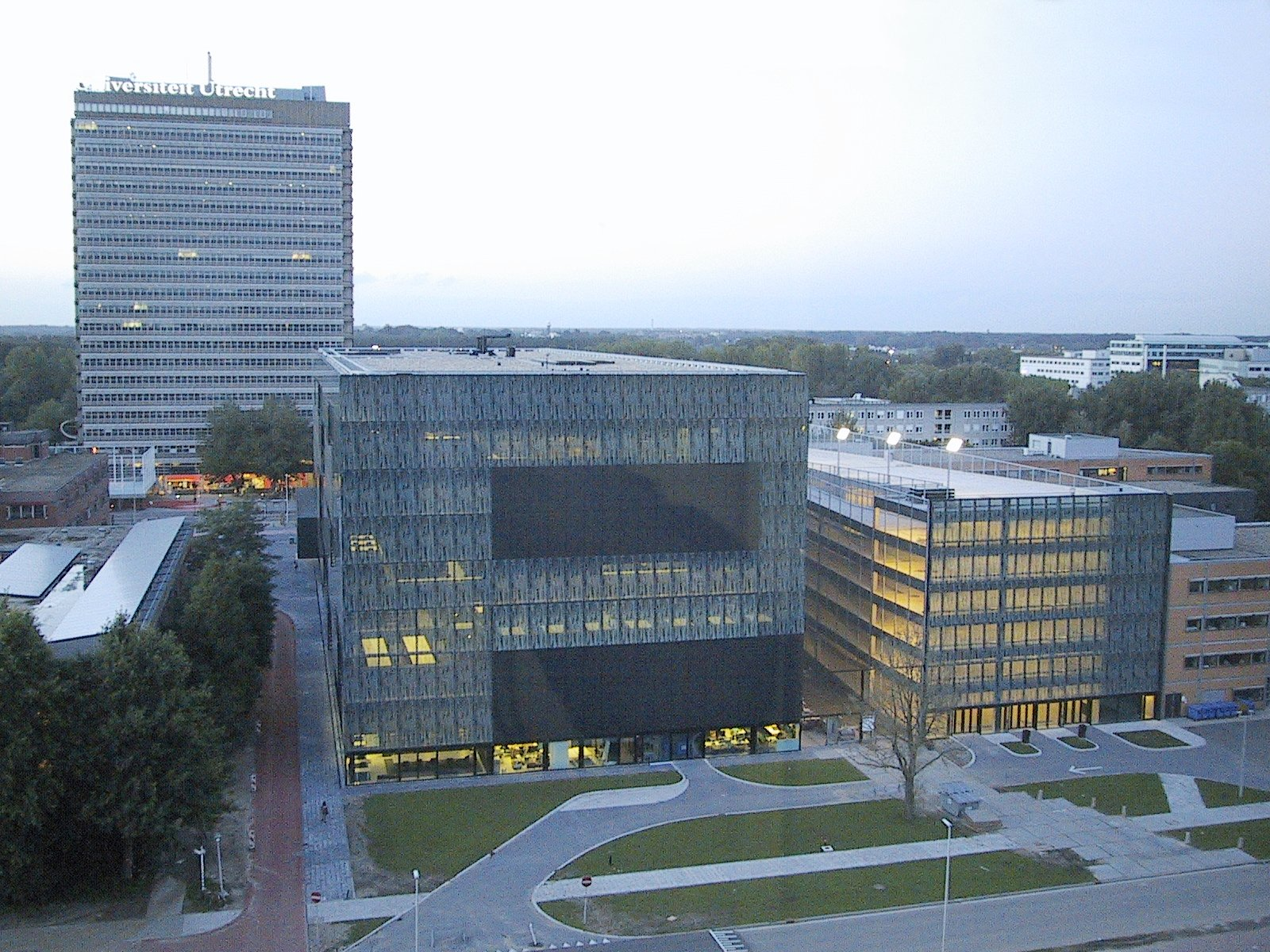
View on the Utrecht Science Park of Utrecht University. The building in the centre is the library.

The VMBO has four grades and is subdivided over several levels. Successfully completing the VMBO results in a low-level vocational degree that grants access to the MBO. The MBO (middle-level applied education) is a form of education that primarily focuses on teaching a practical trade or a vocational degree. With the MBO certification, a student can apply for the HBO. The HAVO has 5 grades and allows for admission to the HBO. The HBO (higher professional education) are universities of professional education (applied sciences) that award professional bachelor's degrees; similar to polytechnic degrees. An HBO degree gives access to the university system. The VWO (comprising atheneum and gymnasium) has 6 grades and prepares for studying at a research university. Universities offer a three-year bachelor's degree, followed by a one or two-year master's degree, which in turn can be followed by a doctoral degree programme.

Doctoral candidates are generally non-tenured employees of a university. All schools and universities are publicly funded and managed with the exception of religious schools. Universities have a tuition fee of about 2,000 euros per year for students from the Netherlands and the EU, and 15,000 euros for non-EU students.

=== Health ===
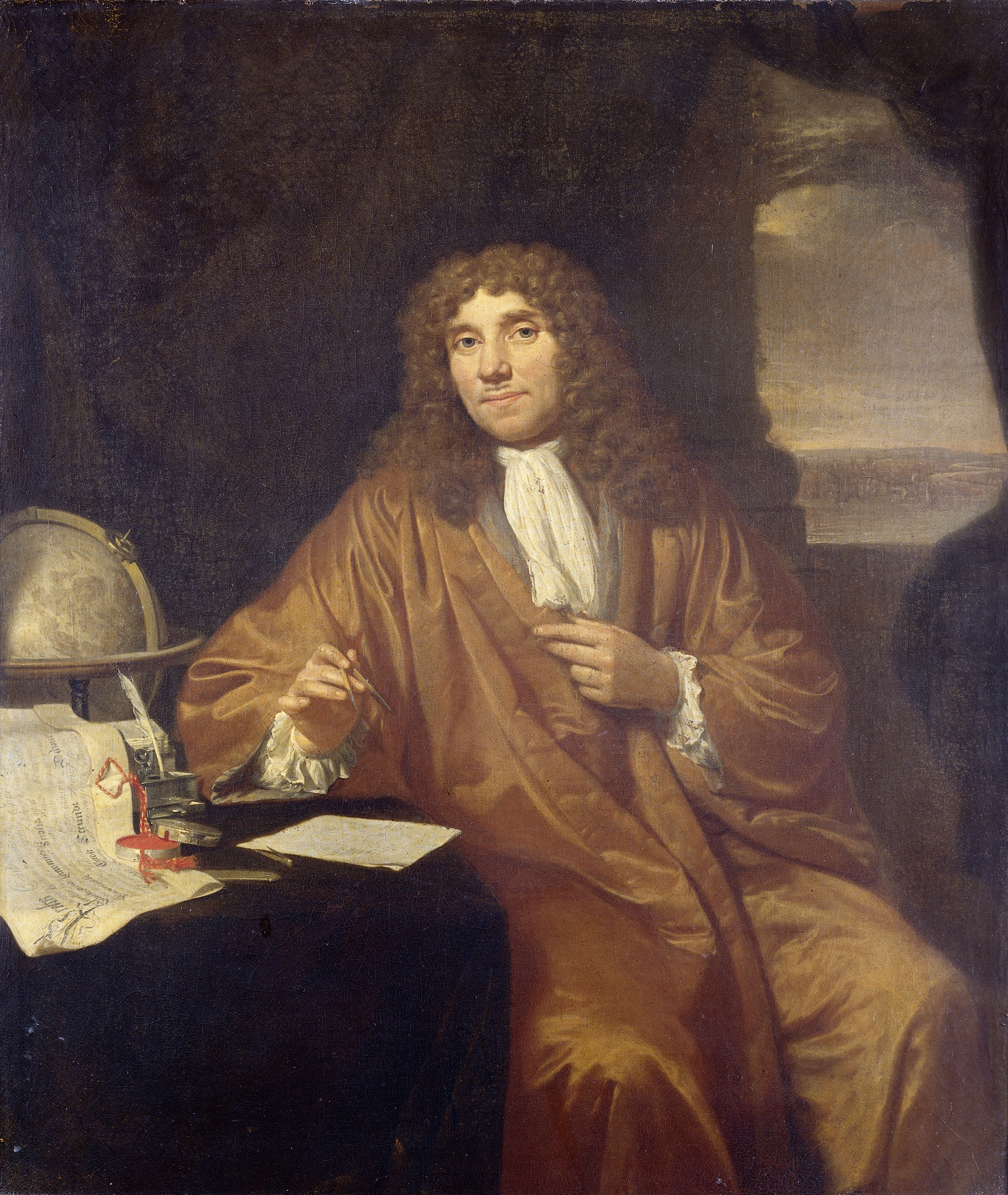
Portrait of Antonie van Leeuwenhoek (1632–1723), known as "the father of microbiology"

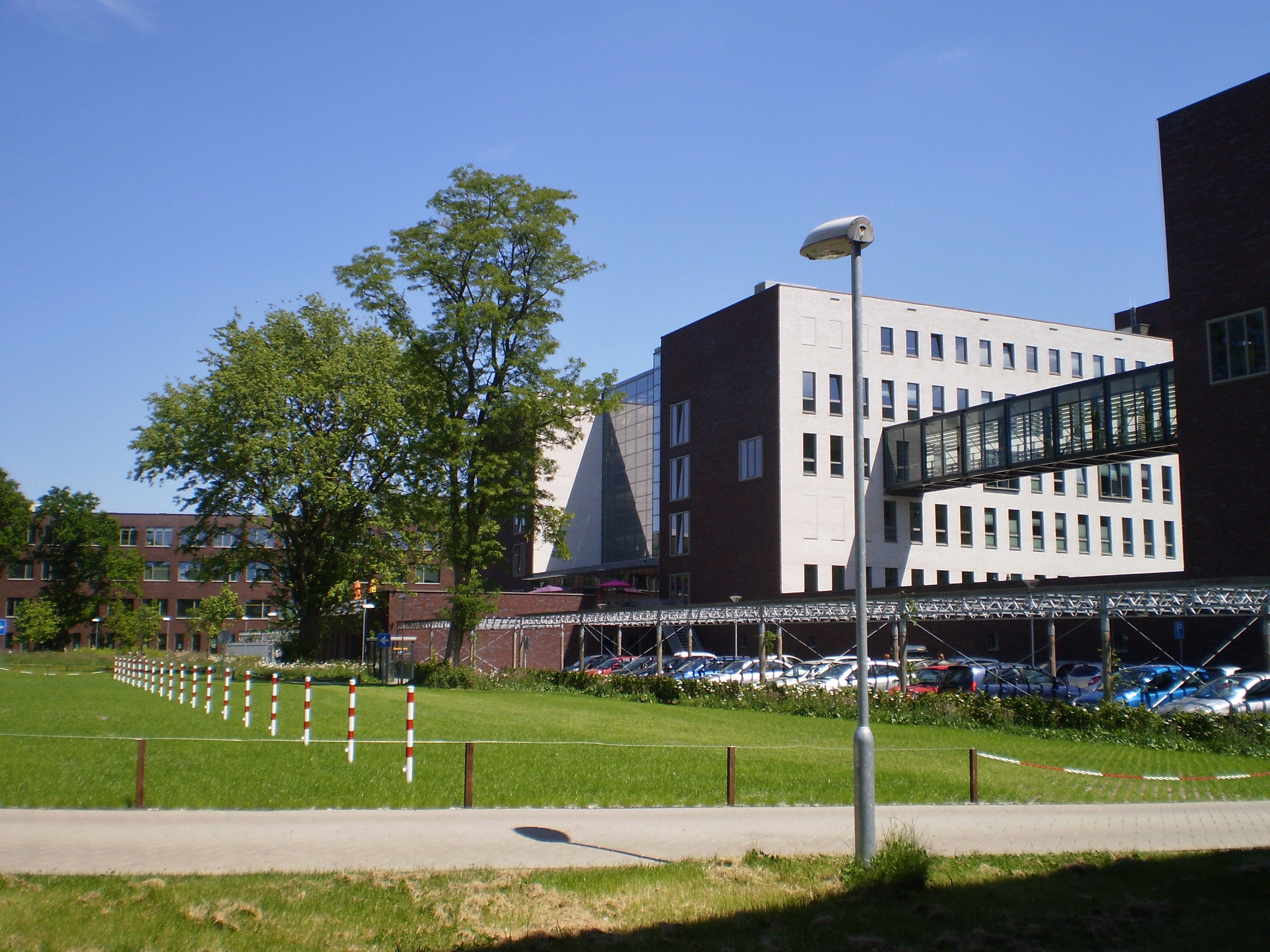
A public hospital in Amersfoort

In 2016, the Netherlands maintained its position at the top of the annual Euro Health Consumer Index, which compares healthcare systems in Europe, scoring 916 of a maximum 1,000 points. The Netherlands has been among the top three countries in each report published since 2005. On 48 indicators such as patient rights and information, accessibility, prevention and outcomes, the Netherlands secured its top position among 37 European countries for six years in a row. The Netherlands was ranked first in a study in 2009 comparing the health care systems of the United States, Australia, Canada, Germany and New Zealand.

According to the Health Consumer Powerhouse, patients have a great degree of freedom from where to buy their health insurance, to where they get their healthcare. Healthcare decisions are made in dialogue between patients and healthcare professionals. Healthcare is split 3 ways: in somatic and mental health care and in 'cure' (short term) and 'care' (long term). Home doctors (huisartsen, comparable to general practitioners) form the largest part of the first level. Being referred by a member of the first level is mandatory for access to the second and third level. The health care system is, in comparison to other Western countries, effective but not the most cost-effective. Healthcare is financed by a dual system. Long-term treatments, especially those that involve semi-permanent hospitalisation, and disability costs such as wheelchairs, are covered by a state-controlled mandatory insurance. In 2009 this insurance covered 27% of all health care expenses. Other sources of health care payment are taxes (14%), out of pocket payments (9%), additional optional health insurance packages (4%) and a range of other sources (4%). Health insurance is mandatory, and healthcare in the Netherlands is covered by two statutory forms of insurance:

- Zorgverzekeringswet (ZVW), often called "basic insurance", covers common medical care.
- Algemene Wet Bijzondere Ziektekosten (AWBZ) covers long-term nursing and care.

While residents are automatically insured by the government for AWBZ, everyone has to buy their own basic healthcare insurance, except those under 18 who are automatically covered under their parents. Insurance companies are obliged to provide a package with a defined set of insured treatments. This insurance covers 41% of all health care expenses. Insurers have to offer a universal package for everyone over 18, regardless of age or state of health – it is illegal to refuse an application or impose special conditions. The funding burden for all short-term health care coverage is carried 50% by employers, 45% by the insured person and 5% by the government. Those on low incomes receive compensation to help them pay their insurance. Premiums paid by the insured are about €135 per month.

== Culture ==
=== Dutch value system ===
The Dutch are proud of their cultural heritage, rich history in art, and involvement in international affairs. A predominant attitude is to think of the nation as being "both tolerant and cosmopolitan." A Dutch saying indicating their sense of national pride in their reclamation of land from the sea and marshes is "God created the world, but the Dutch created the Netherlands."

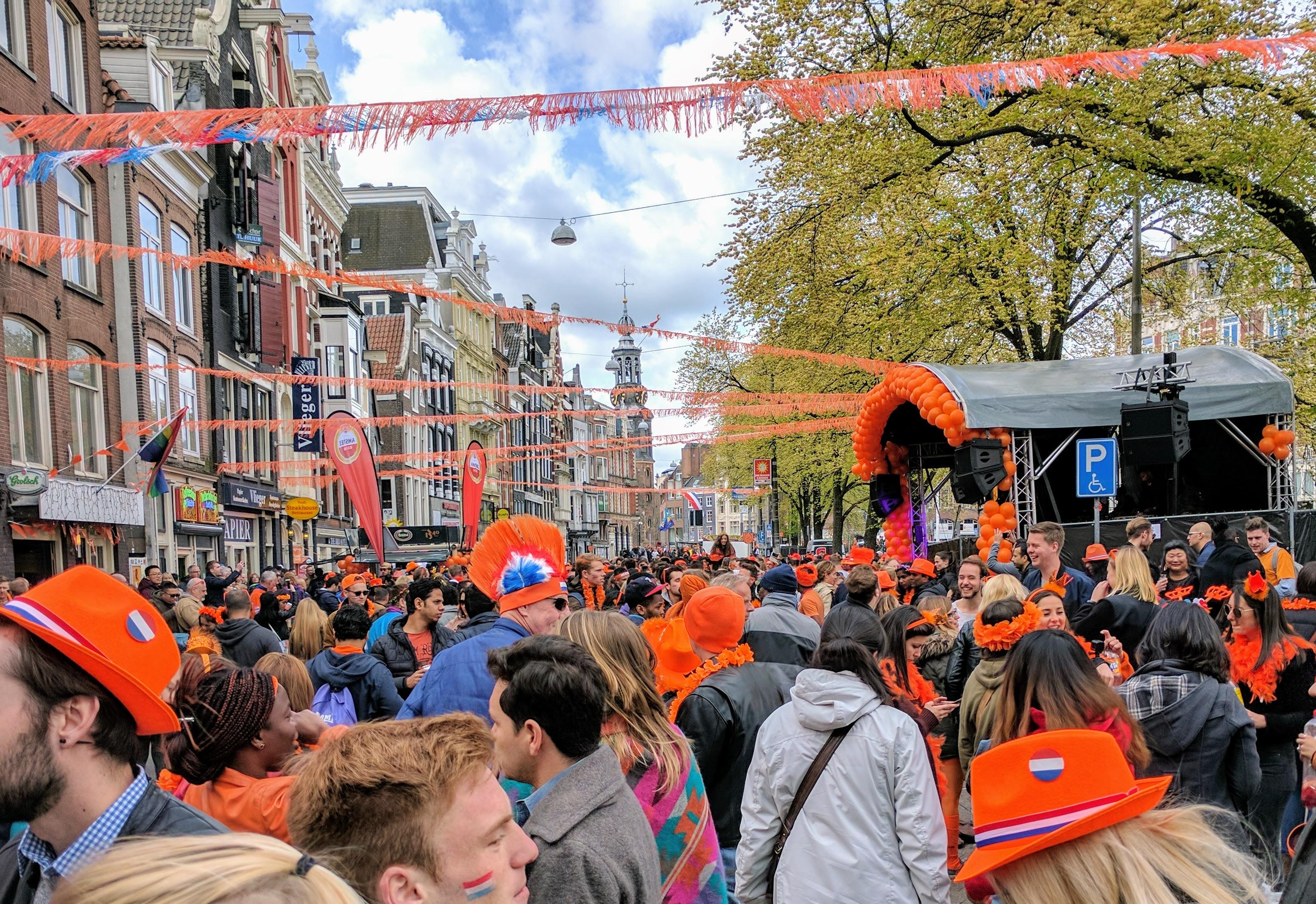
Dutch people in orange celebrating King's Day in Amsterdam, 2017

Dutch manners are open and direct with a no-nonsense attitude—informality combined with adherence to basic behaviour. "Dealing with the Dutch" by Jacob Vossestein states: "Dutch egalitarianism is the idea that people are equal, especially from a moral point of view, and accordingly, causes the somewhat ambiguous stance the Dutch have towards hierarchy and status."

The Netherlands is one of the most secular countries in Europe. Religion in the Netherlands is generally considered a personal matter which is not supposed to be propagated in public, although it often remains a discussion subject.

=== Art, architecture and philosophy ===
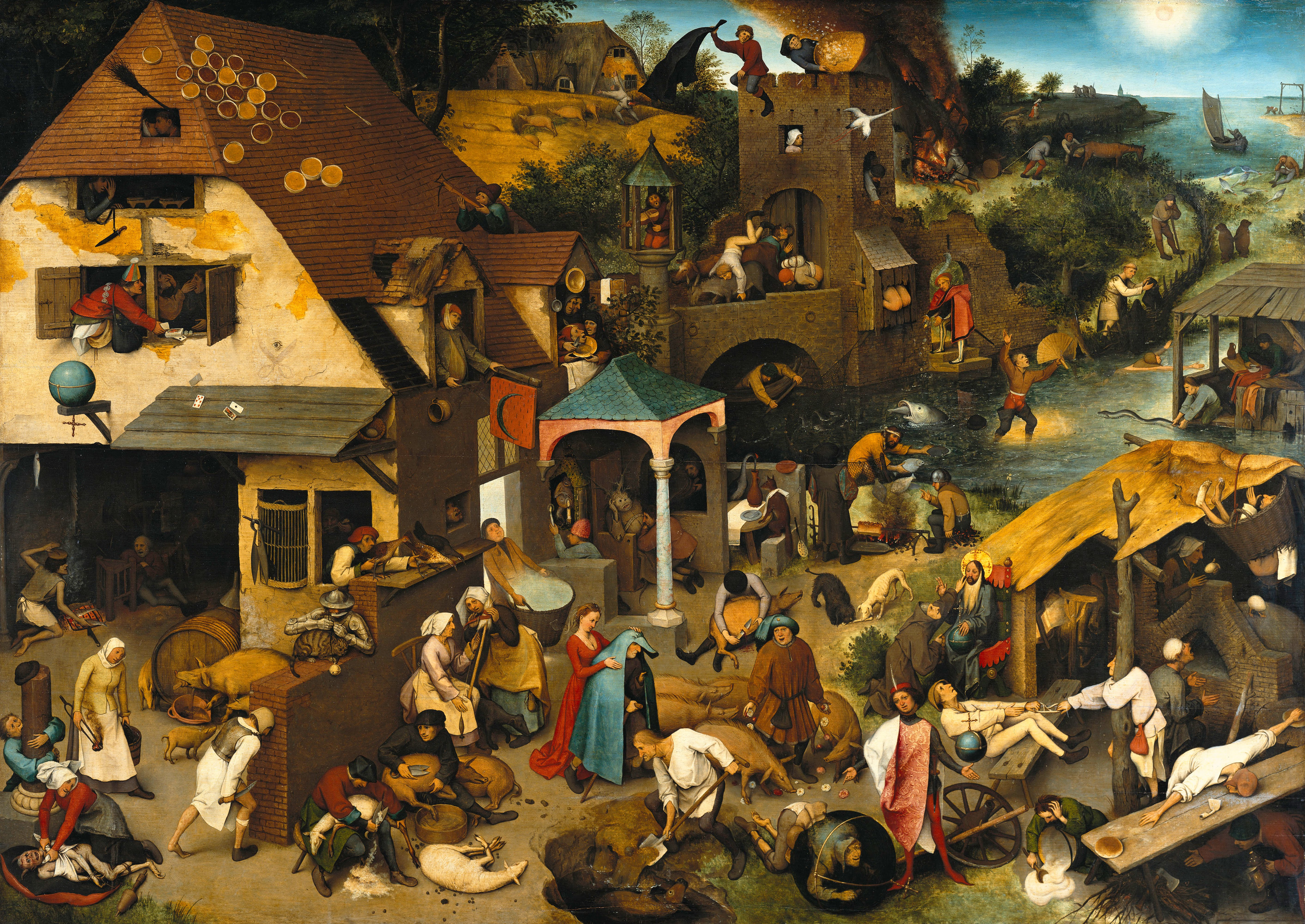
Netherlandish Proverbs by Brabantine artist Pieter Bruegel the Elder

Flower Beds in Holland by Brabantine artist Vincent van Gogh

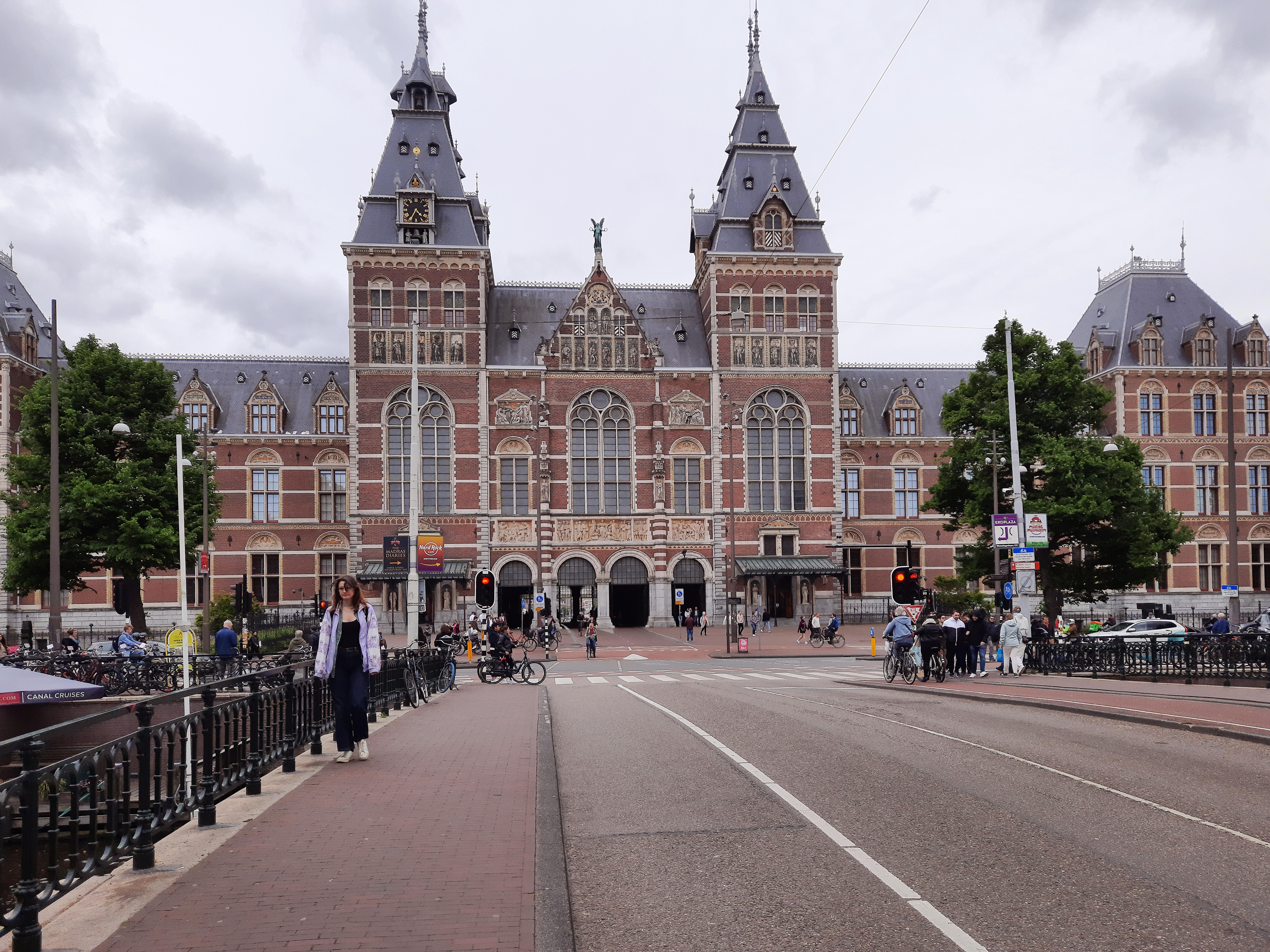
The Rijksmuseum in Amsterdam

The Netherlands has had many well-known painters. In the Middle Ages Hieronymus Bosch and Pieter Bruegel the Elder were leading pioneers. During the Dutch Golden Age, the Dutch Republic was prosperous and witnessed a flourishing artistic movement. The "Dutch Masters", spanning this 17th century era, included Rembrandt, Johannes Vermeer, Jan Steen, and Jacob van Ruisdael. Famous painters of the 19th and 20th century include Vincent van Gogh and Piet Mondrian.

Literature flourished during the Dutch Golden Age, Joost van den Vondel and P. C. Hooft being the most famous writers. In the 19th century, Multatuli wrote Max Havelaar, a book about the poor treatment of the natives in the Dutch East Indies. Diary of a Young Girl by Anne Frank is the most translated book from Dutch. Other important 20th century authors include Harry Mulisch, Jan Wolkers, Hella Haasse, Willem Frederik Hermans, Cees Nooteboom and Gerard Reve.

Various architectural styles can be distinguished in the Netherlands. The Romanesque architecture was built between 950 and 1250. Gothic architecture was used from about 1230. Gothic buildings had large windows, pointed arches and were richly decorated. Brabantine Gothic originated with the rise of the Duchy of Brabant and spread throughout the Burgundian provinces. Dutch Baroque architecture (1525–1630) and classicism (1630–1700) is especially evident in the west. Other architectural styles are Art Nouveau, Expressionism, De Stijl, Traditionalism and Brutalism.

Erasmus and Spinoza were famous Dutch philosophers. Scientist Christiaan Huygens discovered Saturn's moon Titan, argued that light travelled as waves, invented the pendulum clock, and was the first physicist to use mathematical formulae. Antonie van Leeuwenhoek was the first to observe and describe single-celled organisms with a microscope. Windmills, tulips, clogs, cheese, and cannabis have grown to symbolise the Netherlands, especially among tourists.

=== Music ===
The Netherlands has multiple music traditions. Traditional Dutch music is a genre known as "Levenslied", meaning Song of life. These songs typically have a simple melody and rhythm, and a straightforward structure of verses and choruses. Themes can be light, but are often sentimental and include love, death and loneliness. Traditional musical instruments such as the accordion and the barrel organ are a staple of levenslied music, though in recent years many artists use synthesisers and guitars.

Contemporary Dutch rock and pop music (Nederpop) originated in the 1960s, heavily influenced by popular music from the United States and Britain. Bands such as Shocking Blue, Golden Earring, Tee Set, Pussycat (band), George Baker Selection and Focus enjoyed international success. From the 1980s, more and more pop musicians started working in the Dutch language, partly inspired by the huge success of the band Doe Maar.

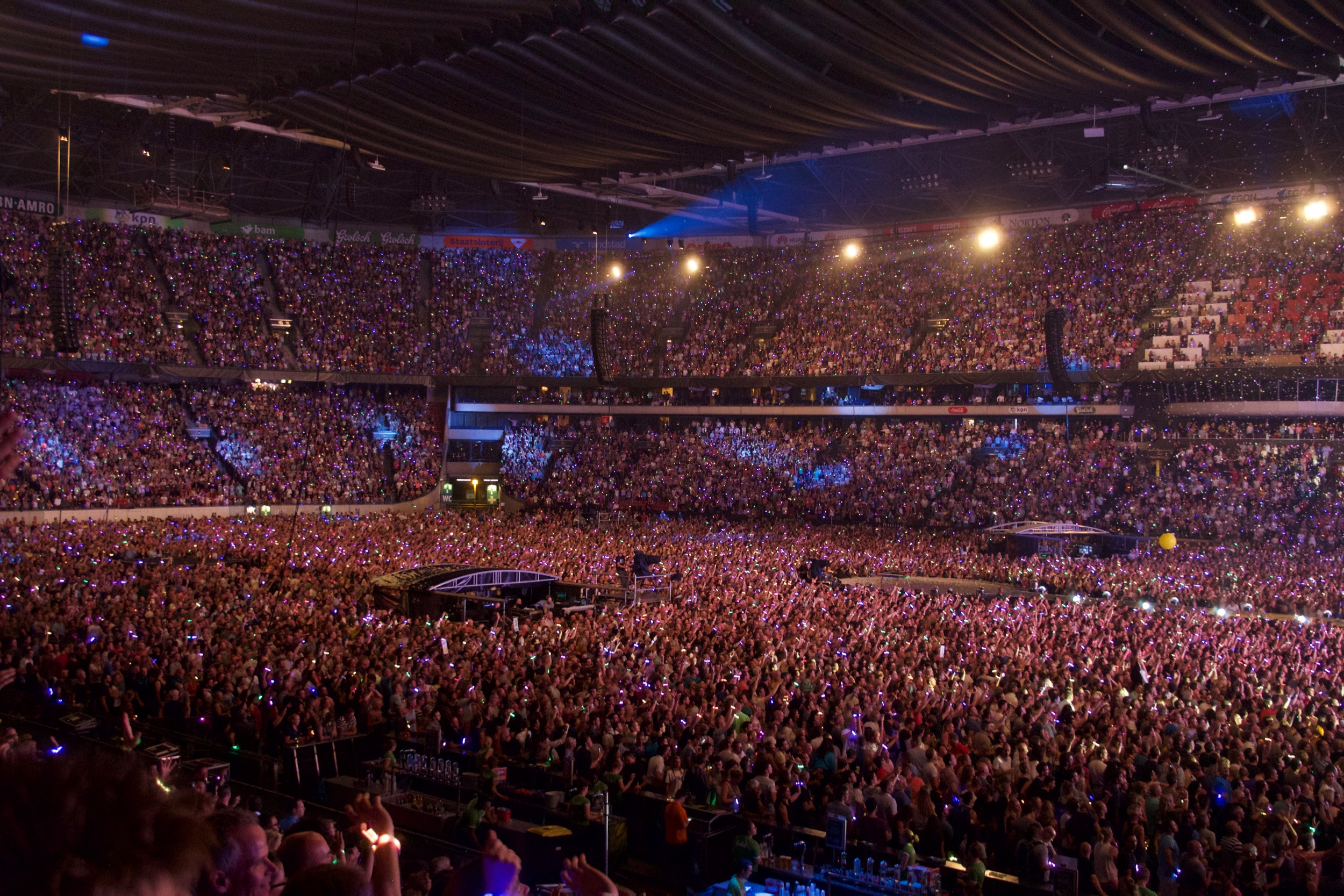
Johan Cruyff Arena, the largest Dutch concert venue

Current symphonic metal bands Epica, Delain, ReVamp, The Gathering, Asrai, Autumn, Ayreon and Within Temptation as well as jazz and pop singer Caro Emerald are having international success. Metal bands like Hail of Bullets, God Dethroned, Izegrim, Asphyx, Textures, Heidevolk, and Slechtvalk are popular guests at the biggest metal festivals in Europe. Contemporary local stars include pop singer Anouk, country pop singer Ilse DeLange, Limburgish dialect singing folk band Rowwen Hèze, rock band BLØF and duo Nick & Simon.

Early 1990s Dutch and Belgian house music came together in Eurodance project 2 Unlimited. Selling 18 million records, the two singers in the band are the most successful Dutch music artists to this day. Tracks like "Get Ready for This" are still popular themes of U.S. sports events. In the mid-1990s, Dutch-language rap and hip-hop (Nederhop) came to fruition and has become popular in the Netherlands and Belgium.

Since the 1990s, Dutch electronic dance music (EDM) gained widespread popularity in the world in many forms. Some of the world's best known dance music DJs hail from the Netherlands, including Armin van Buuren, Tiësto, Hardwell, Martin Garrix, Dash Berlin, Julian Jordan, Nicky Romero, W&W, Don Diablo, Ummet Ozcan, Headhunterz, Sander van Doorn, and Afrojack; the first four of which have been ranked as best in the world by DJ Mag Top 100 DJs. The Amsterdam Dance Event (ADE) is the world's leading electronic music conference and the biggest club festival for the many electronic subgenres on the planet. The Netherlands has participated in the Eurovision Song Contest since its first edition in 1956, and has won five times.

In classical music, Jan Sweelinck is a famous Dutch 16th to 17th-century composer; Louis Andriessen is among the best-known contemporary Dutch classical composers. Ton Koopman and Gustav Leonhardt are internationally recognised Dutch conductors, organists, and harpsichordists.

=== Film and television ===
Some films – mainly by director Paul Verhoeven – have received international distribution and recognition, such as Turkish Delight ("Turks Fruit", 1973), Soldier of Orange ("Soldaat van Oranje", 1977), Spetters (1980), and The Fourth Man ("De Vierde Man", 1983). Verhoeven then went on to direct big Hollywood movies like RoboCop (1987), Total Recall (1990), and Basic Instinct (1992), and returned with Dutch film Black Book ("Zwartboek", 2006).

Other well-known directors are Jan de Bont, Anton Corbijn, Dick Maas, Fons Rademakers, Alex van Warmerdam and documentary makers Bert Haanstra and Joris Ivens. Theo van Gogh achieved international notoriety in 2004 when he was murdered by Mohammed Bouyeri in Amsterdam after directing the short film Submission.

Directors of photography include Hoyte van Hoytema, Rogier Stoffers, Theo van de Sande and Robby Müller. Internationally successful actors include Famke Janssen, Carice van Houten, Rutger Hauer, Jeroen Krabbé., Sylvia Kristel, Michiel Huisman, Sylvia Hoeks, Marwan Kenzari and Carel Struycken.

The Netherlands has a well developed television market, with commercial and public broadcasters. Imported TV programmes, as well as interviews with responses in a foreign language, are virtually always shown with the original sound and subtitled. Only foreign shows for children are dubbed.

TV exports from the Netherlands mostly take the form of specific formats and franchises, most notably was the internationally active TV production conglomerate Endemol, founded by Dutch media tycoons John de Mol and Joop van den Ende. Endemol and its subsidiaries created and ran reality, talent, and game show franchises worldwide, including Big Brother and Deal or No Deal. Endemol merged with Shine Group in 2015, and was bought by Banijay in 2020.

=== Cuisine ===
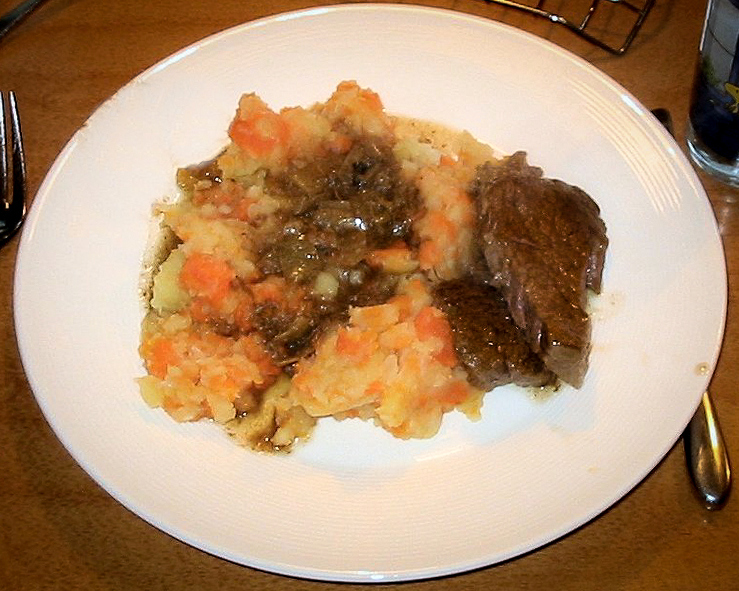
Hutspot with beef stew on plate

Dutch cuisine is simple and straightforward and contains many dairy products. Breakfast and lunch are typically bread with toppings; cereal is an option. Traditionally dinner consists of potatoes, meat, and vegetables. The diet was high in carbohydrates and fat, reflecting the dietary needs of the labourers whose culture moulded the country. During the 20th century, this diet changed and became more cosmopolitan, most global cuisines being represented in the major cities. In early 2014, Oxfam ranked the Netherlands as the country with the most nutritious, plentiful and healthy food. Modern culinary writers distinguish between three regional forms of Dutch cuisine: northeast, west and south.

In the northeast, the late 18th century introduction of large scale agriculture means the cuisine is known for its meats. The relative lack of farms allowed for an abundance of game and husbandry, though dishes near the coast include a large amount of fish. Typical sausages include metworst, rookworst, often eaten alongside stamppot, hutspot, or zuurkool (sauerkraut). Breads include hard textured rye bread, pastries and cookies. As a coastal region, Friesland is home to low-lying grasslands and thus has a cheese production in common with the Western cuisine. Cookies are produced in great number and contain a lot of butter and sugar. The traditional alcoholic beverages are beer (strong pale lager) and Jenever (a high proof juniper-flavoured spirit that came to be known in England as gin). Advocaat, a rich and creamy liqueur made from eggs, sugar and brandy, is native to this region.

In the west, the abundance of water and flat grasslands mean the area is known for its dairy products, which include prominent cheeses such as Gouda, Leyden (spiced cheese with cumin), and Edam (traditionally in small spheres) as well as Leerdammer and Beemster, while the adjacent Zaanstreek in North Holland has been known since the 16th century for its mayonnaise and whole-grain mustards. A by-product of the butter-making process, karnemelk (buttermilk) is considered typical for this region. Seafood such as soused herring, mussels, eels, oysters and shrimps are widely available and typical for the region.

Southern Dutch cuisine is known for rich pastries, soups, stews and vegetable dishes. It is the only Dutch culinary region that developed an haute cuisine. Pastries are abundant, often with rich fillings of cream, custard or fruits. Cakes such as vlaai, moorkop and bossche bol are typical pastries. Savoury pastries abound, the worstenbroodje (a roll with a sausage of ground beef, literally translates into sausage bread) being the most popular. The alcoholic beverage of the region is beer, there are many local brands, ranging from Trappist to Kriek.

==== Cheese ====
The Netherlands is well known for its cheese production, with internationally recognised varieties, such as Gouda, Edam, and Leyden. Traditional cheese markets are still held in towns like Alkmaar, Gouda, and Edam.

=== Sport ===
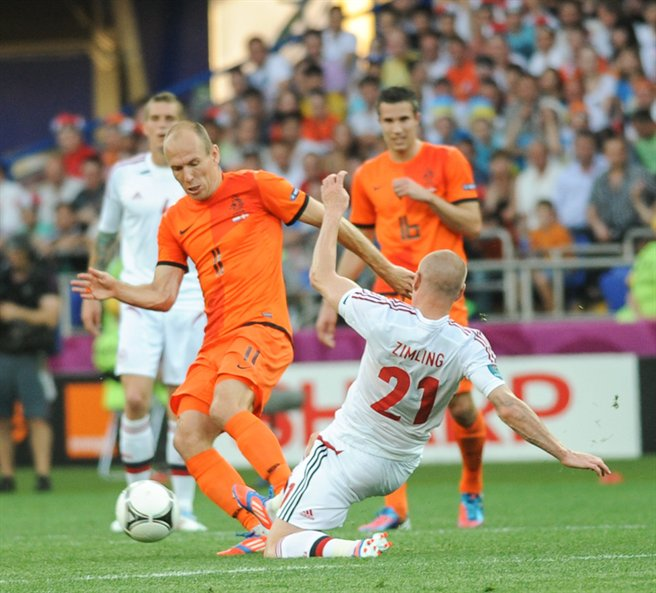
Dutch star football players Arjen Robben and Robin van Persie during a game with the Netherlands against Denmark at Euro 2012

Approximately 4.5 million people are registered in one of the 35,000 sports clubs in the country. About two-thirds of the population between 15 and 75 participate in sport on a weekly basis. Football is the most popular team sport, followed by field hockey and volleyball. Tennis, gymnastics and golf are the three most widely engaged in individual sports. Organisation of sports began at the end of the 19th century and beginning of the 20th century. Federations for various sports were established, rules were unified and sports clubs came into existence. A Dutch National Olympic Committee was established in 1912.

The national football team was runner-up in the World Cup of 1974, 1978, and 2010, and won the European Championship of 1988. Of SI's 50 greatest footballers of all time, Johan Cruyff (#5), Marco van Basten (#19), Ruud Gullit (#25), and Johan Neeskens (#36) are Dutch. The women's national team was runner-up in 2019 World Cup and won the European Championship of 2017. The Netherlands women's field hockey team won 9 out of 15 World Cups. The Netherlands baseball team have won the European championship 24 times out of 33 events. The volleyball national women's team won the European Championship in 1995 and the World Grand Prix in 2007.

The Netherlands has won 266 medals at the Summer Olympic Games and 110 at the Winter Olympic Games. Joop Zoetemelk won the 1979 Vuelta a Espana, the 1980 Tour de France, and the 1985 UCI World Championship. Jan Janssen won the 1968 Tour de France, Tom Dumoulin the 2017 Giro d'Italia. Max Verstappen, the youngest Formula 1 driver to make his debut and to win a race, was the first Dutchman to win a Grand Prix and a Formula One World Drivers Championship. Dutch K-1 kickboxers have won the K-1 World Grand Prix 15 times out of 19 tournaments.

== See also ==
- Outline of the Netherlands
