= Prehistory of the Netherlands =

The prehistory of the Netherlands was heavily influenced by the region's constantly changing, low-lying geography. Inhabited by humans for at least 37,000 years, the landscape underwent significant transformations, from the last ice age's tundra climate to the emergence of various Paleolithic groups. The region witnessed the development of the Swifterbant culture, which was closely linked to rivers and open water, while the Mesolithic era saw the creation of the world's oldest recovered canoe, the Pesse canoe. The arrival of agriculture around 5000–4000 BC marked the beginning of the Linear Pottery culture, which gradually transformed prehistoric communities.

A succession of cultural groups, such as the Funnelbeaker, Corded Ware, and Bell Beaker cultures, left their mark on the area. The Bronze Age heralded increased prosperity and trade, with the construction of notable monuments such as the dolmens in Drenthe. The Iron Age, on the other hand, brought about the spread of Germanic and Celtic influences in the region, exemplified by the Elp and Hilversum cultures. The pre-Roman period was characterized by a complex interplay of different cultures and ethnicities, including the emergence of early Frisians, Saxons and Salian Franks.

== Historical changes to the landscape ==
The prehistory of the area that is now the Netherlands was largely shaped by its constantly shifting, low-lying geography.

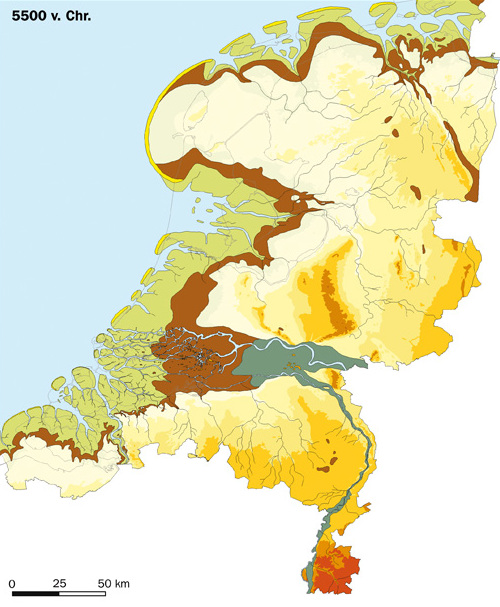
The Netherlands in 5500 BC

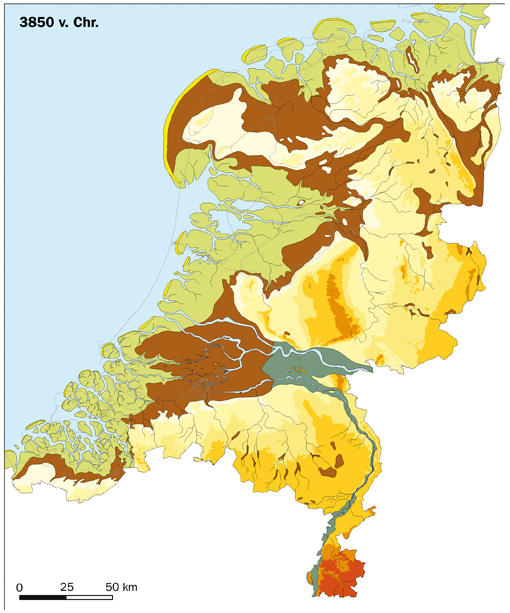
The Netherlands in 3850 BC

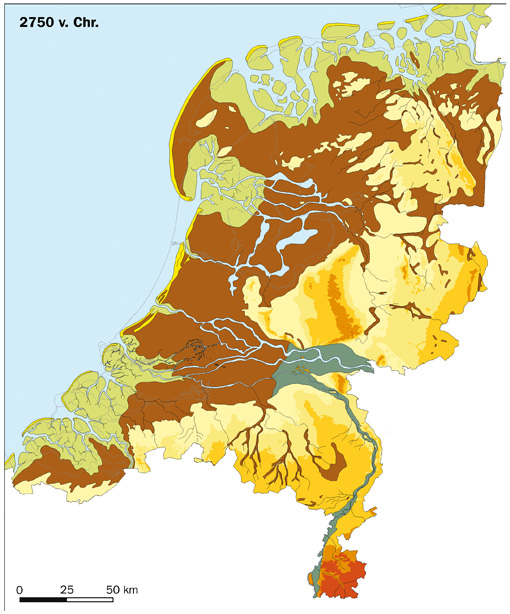
The Netherlands in 2750 BC

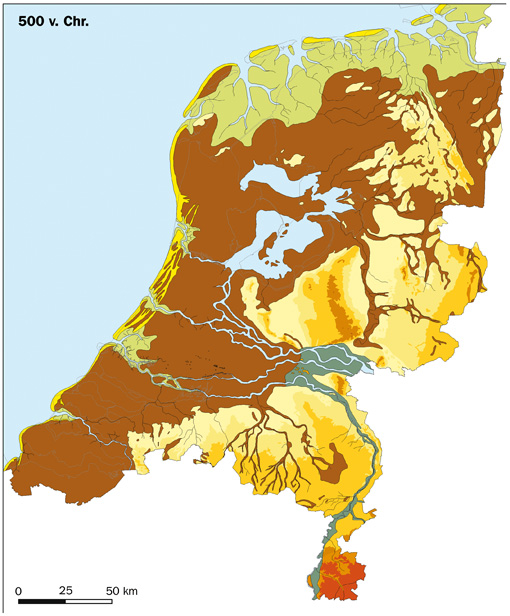
The Netherlands in 500 BC

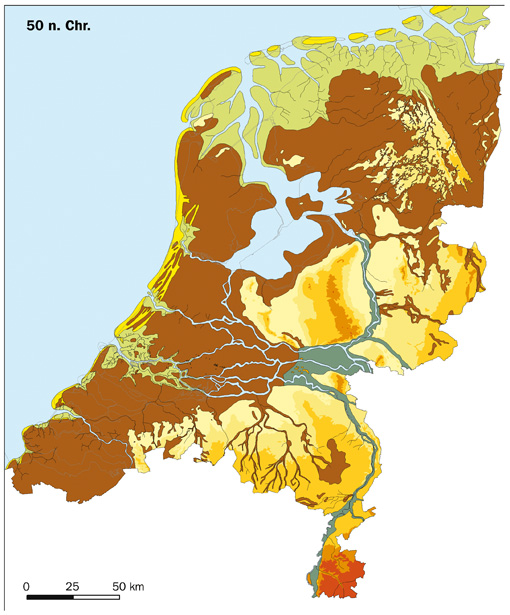
The Netherlands in AD 50
tidal sand flats, tidal mudflats, salt marshes
peat marshes and floodplain silt areas
(including old river courses and riverbank breaches which have filled up with silt or peat)
Valleys of the major rivers (not covered with peat)
River dunes (Pleistocene dunes)
open water (sea, lagoons, rivers)
Pleistocene landscape (> −6 m compared to NAP)
Pleistocene landscape (−6 to 0 m; –20 to 0 ft)
Pleistocene landscape (0–10 m; 0–33 ft)
Pleistocene landscape (10–20 m; 33–66 ft)
Pleistocene landscape (20–50 m; 66–164 ft)
Pleistocene landscape (50–100 m; 164–328 ft)
Pleistocene landscape (100–200 m; 328–656 ft)

== Earliest groups of hunter-gatherers (before 5000 BC) ==
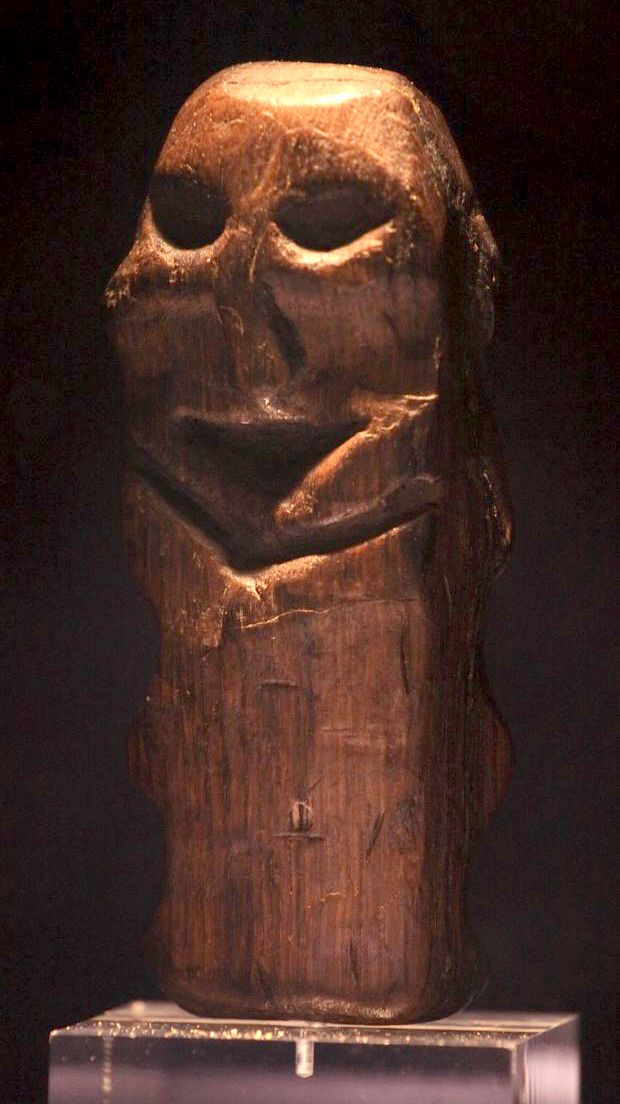
An oak figurine found in Willemstad, c. 4500 BC. Height: 12.5 cm (4.9 in).

The oldest human (Neanderthal) traces, believed to be about 70,000 years old, were found in higher soils near Maastricht.

The area that is now the Netherlands was inhabited by early humans at least 37,000 years ago, as attested by flint tools discovered in Woerden in 2010. In 2009 a fragment of a 40,000-year-old Neanderthal skull was found in sand dredged from the North Sea floor off the coast of Zeeland.

During the last ice age, the Netherlands had a tundra climate with scarce vegetation and the inhabitants survived as hunter-gatherers. After the end of the ice age, various Paleolithic groups inhabited the area. It is known that around 8000 BC a Mesolithic tribe resided near Burgumer Mar (Friesland). Another group residing elsewhere is known to have made canoes. The oldest recovered canoe in the world is the Pesse canoe. According to C14 dating analysis it was constructed somewhere between 8200 BC and 7600 BC. This canoe is exhibited in the Drents Museum in Assen.

At the end of the Ice Age, the nomadic late Upper Palaeolithic Hamburg culture (13,000–10,000 BC) hunted reindeer in the area, using spears. The later Ahrensburg culture (11,200–9,500 BC) used bow and arrow. From Mesolithic Maglemosian-like tribes (c. 8000 BC), the world's oldest canoe was found in Drenthe.

Autochthonous hunter-gatherers from the Swifterbant culture are attested from around 5600 BC onwards. They are strongly linked to rivers and open water and were related to the southern Scandinavian Ertebølle culture (5300–4000 BC). To the west, the same tribes might have built hunting camps to hunt winter game, including seals.

== The arrival of farming (around 5000–4000 BC) ==
There are a number of theories about the arrival of agriculture in the Netherlands. The first is that between 4800 and 4500 BC, the Swifterbant people started to adopt from the neighbouring Linear Pottery culture the practice of animal husbandry, and between 4300 and 4000 BC the practice of agriculture. The Funnelbeaker culture (4300–2800 BC), related to the Swifterbant culture, erected the dolmens, large stone grave monuments found in Drenthe. There was a quick and smooth transition from the Funnelbeaker farming culture to the pan-European Corded Ware pastoralist culture (c. 2950 BC). In the southwest, the Seine-Oise-Marne culture — related to the Vlaardingen culture (c. 2600 BC), an apparently more primitive culture of hunter-gatherers — survived well into the Neolithic period, until it too was succeeded by the Corded Ware culture.

The second is that agriculture arrived in the Netherlands somewhere around 5000 BC with the Linear Pottery culture, who were probably central European farmers. Agriculture was practiced only on the loess plateau in the very south (southern Limburg), but even there it was not established permanently. Farms did not develop in the rest of the Netherlands.

There is also a third theory that there is some evidence of small settlements in the rest of the country. These people made the switch to animal husbandry sometime between 4800 BC and 4500 BC. Dutch archaeologist Leendert Louwe Kooijmans wrote, "It is becoming increasingly clear that the agricultural transformation of prehistoric communities was a purely indigenous process that took place very gradually." This transformation took place as early as 4300 BC–4000 BC and featured the introduction of grains in small quantities into a traditional broad-spectrum economy.

== Funnelbeaker and other cultures (around 4000–3000 BC) ==
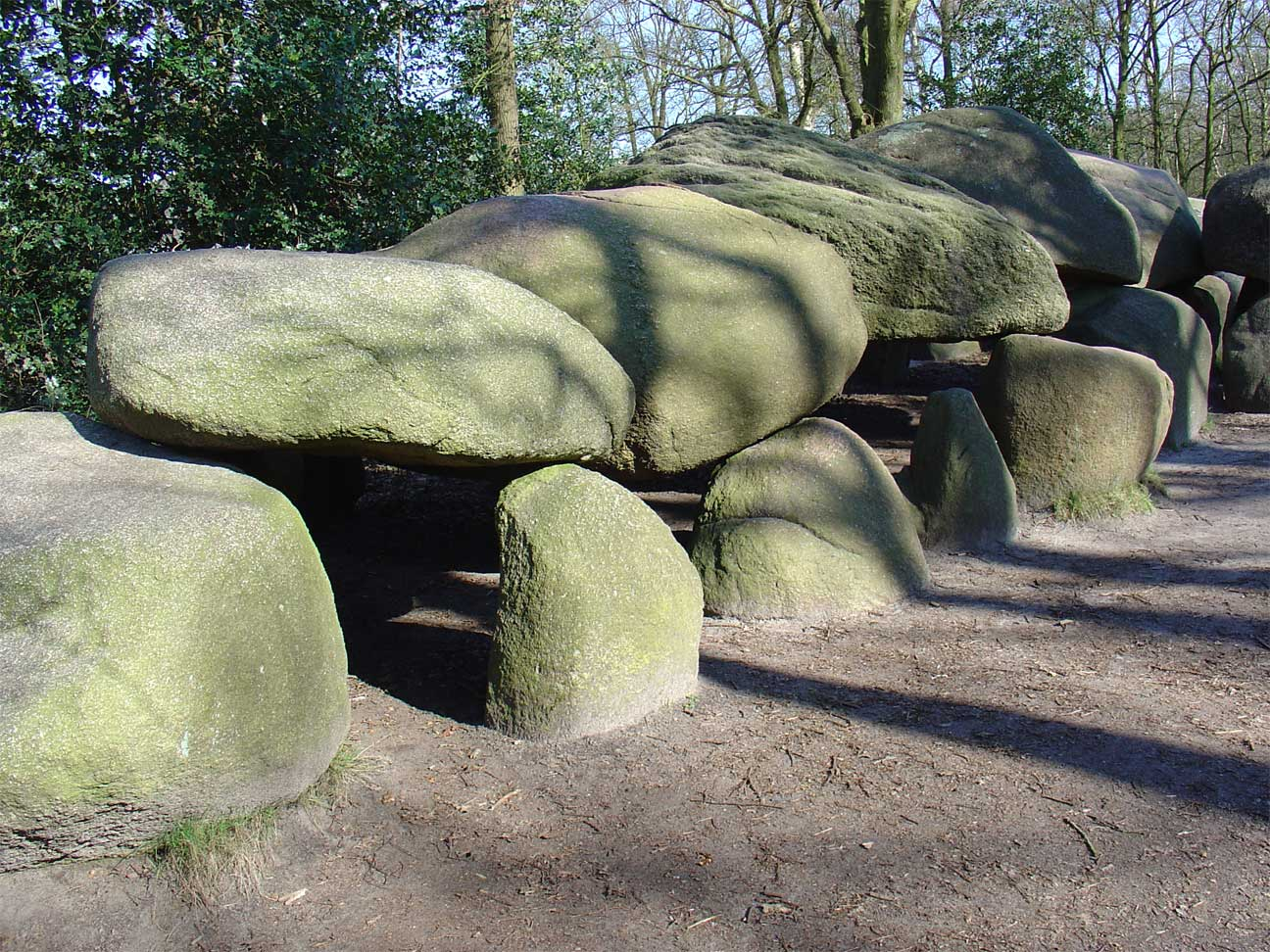
Hunebed D27, the largest dolmen in the Netherlands, located near Borger in Drenthe.

The Funnelbeaker culture was a farming culture extending from Denmark through northern Germany into the northern Netherlands. In this period of Dutch prehistory, the first notable remains were erected: the dolmens, large stone grave monuments. They are found in Drenthe, and were probably built between 4100 BC and 3200 BC.

To the west, the Vlaardingen culture (around 2600 BC), an apparently more primitive culture of hunter-gatherers survived well into the Neolithic period.

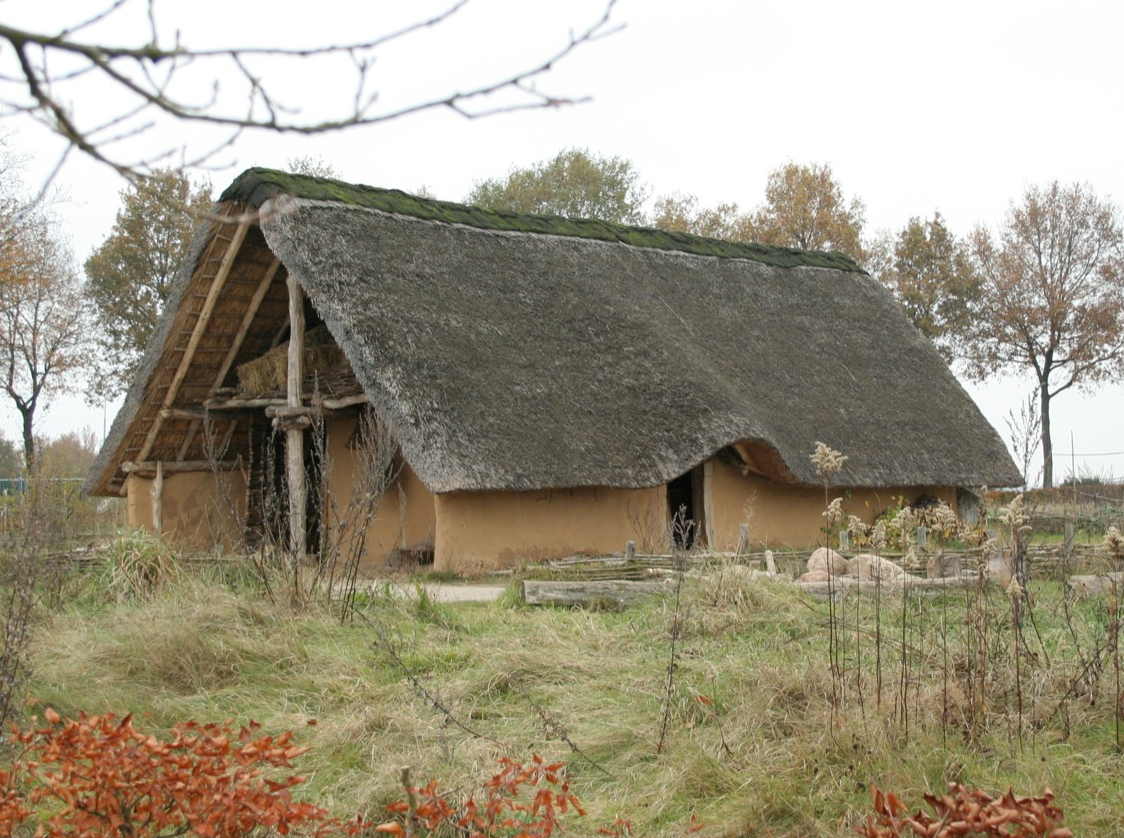
Reconstruction of a Funnelbeaker culture house

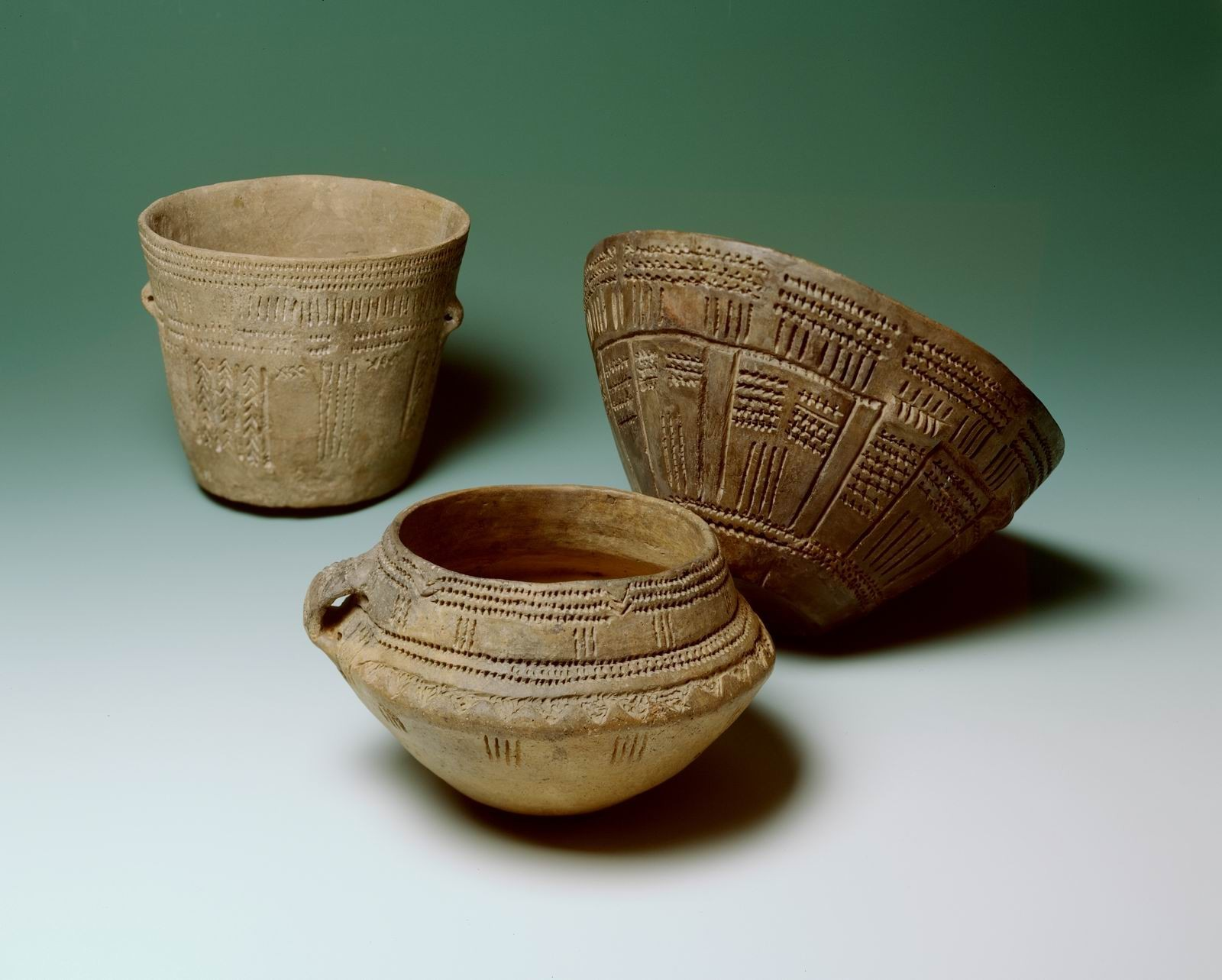
Funnelbeaker pottery

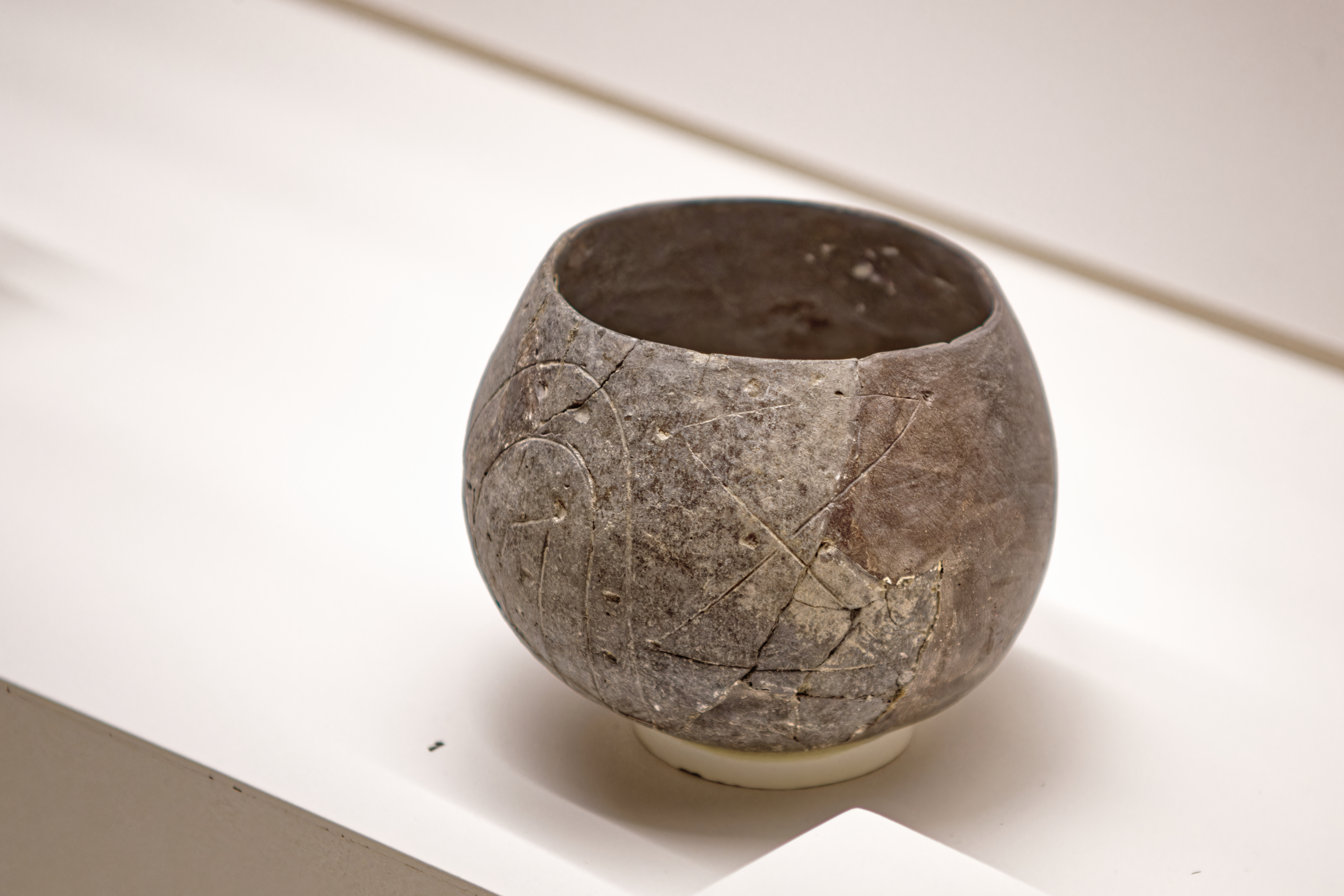
Linear Pottery culture pottery, c. 5000 BC

== Corded Ware and Bell Beaker cultures (around 3000–2000 BC) ==
Around 2950 BCE there was a transition from the Funnelbeaker farming culture to the Corded Ware pastoralist culture, a large archeological horizon appearing in western and central Europe, that is associated with the advance of Indo-European languages. This transition was probably caused by developments in eastern Germany, and it occurred within two generations.

The Bell Beaker culture was also present in the Netherlands. from around 2700 to 2100 BC. It introduced metalwork in copper, gold and later bronze and opened international trade routes not seen before, reflected in copper artifacts. Finds of rare bronze objects suggest that Drenthe was a trading centre in the Bronze Age (2000–800 BC). The Bell Beaker culture developed locally into the Barbed-Wire Beaker culture (2100–1800 BC) and later the Elp culture (1800–800 BC), a Middle Bronze Age archaeological culture with earthenware low-quality pottery as a marker. The initial phase of the Elp culture was characterised by tumuli (1800–1200 BC). The subsequent phase was that of cremating the dead and placing their ashes in urns which were then buried in fields, following the customs of the Urnfield culture (1200–800 BC). The southern region became dominated by the related Hilversum culture (1800–800 BC), with apparently cultural ties with Britain of the previous Barbed-Wire Beaker culture.

The Corded Ware and Bell Beaker cultures were not indigenous to the Netherlands but were pan-European in nature, extending across much of northern and central Europe.

The first evidence of the use of the wheel dates from this period, about 2400 BC. This culture also experimented with working with copper. Evidence of this, including stone anvils, copper knives, and a copper spearhead, was found on the Veluwe. Copper finds show that there was trade with other areas in Europe, as natural copper is not found in Dutch soil.

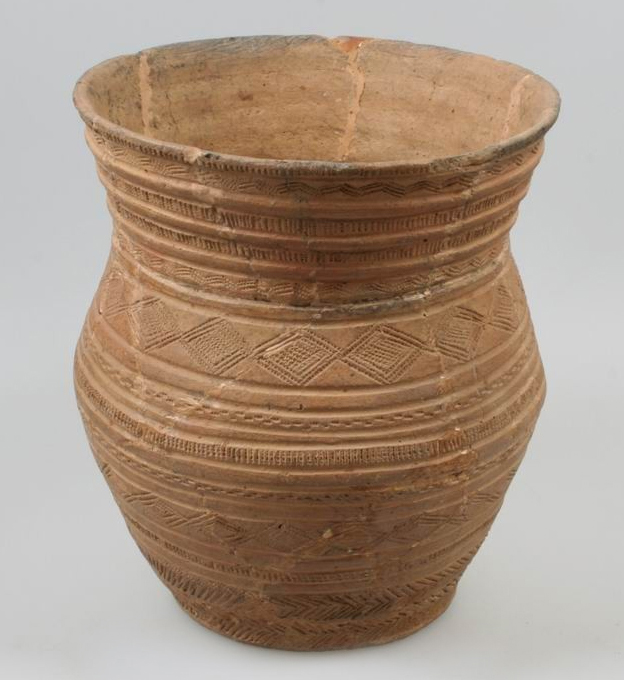
Bell Beaker ceramic vessel

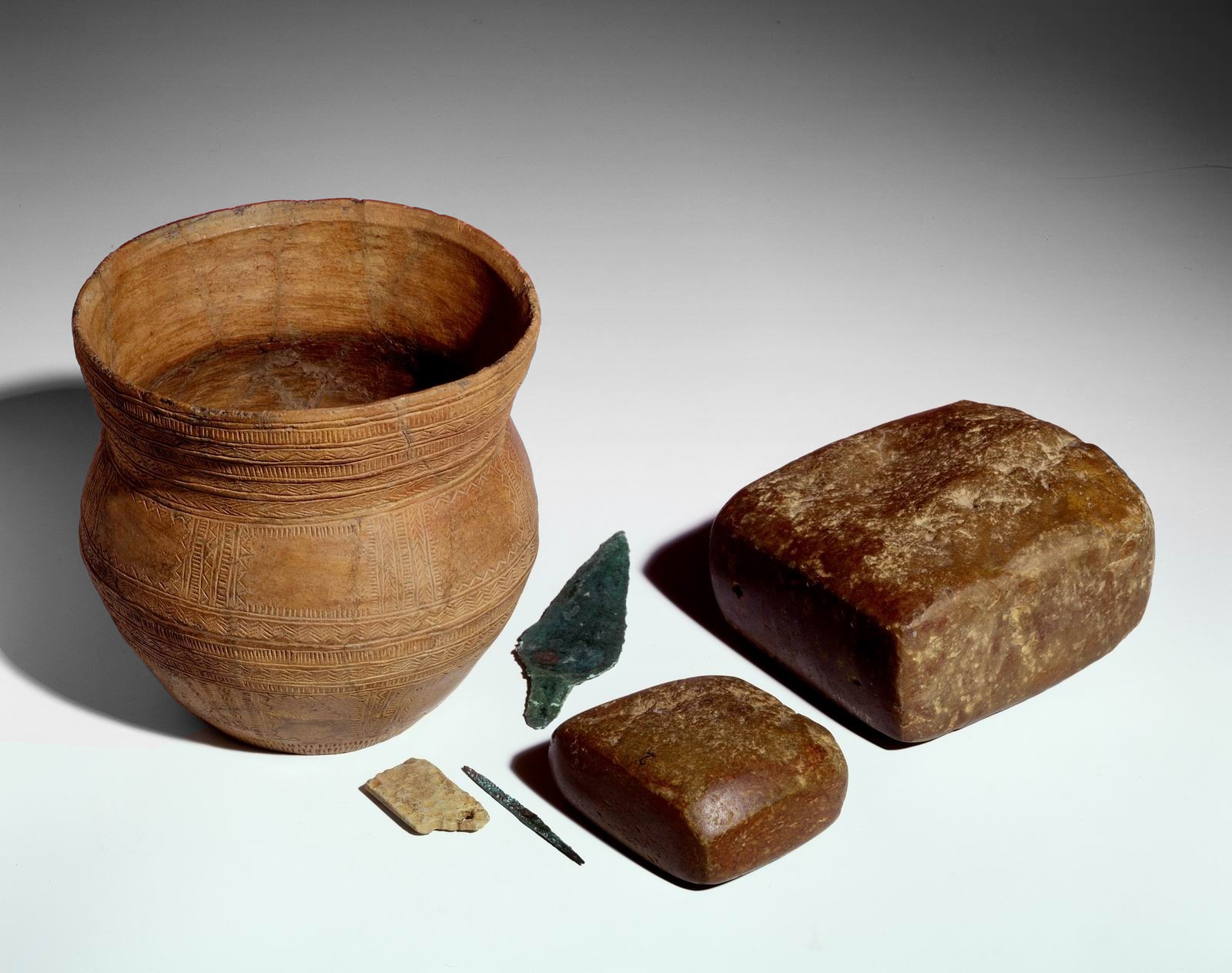
Beaker, copper dagger and metalworking tools

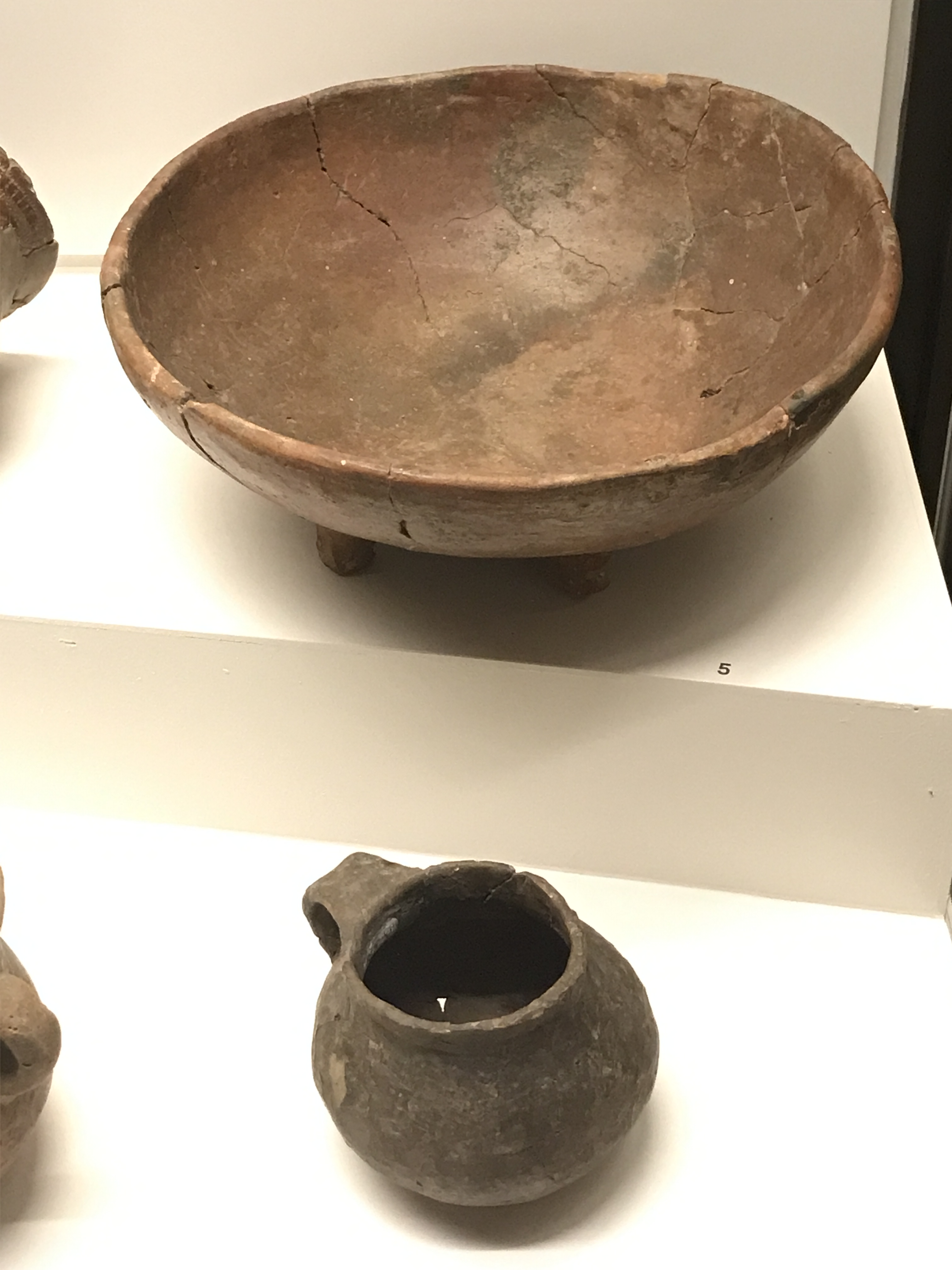
Footed bowl and jug

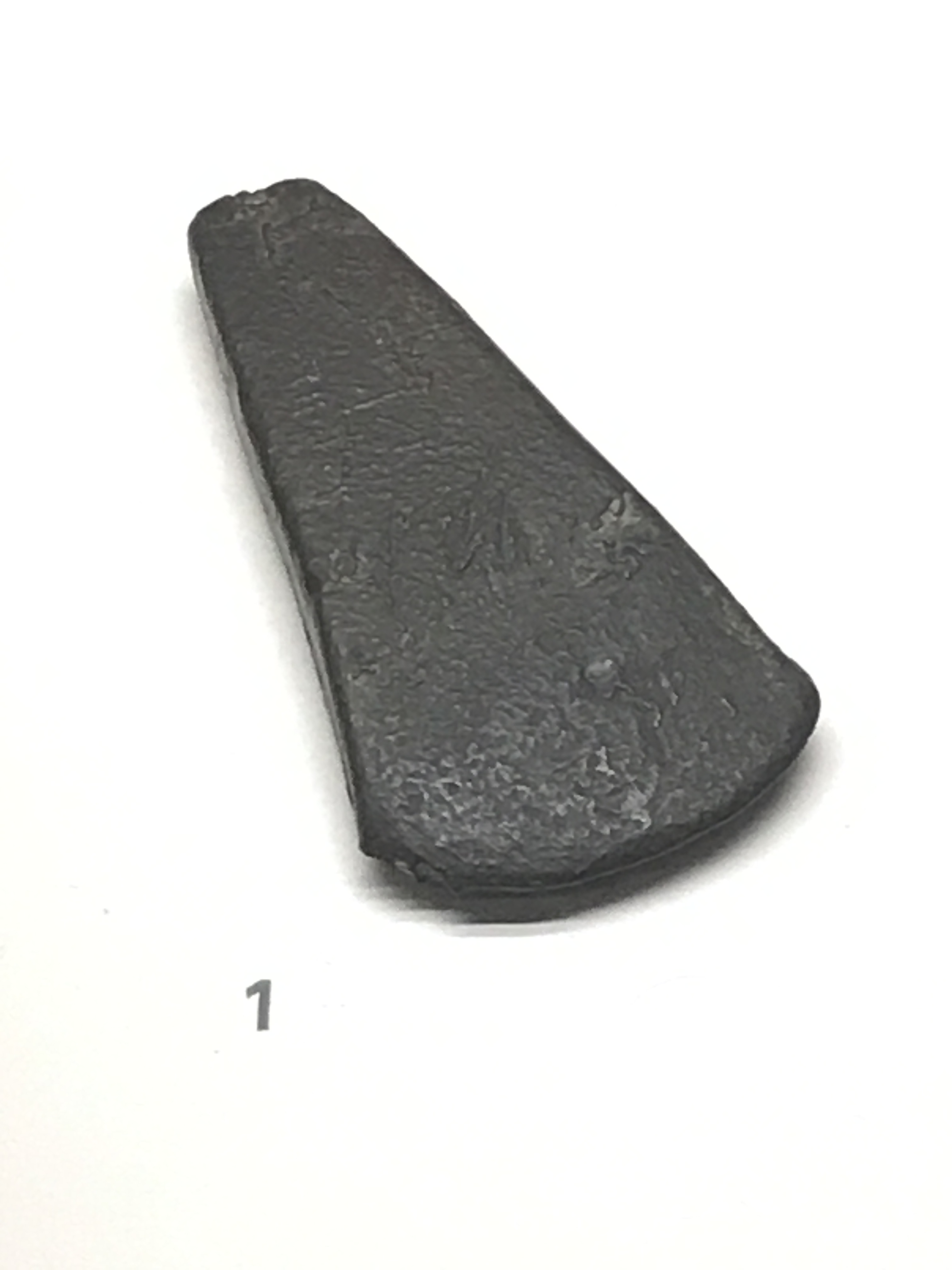
Copper axe, Bell Beaker culture

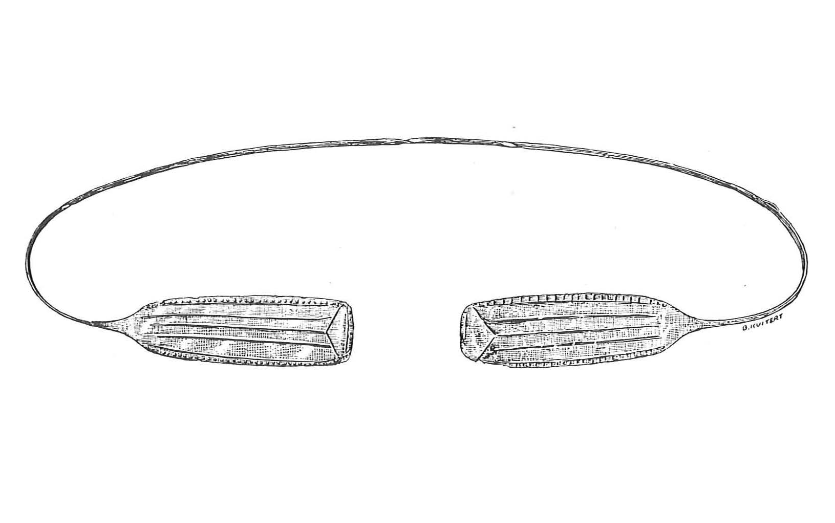
Gold ornament from Bennekom

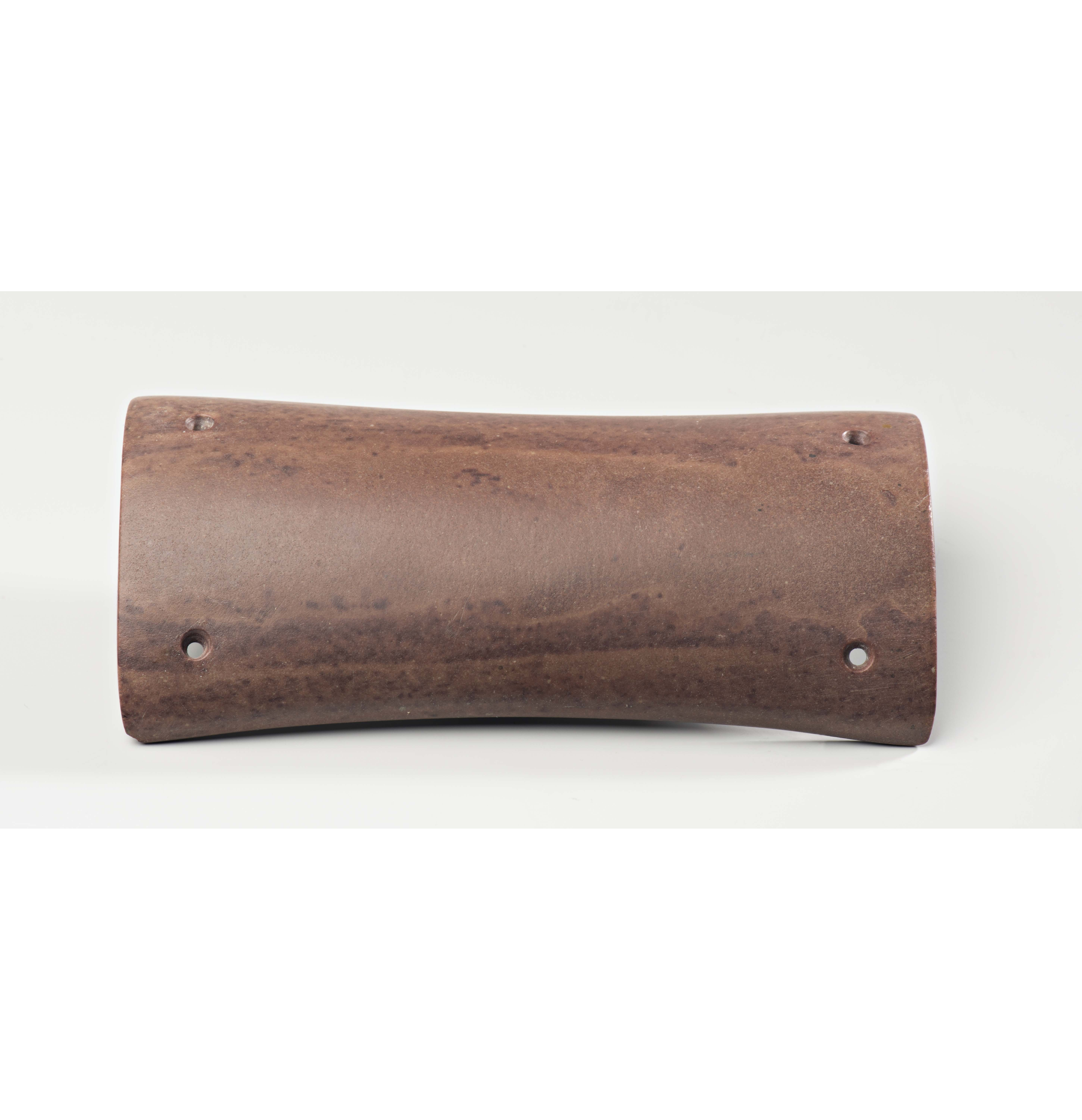
Stone wristguard

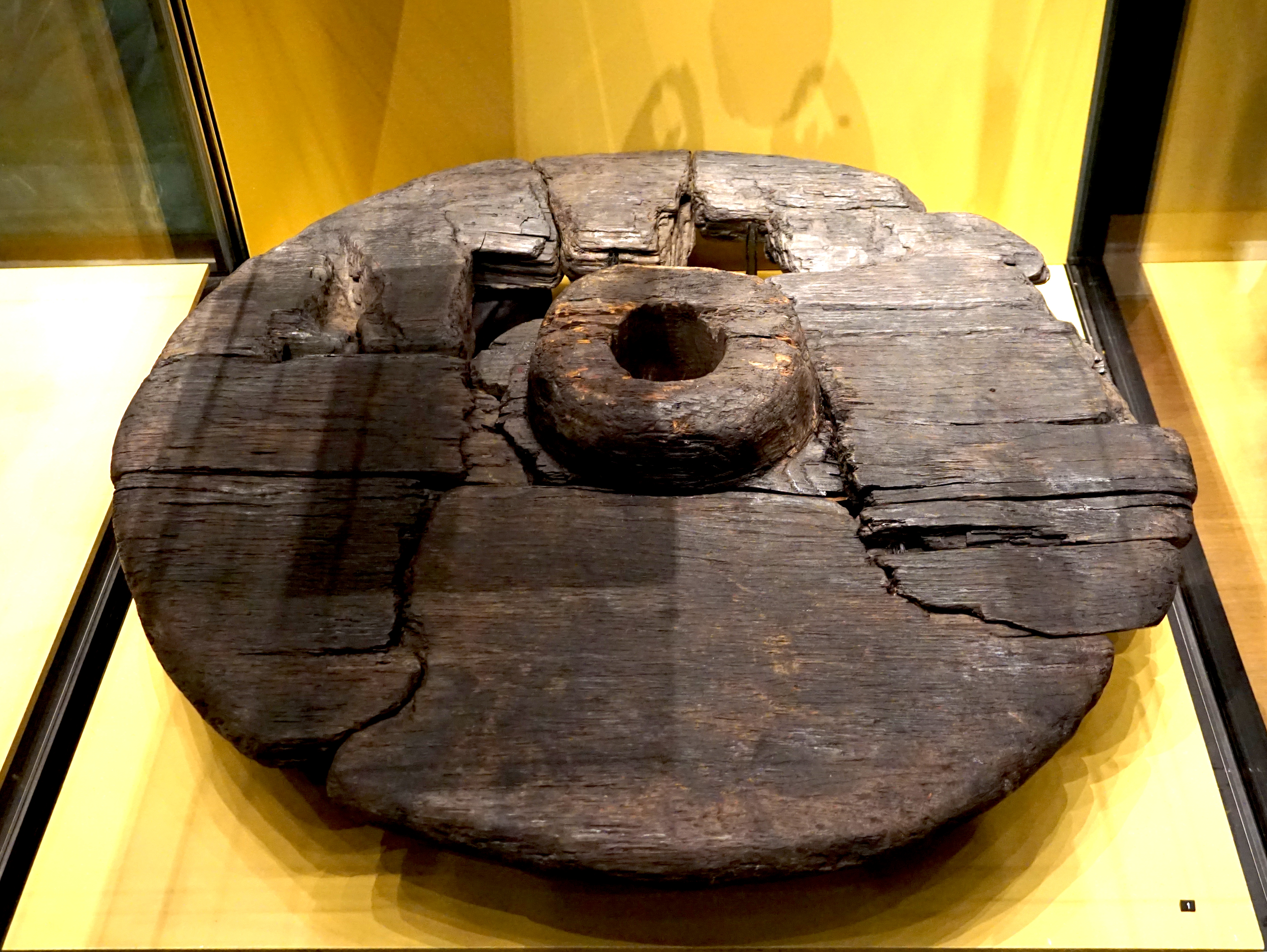
Wagon wheel from Ubbena, c. 2900-2580 BC, Single Grave culture

== Bronze Age (around 2000–800 BC) ==
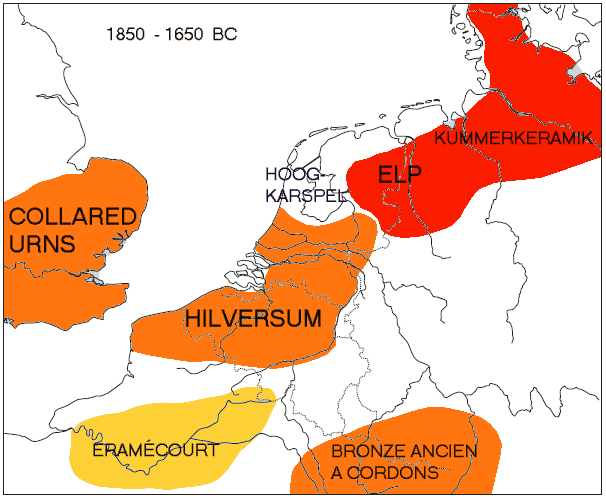
Location of the Elp and Hilversum cultures in the Bronze Age.

The Bronze Age probably started somewhere around 2000 BC and lasted until around 800 BC. The earliest bronze tools were in the Wageningen hoard, found in the grave of a Bronze Age metalworker. More Bronze Age objects from later periods have been found in Epe, Drouwen and elsewhere. Broken bronze objects found in Voorschoten were apparently destined for recycling. This indicates how valuable bronze was considered in the Bronze Age. Typical bronze objects from this period included knives, swords, axes, fibulae and bracelets.

Most of the Bronze Age objects found in the Netherlands have been found in Drenthe. One item shows that trading networks during this period extended a far distance. Large bronze situlae (buckets) found in Drenthe were manufactured somewhere in eastern France or in Switzerland. They were used for mixing wine with water (a Roman/Greek custom). The many finds in Drenthe of rare and valuable objects, such as tin-bead necklaces, suggest that Drenthe was a trading centre in the Netherlands in the Bronze Age.

The Bell Beaker cultures (2700–2100) locally developed into the Bronze Age Barbed-Wire Beaker culture (2100–1800). In the second millennium BC, the region was the boundary between the Atlantic and Nordic horizons and was split into a northern and a southern region, roughly divided by the course of the Rhine.

In the north, the Elp culture (c. 1800 to 800 BC) was a Bronze Age archaeological culture having earthenware pottery of low quality known as "Kümmerkeramik" (or "Grobkeramik") as a marker. The initial phase was characterized by tumuli (1800–1200 BC) that were strongly tied to contemporary tumuli in northern Germany and Scandinavia, and were apparently related to the Tumulus culture (1600–1200 BC) in central Europe. This phase was followed by a subsequent change featuring Urnfield (cremation) burial customs (1200–800 BC). The southern region became dominated by the Hilversum culture (1800–800), which apparently inherited the cultural ties with Britain of the previous Barbed-Wire Beaker culture.

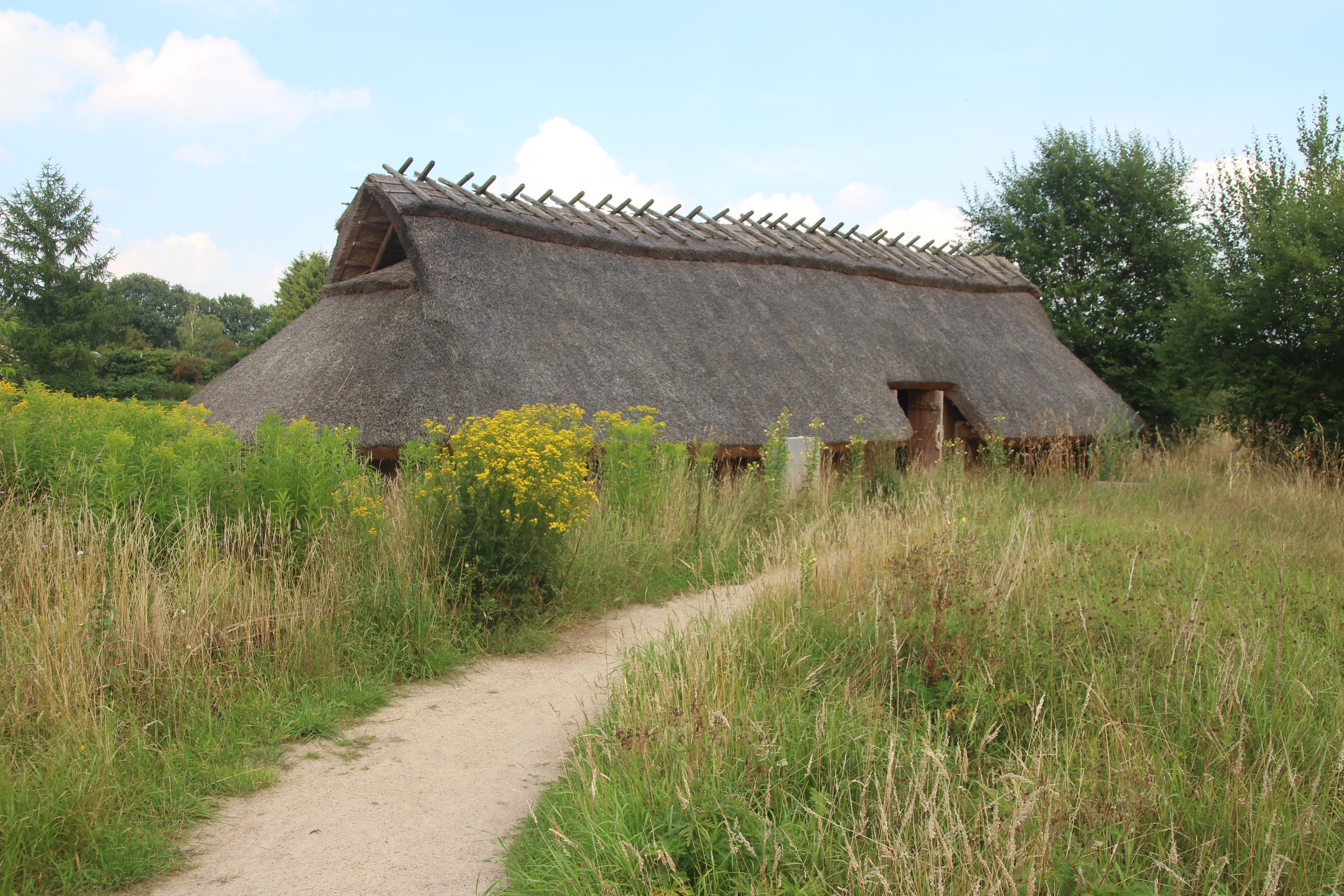
Bronze Age house reconstruction

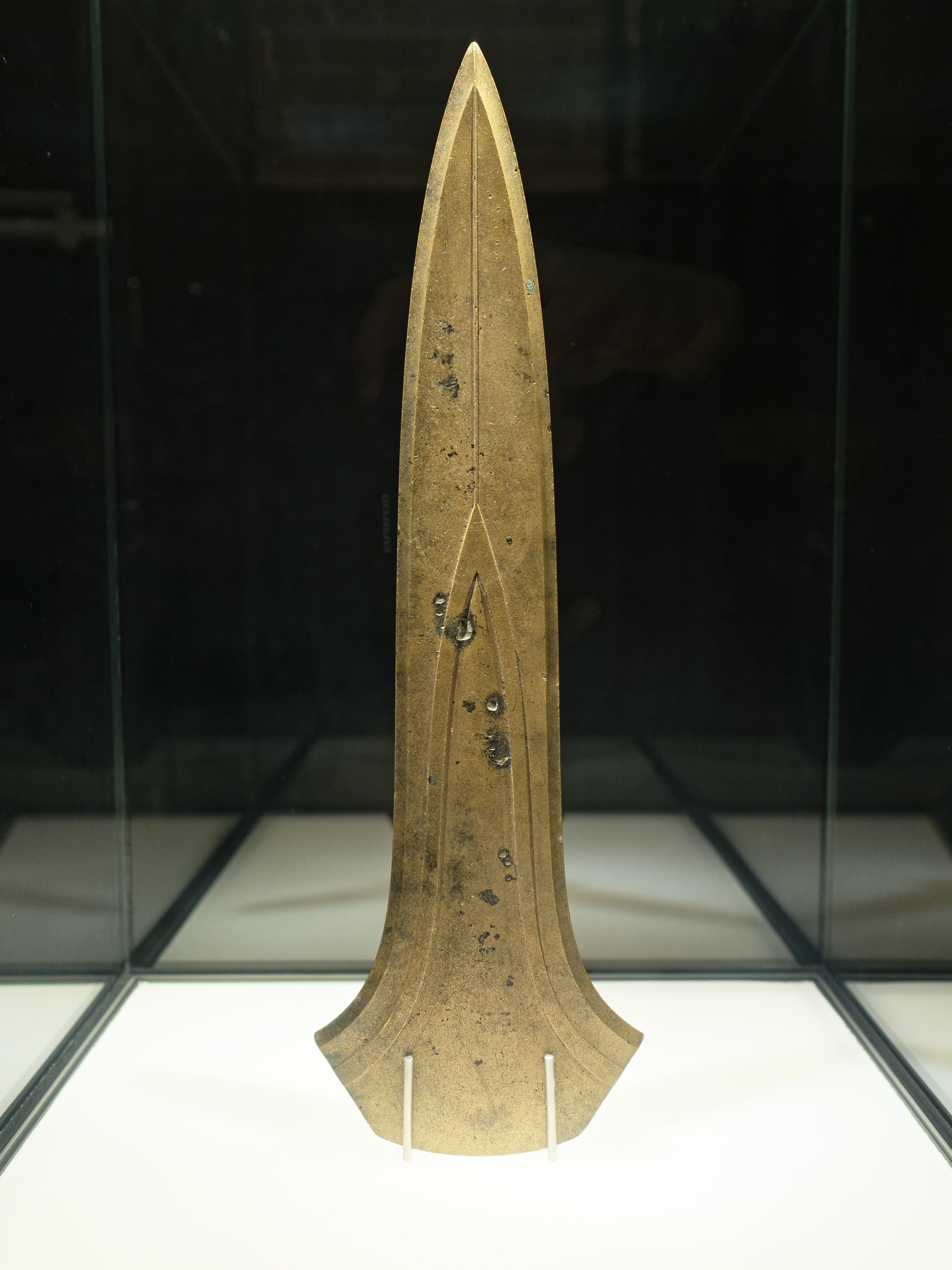
Ceremonial Sword of Jutphaas, c. 1800 - 1500 BC

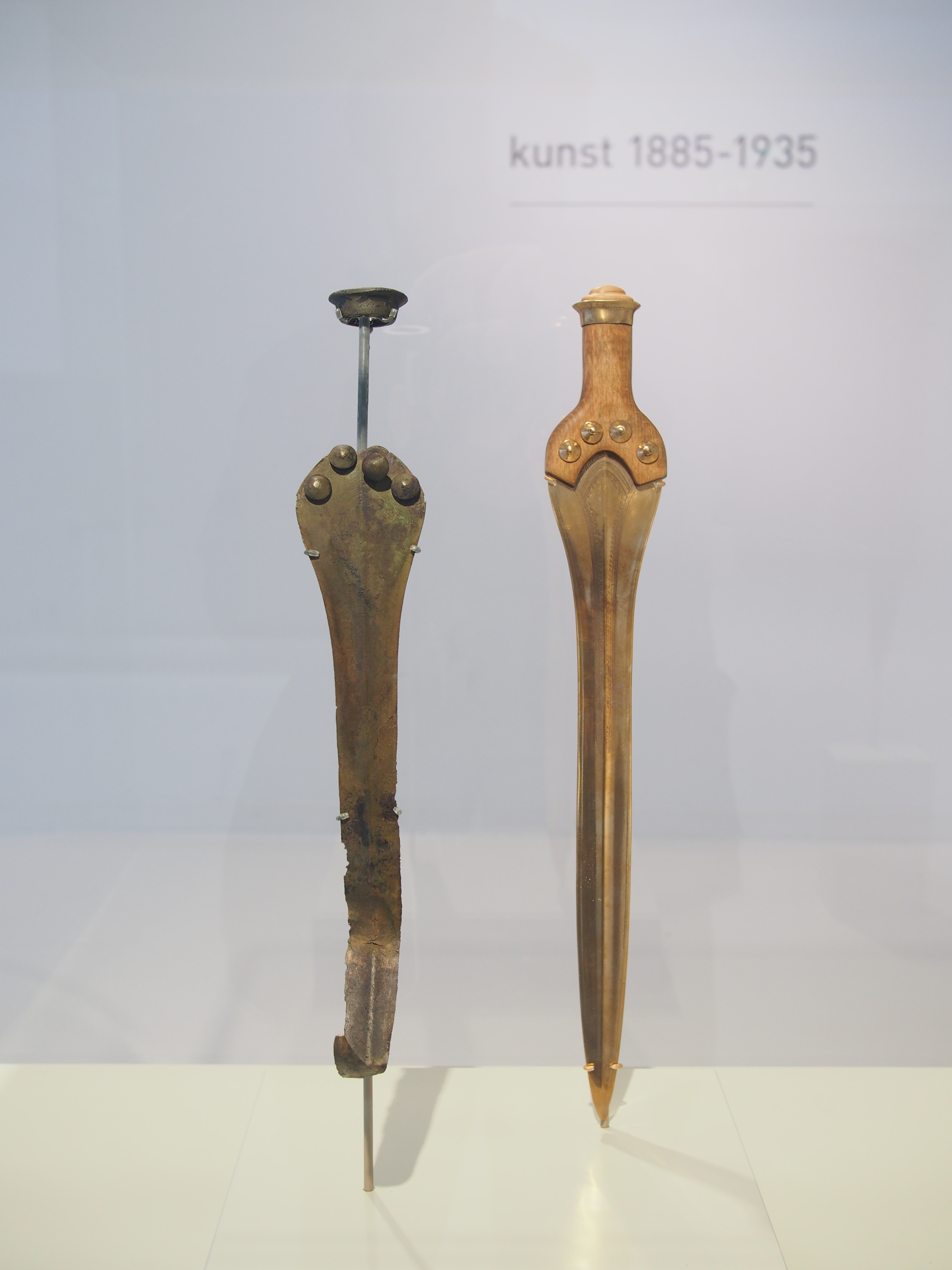
Echten sword, Elp culture, c. 1600 BC

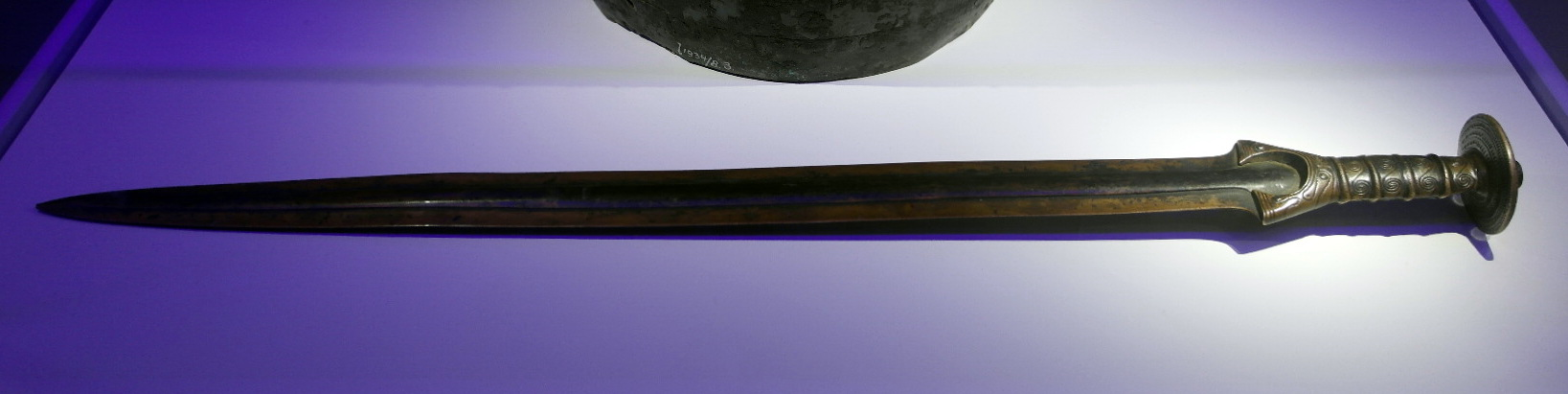
Bronze sword from Buggenum, 1300-1100 BC

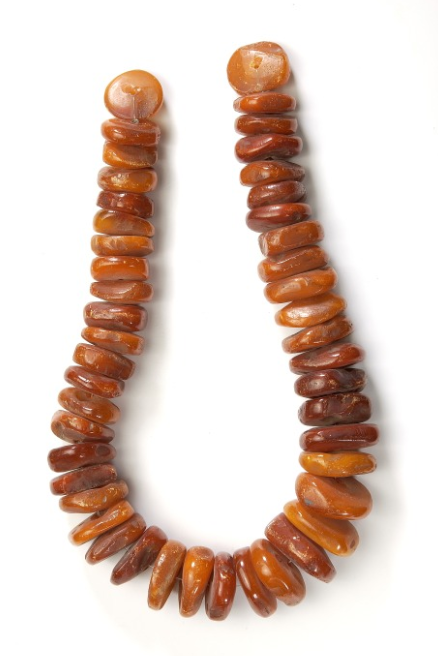
Amber necklace, Hilversum culture

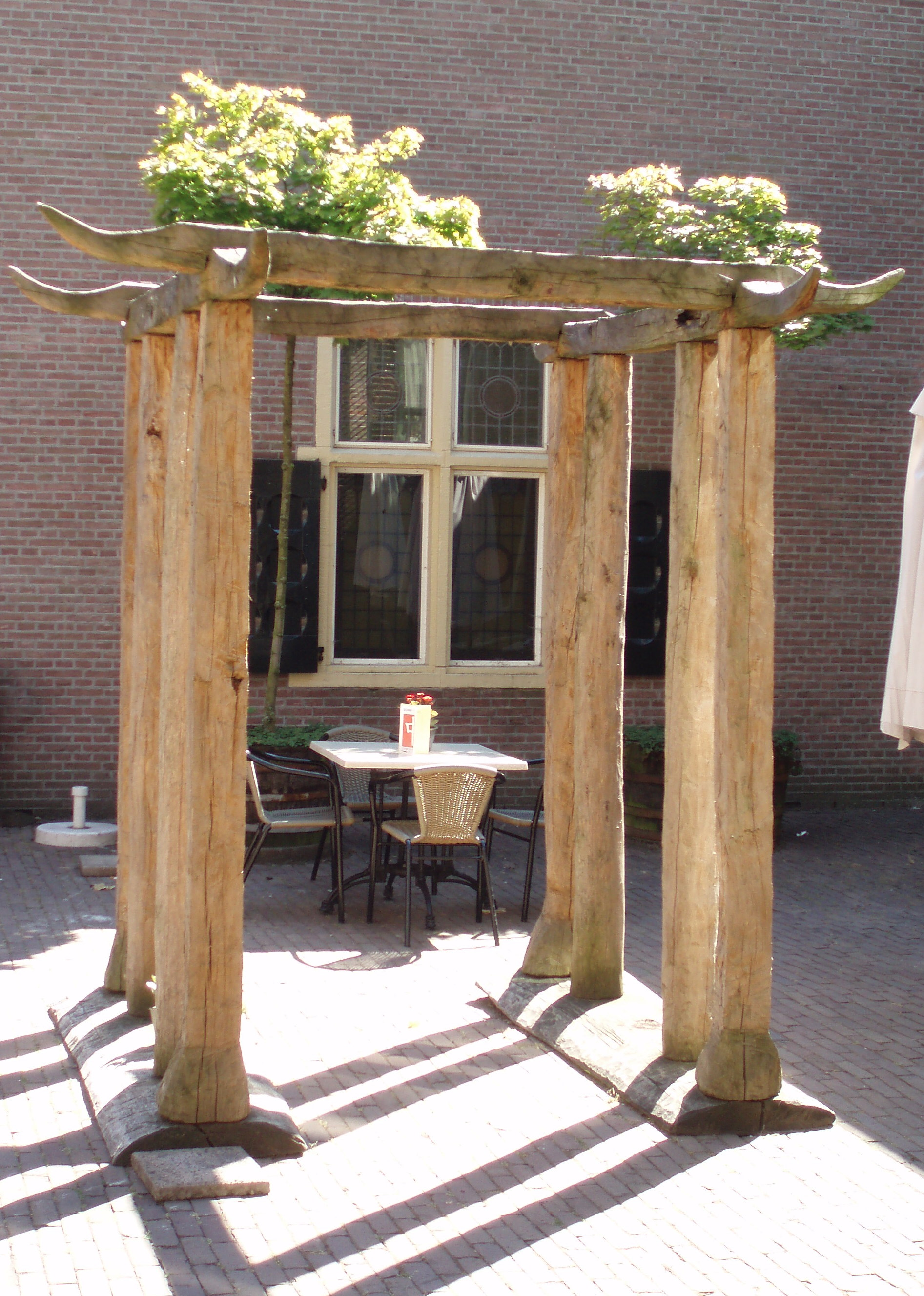
Elp culture temple at Barger-Oosterveld, c. 1250 BC

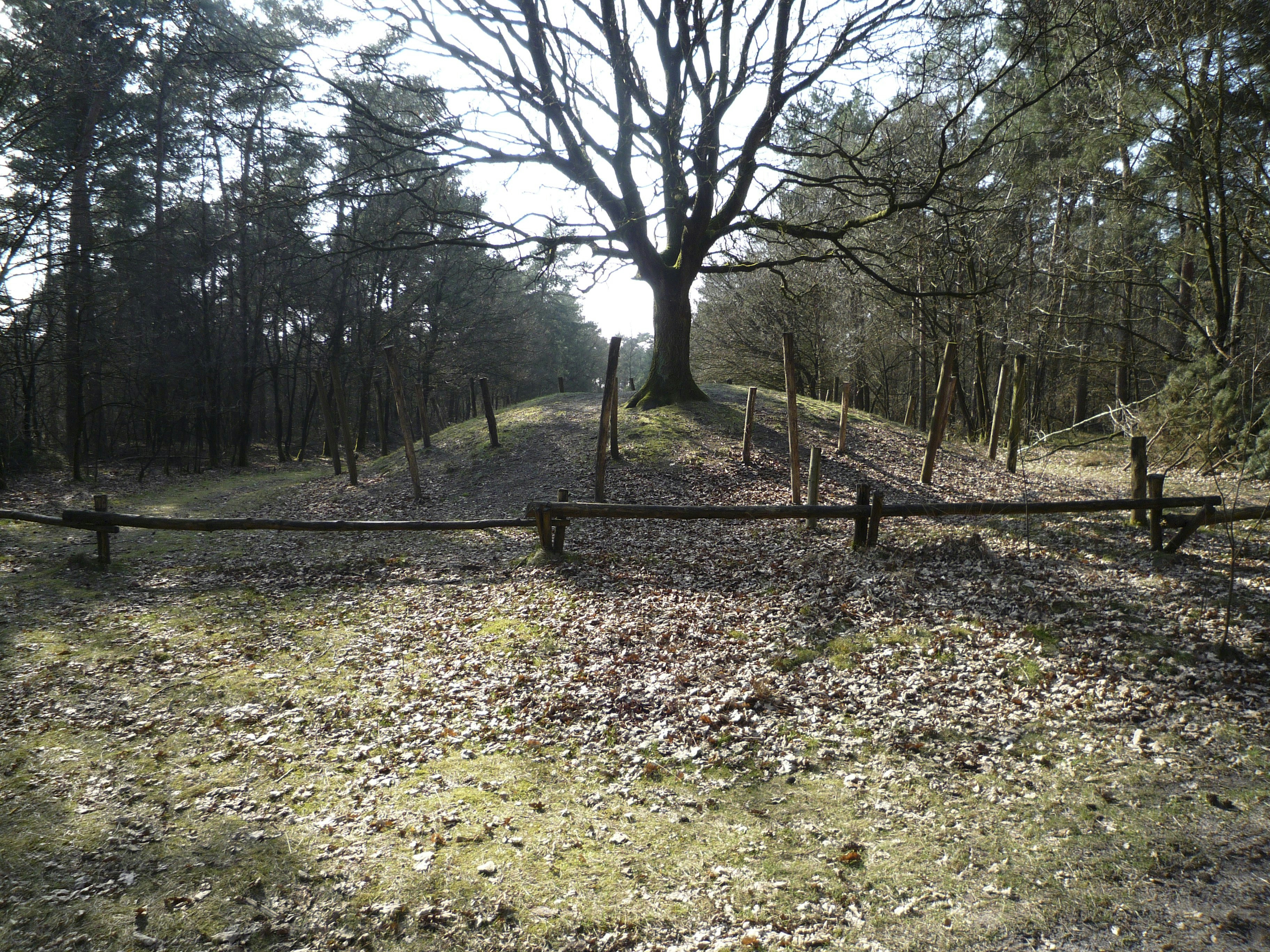
Hilversum culture burial mound

== The pre-Roman period (800 BC – 58 BC) ==
=== Iron Age ===
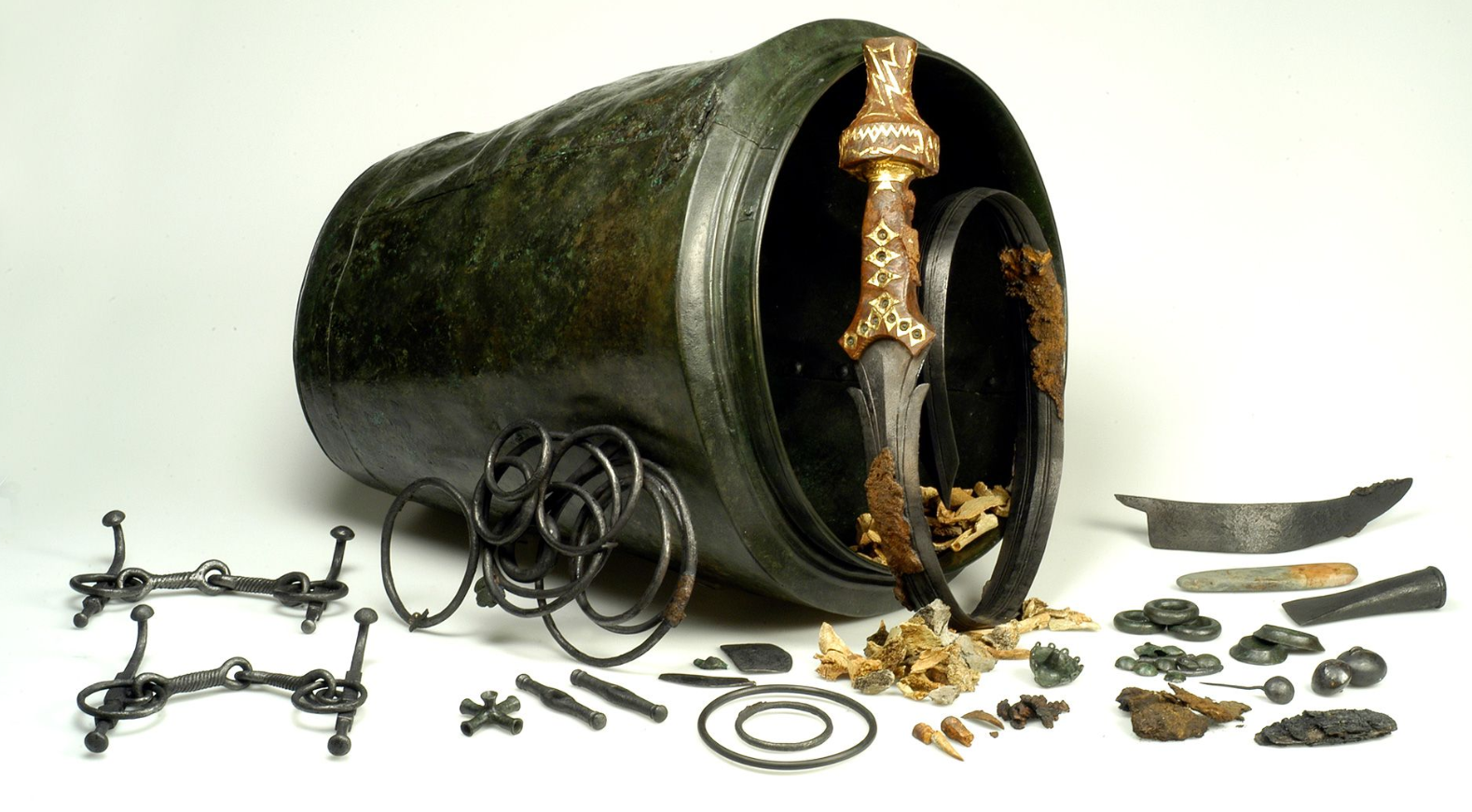
Finds from the King's grave of Oss

The Iron Age brought a measure of prosperity to the people living in the area of the present-day Netherlands. Iron ore was available throughout the country, including bog iron extracted from the ore in peat bogs (moeras ijzererts) in the north, the natural iron-bearing balls found in the Veluwe and the red iron ore near the rivers in Brabant. Smiths travelled from small settlement to settlement with bronze and iron, fabricating tools on demand, including axes, knives, pins, arrowheads and swords. Some evidence even suggests the making of Damascus steel swords using an advanced method of forging that combined the flexibility of iron with the strength of steel.

In Oss, a grave dating from around 700 BC was found in a burial mound 52 metres wide (and thus the largest of its kind in western Europe). Dubbed the "king's grave" (Vorstengraf (Oss)), it contained extraordinary objects, including an iron sword with an inlay of gold and coral.

In the centuries just before the arrival of the Romans, northern areas formerly occupied by the Elp culture emerged as the probably Germanic Harpstedt culture while the southern parts were influenced by the Hallstatt culture and assimilated into the Celtic La Tène culture. The contemporary southern and western migration of Germanic groups and the northern expansion of the Hallstatt culture drew these peoples into each other's sphere of influence. This is consistent with Caesar's account of the Rhine forming the boundary between Celtic and Germanic tribes.

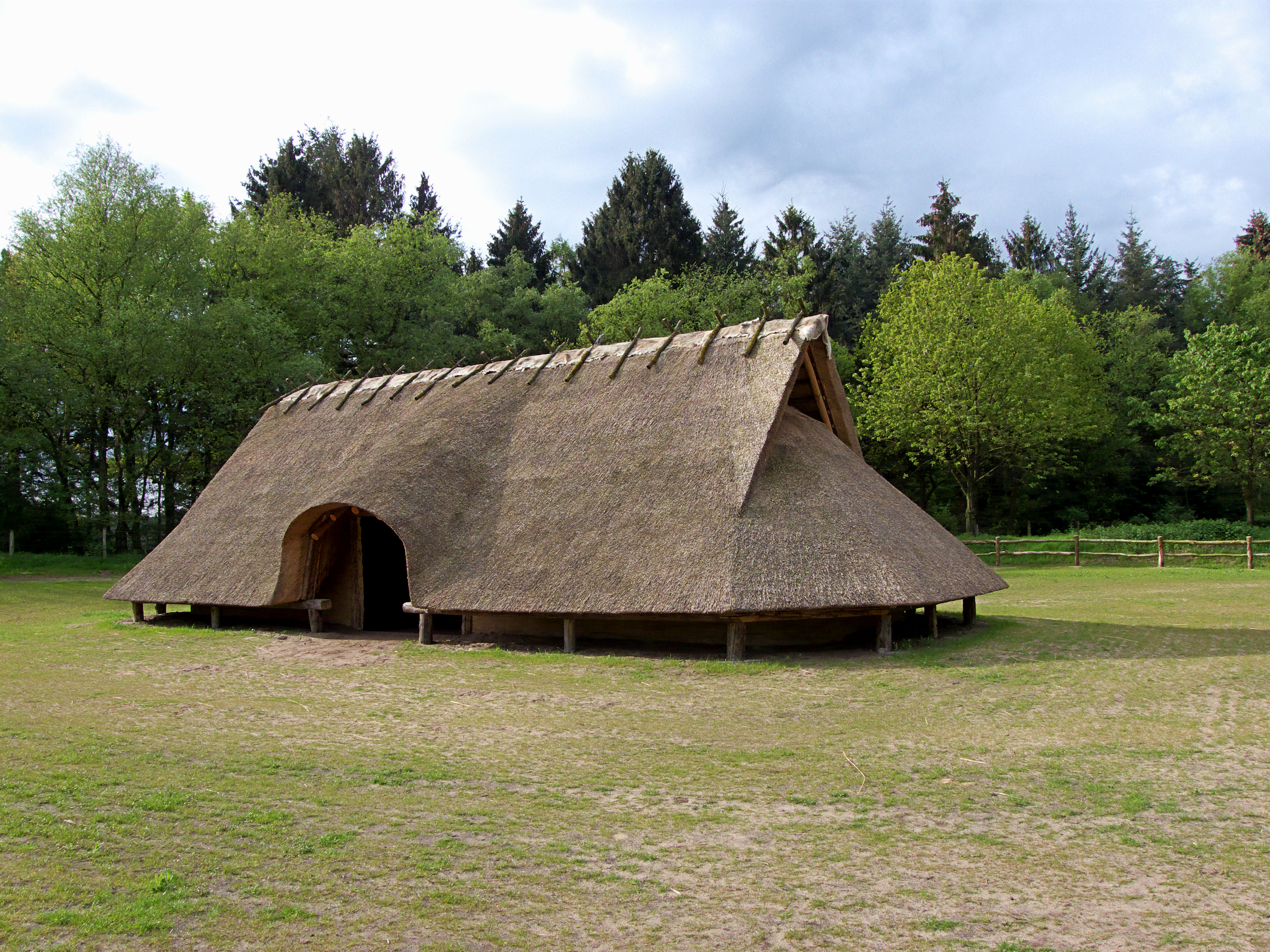
Reconstruction of an Iron Age house near Orvelte in Drenthe

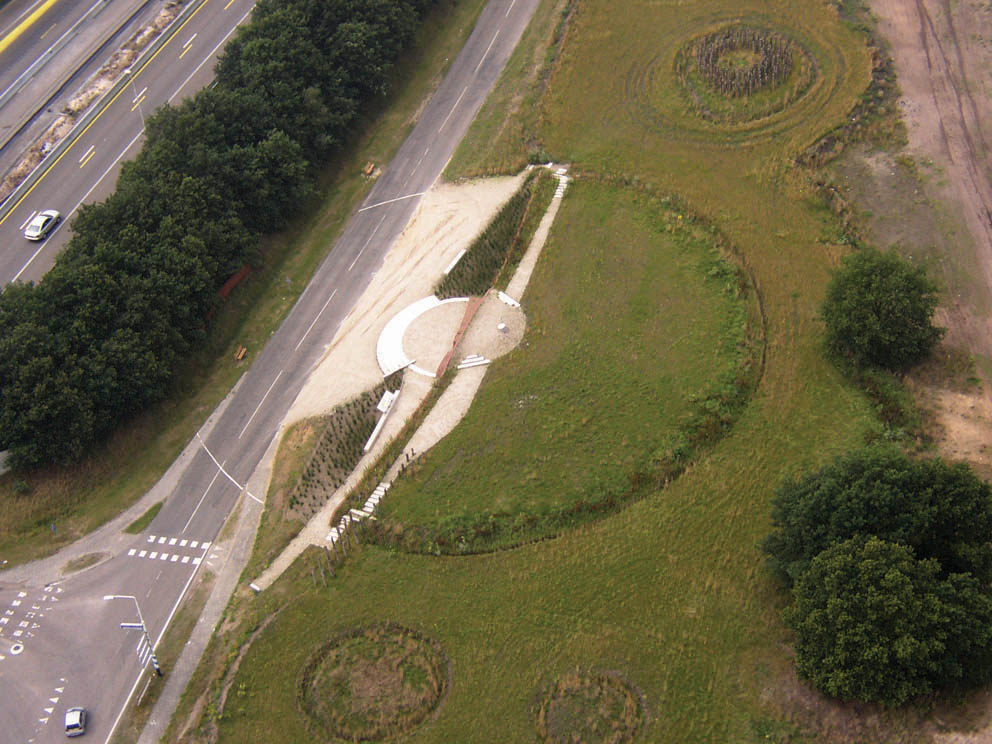
The King's grave of Oss seen from the air

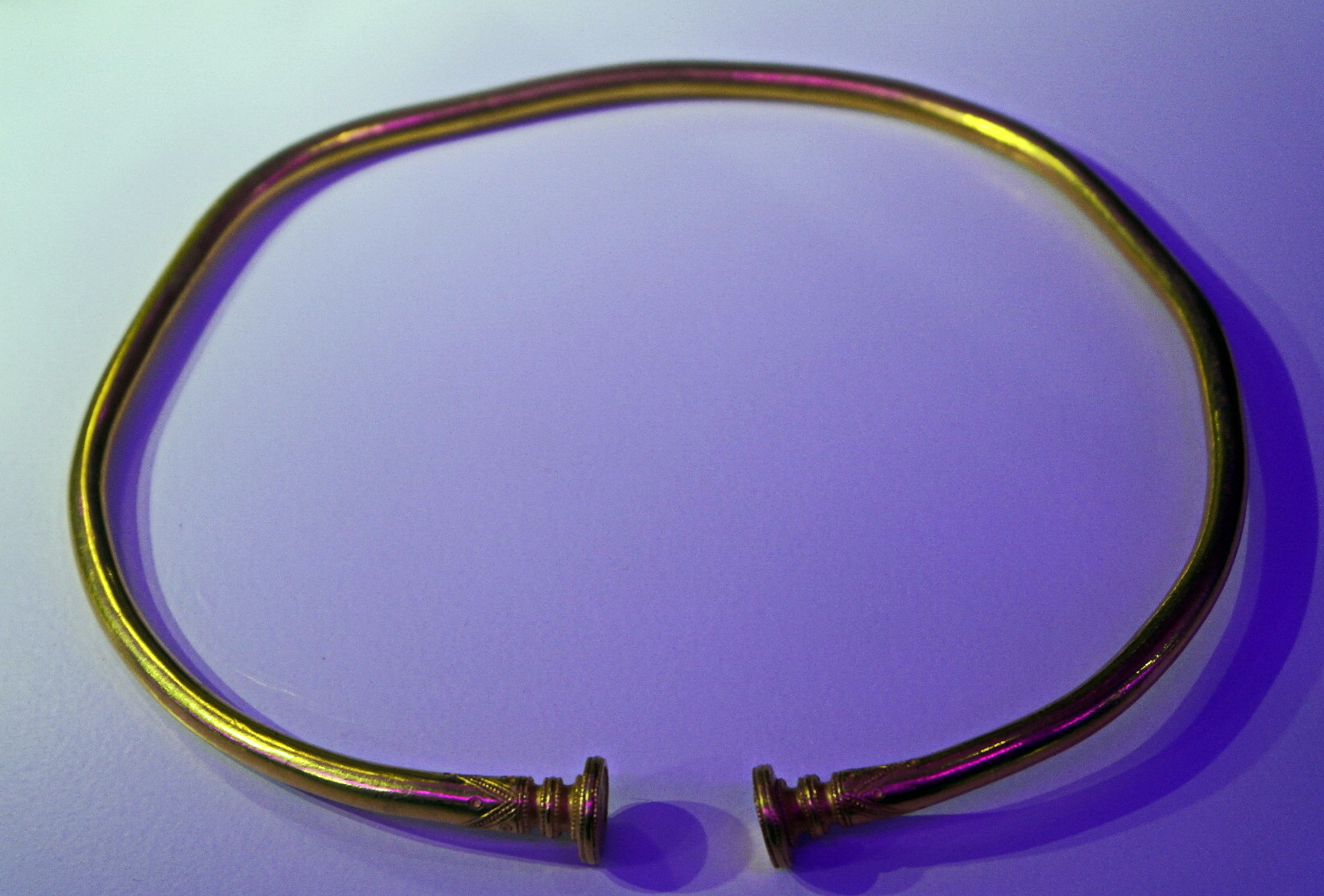
Gold torc, c. 500-1 BC

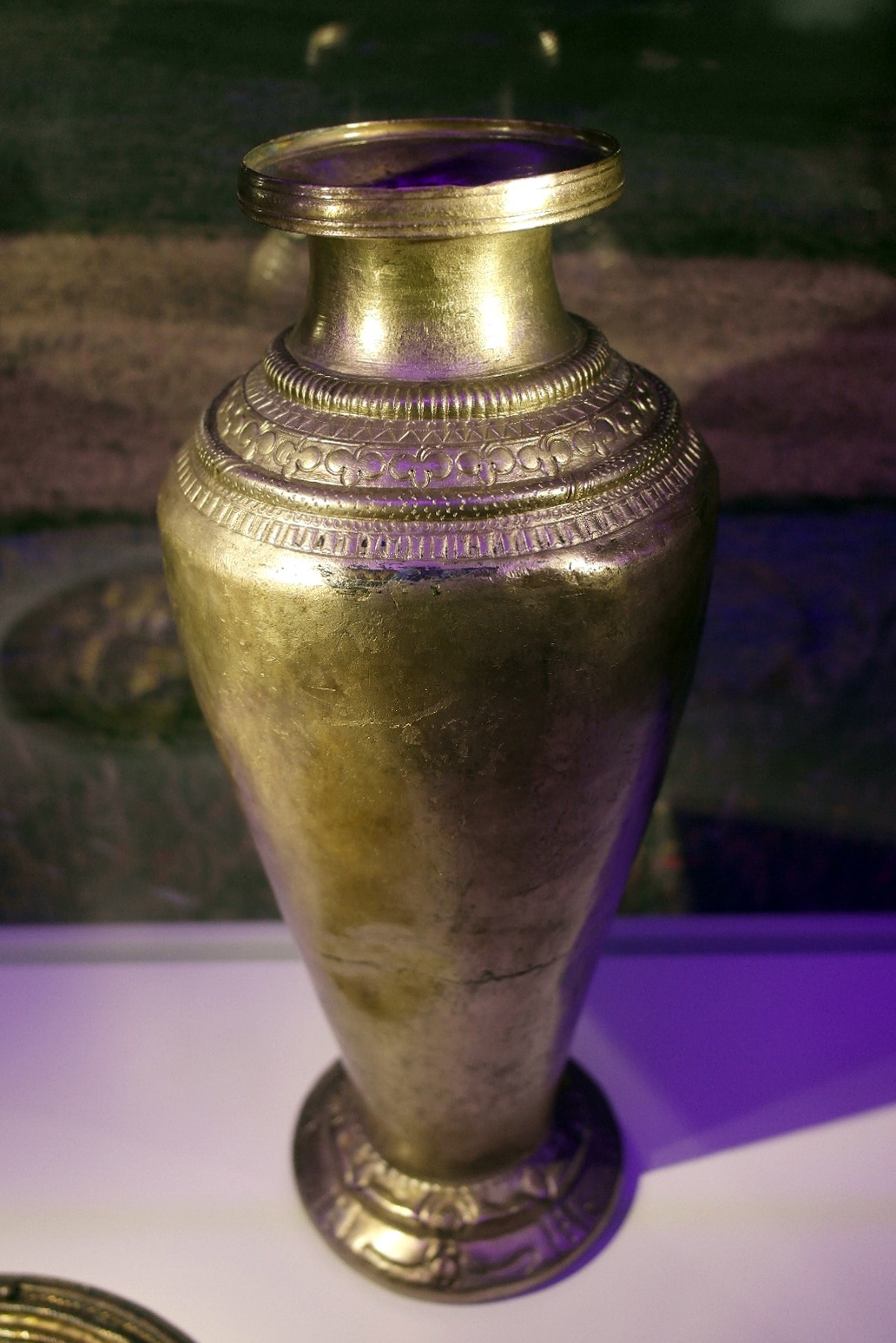
Silver amphora, c. 500-1 BC

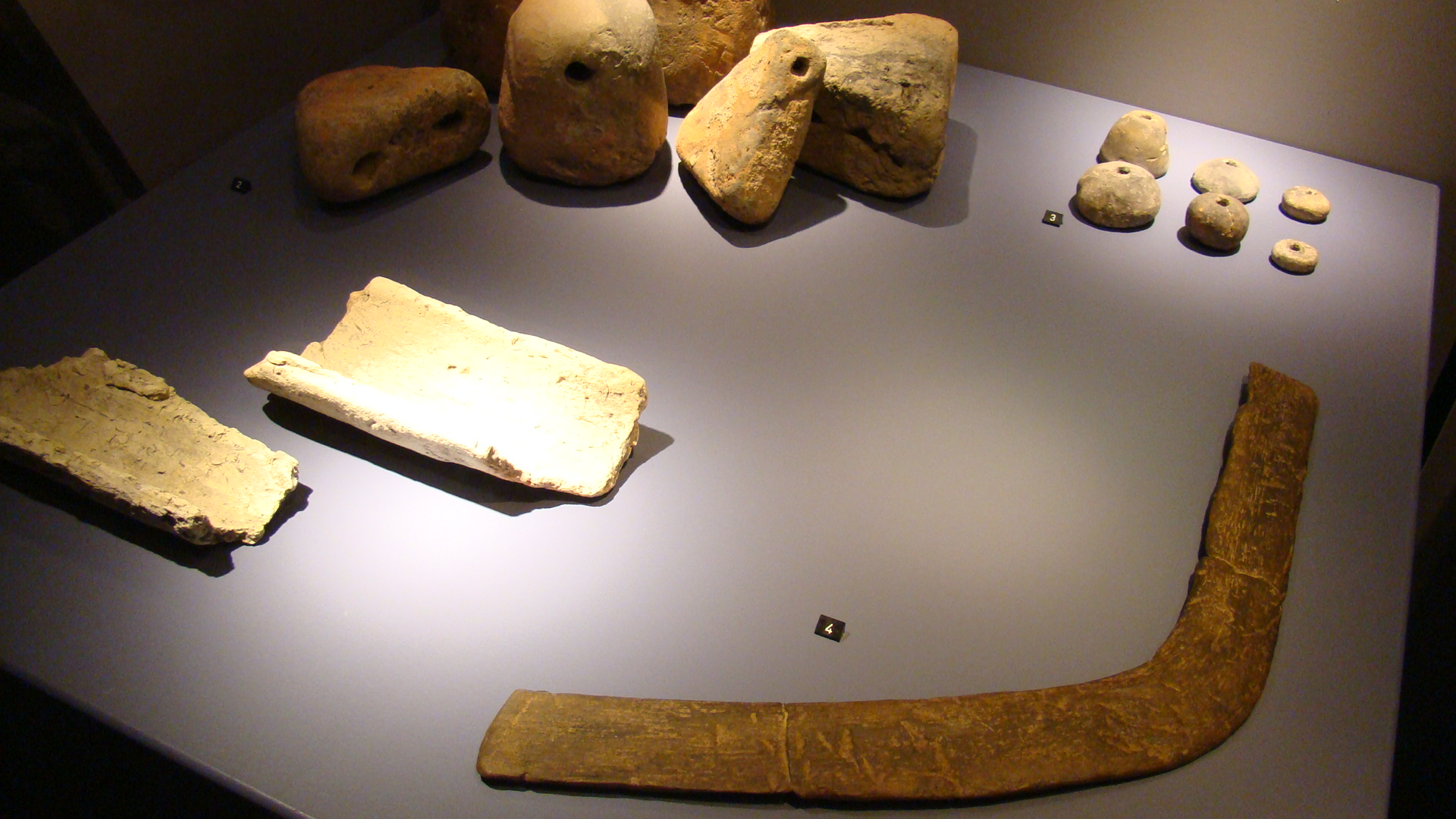
Boomerang from Velsen, c. 550 BC

=== Arrival of Germanic groups ===
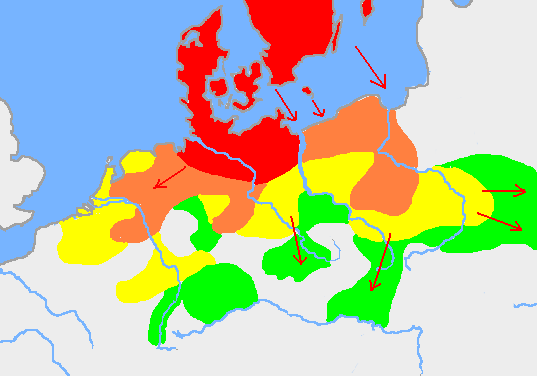
Distribution of the primary Germanic groups c. 1 AD

The Germanic tribes originally inhabited southern Scandinavia, Jutland peninsula and northern Germany, but subsequent Iron Age cultures of the same region, like Wessenstedt (800–600 BC) and Jastorf, also belonged to this grouping. The climate deteriorating in Scandinavia around 850 BC to 760 BC and later and faster around 650 BC might have triggered migrations. Archaeological evidence suggests around 750 BC a relatively uniform Germanic people came to the Netherlands from the Vistula and southern Scandinavia. In the west, the newcomers settled the coastal floodplains for the first time, since in adjacent higher grounds the population had increased and the soil had become exhausted.

By the time this migration was complete, around 250 BC, a few general cultural and linguistic groupings had emerged.

One grouping – labelled the "North Sea Germanic" – inhabited the northern part of the Netherlands (north of the great rivers) and extending along the North Sea and into Jutland. This group is also sometimes referred to as the "Ingvaeones". Included in this group are the peoples who would later develop into, among others, the early Frisians and the early Saxons.

A second grouping, which scholars subsequently dubbed the "Weser–Rhine Germanic" (or "Rhine–Weser Germanic"), extended along the middle Rhine and Weser and inhabited the southern part of the Netherlands (south of the great rivers). This group, also sometimes referred to as the "Istvaeones", consisted of tribes that would eventually develop into the Salian Franks.

=== Celts in the south ===
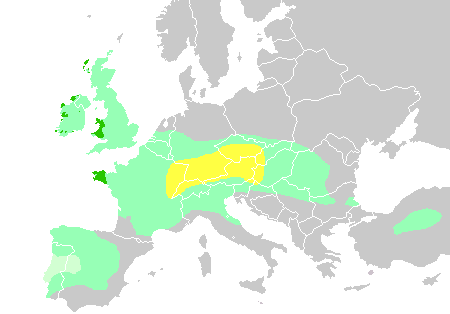
Diachronic distribution of Celtic peoples, showing expansion into the southern Netherlands: core Hallstatt territory, by the 6th century BC maximal Celtic expansion, by 275 BC Lusitanian area of Iberia where Celtic presence is uncertain areas where Celtic languages remain widely spoken today

The Celtic culture had its origins in the central European Hallstatt culture (c. 800–450 BC), named for the rich grave finds in Hallstatt, Austria. By the later La Tène period (c. 450 BC up to the Roman conquest), this Celtic culture had, whether by diffusion or migration, expanded over a wide range, including into the southern area of the Netherlands. This would have been the northern reach of the Gauls.

In March 2005 17 Celtic coins were found in Echt (Limburg). The silver coins, mixed with copper and gold, date from around 50 BC to 20 AD. In October 2008 a hoard of 39 gold coins and 70 silver Celtic coins was found in the Amby area of Maastricht. The gold coins were attributed to the Eburones people. Celtic objects have also been found in the area of Zutphen.

Although it is rare for hoards to be found, in past decades loose Celtic coins and other objects have been found throughout the central, eastern and southern part of the Netherlands. According to archaeologists these finds confirmed that at least the Meuse (Dutch: Maas) river valley in the Netherlands was within the influence of the La Tène culture. Dutch archaeologists even speculate that Zutphen (which lies in the centre of the country) was a Celtic area before the Romans arrived, not a Germanic one at all.

Scholars debate the actual extent of the Celtic influence. The Celtic influence and contacts between Gaulish and early Germanic culture along the Rhine is assumed to be the source of a number of Celtic loanwords in Proto-Germanic. But according to Belgian linguist Luc van Durme, toponymic evidence of a former Celtic presence in the Low Countries is near to utterly absent. Although there were Celts in the Netherlands, Iron Age innovations did not involve substantial Celtic intrusions and featured a local development from Bronze Age culture.

=== The Nordwestblock theory ===
Some scholars (De Laet, Gysseling, Hachmann, Kossack & Kuhn) have speculated that a separate ethnic identity, neither Germanic nor Celtic, survived in the Netherlands until the Roman period. They see the Netherlands as having been part of an Iron Age "Nordwestblock" stretching from the Somme to the Weser. Their view is that this culture, which had its own language, was being absorbed by the Celts to the south and the Germanic peoples from the east as late as the immediate pre-Roman period.

The first author to describe the coast of Holland and Flanders was the Greek geographer Pytheas, who noted in c. 325 BC that in these regions, "more people died in the struggle against water than in the struggle against men."

== See also ==
- Archaeology of Northern Europe
- Stonehenge of the Netherlands
