= Hilversum culture =

Prehistoric culture in Bronze age

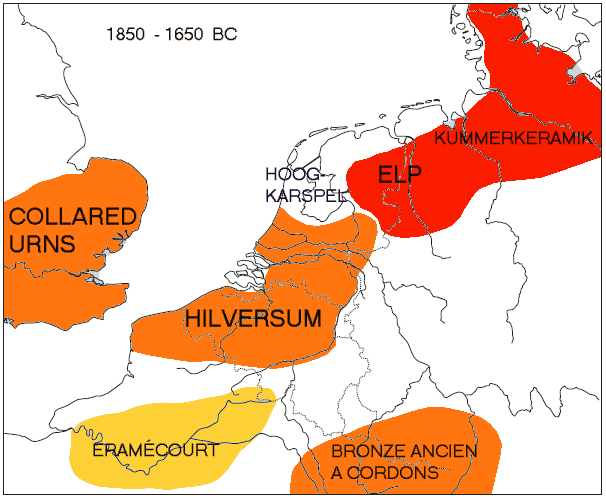
- Geographical range: Netherlands, Belgium, France
- Period: Bronze Age
- Dates: c. 1870 — c. 1050 BC
- Preceded by: Bell Beaker culture
- Followed by: Atlantic Bronze Age, Urnfield culture

The Hilversum culture is a prehistoric material culture found in middle Bronze Age in the region of the southern Netherlands and northern Belgium. It has been associated with the Wessex culture from the same period in southern England, and is one of the material cultures of this part of northwestern continental Europe which has been proposed to have had a "Nordwestblock" language which was Indo-European, but neither Germanic nor Celtic.

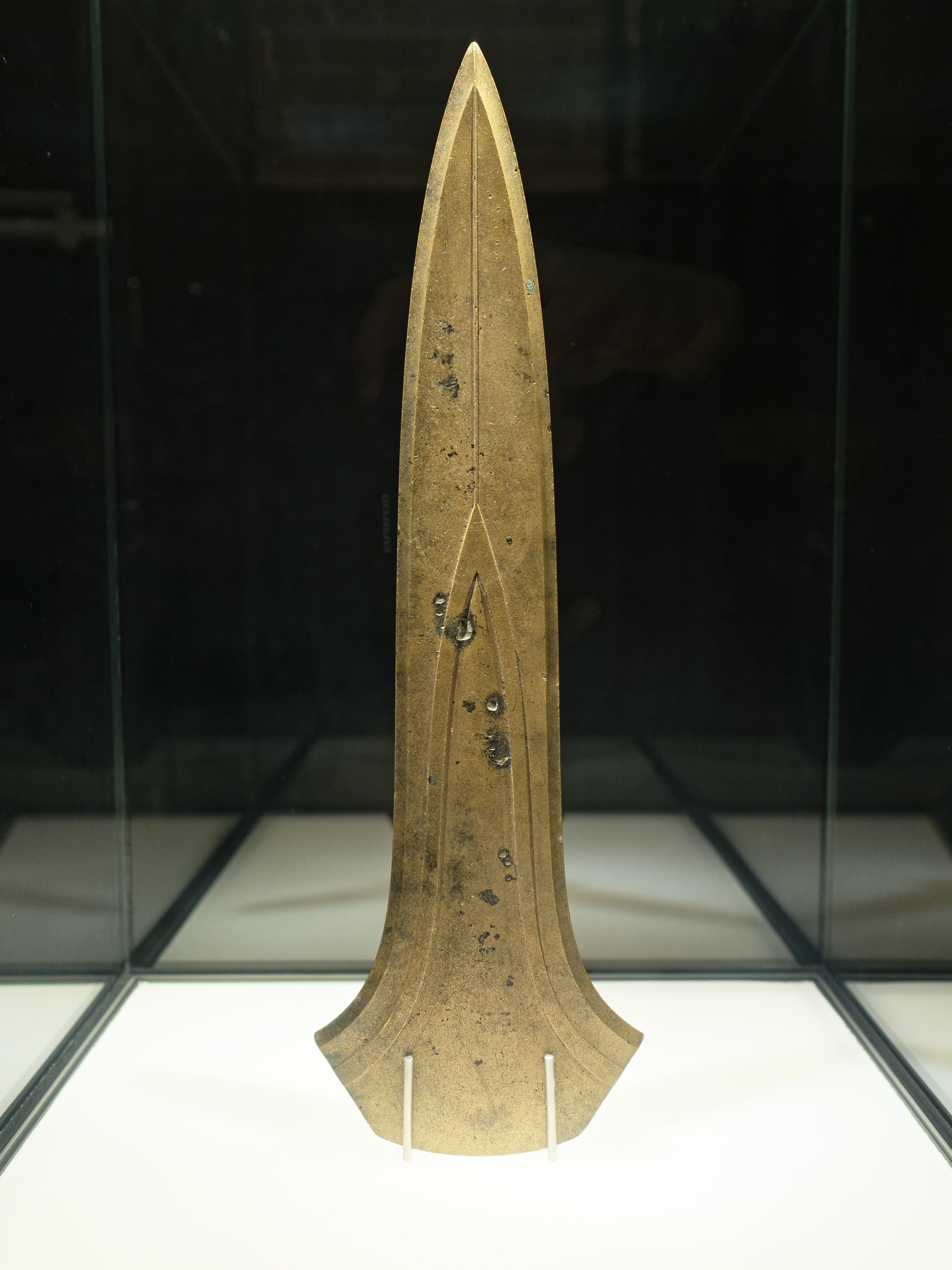
Sword of Jutphaas, c. 1800 - 1500 BC, Netherlands. Length: 42.5cm, weight: 705g

The culture was bordered to its northeast by the Elp culture, to which it may have been related, and to its north by the Hoogkarspel culture.

The concept of a distinct Hilversum culture started to develop in 1950, with the excavation of grave mounds near the hamlet of Toterfout and the nearby forest of Halve Mijl. An urn found there, initially classified as being of the Deverel–Rimbury type, was found to be older than was expected: radiocarbon dating pointed to 3450 BP (1770 +/-250 cal BC). This led archeologist Willem Glasbergen to propose a new classification, the Hilversum type, and the conclusion that later continental Deverel pottery would have "devolved" from this type.

== Genetic profile ==
An individual without funerary context was found in the Krabbeplas artificial lake (Vlaardingen, Zuid-Holland province), he was dated to 1421-1216 cal BCE, his Y-chromosome DNA was R1b-S497 (a derivation from R1b-U106).

== Gallery ==
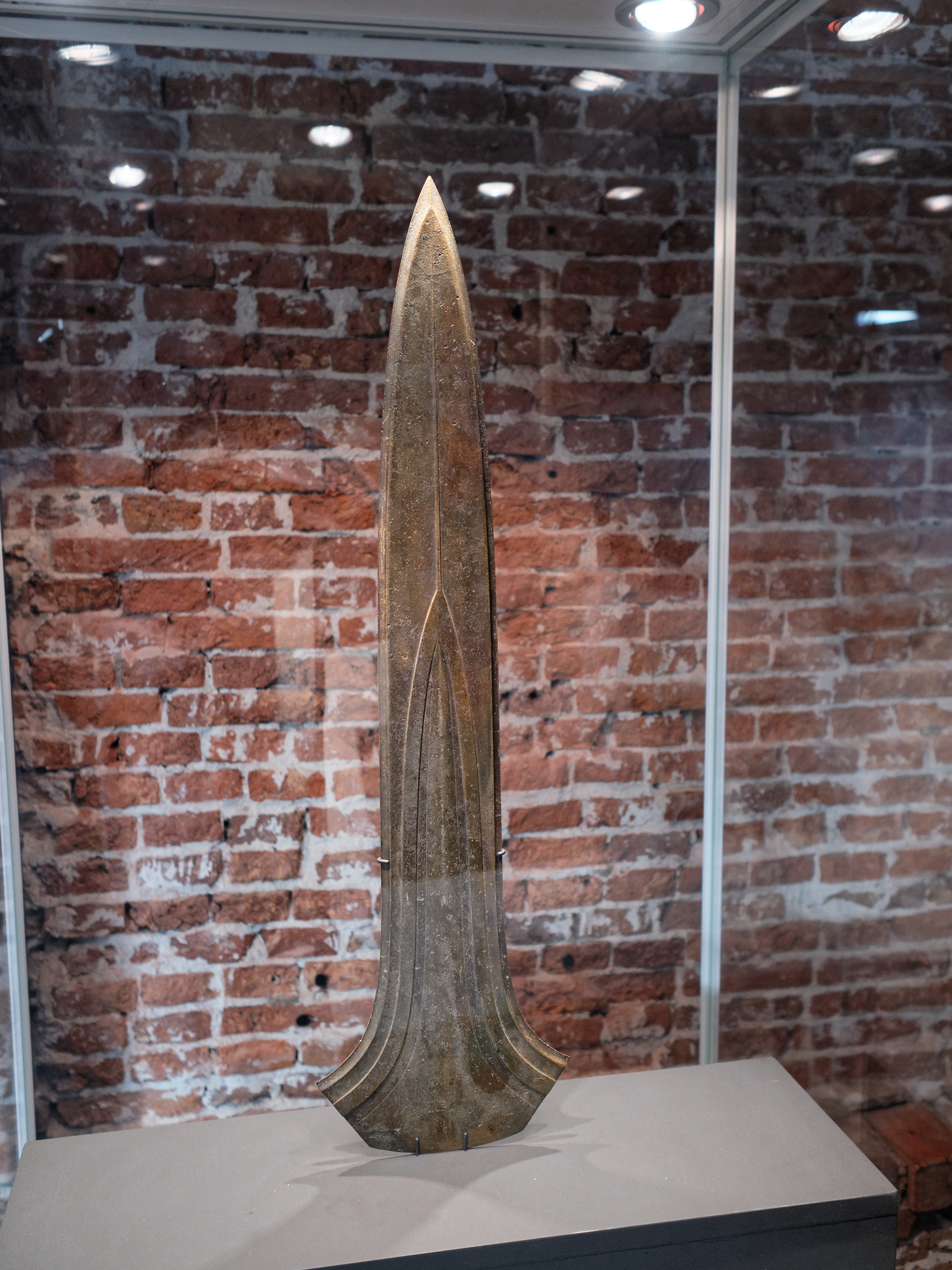
Sword of Ommerschans, Netherlands, c. 1500 BC. Length: 68.3 cm, weight: 2.8 kg

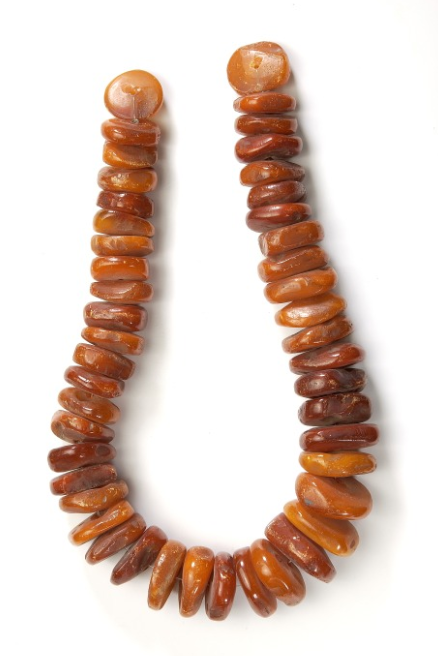
Amber necklace discovered in Utrecht

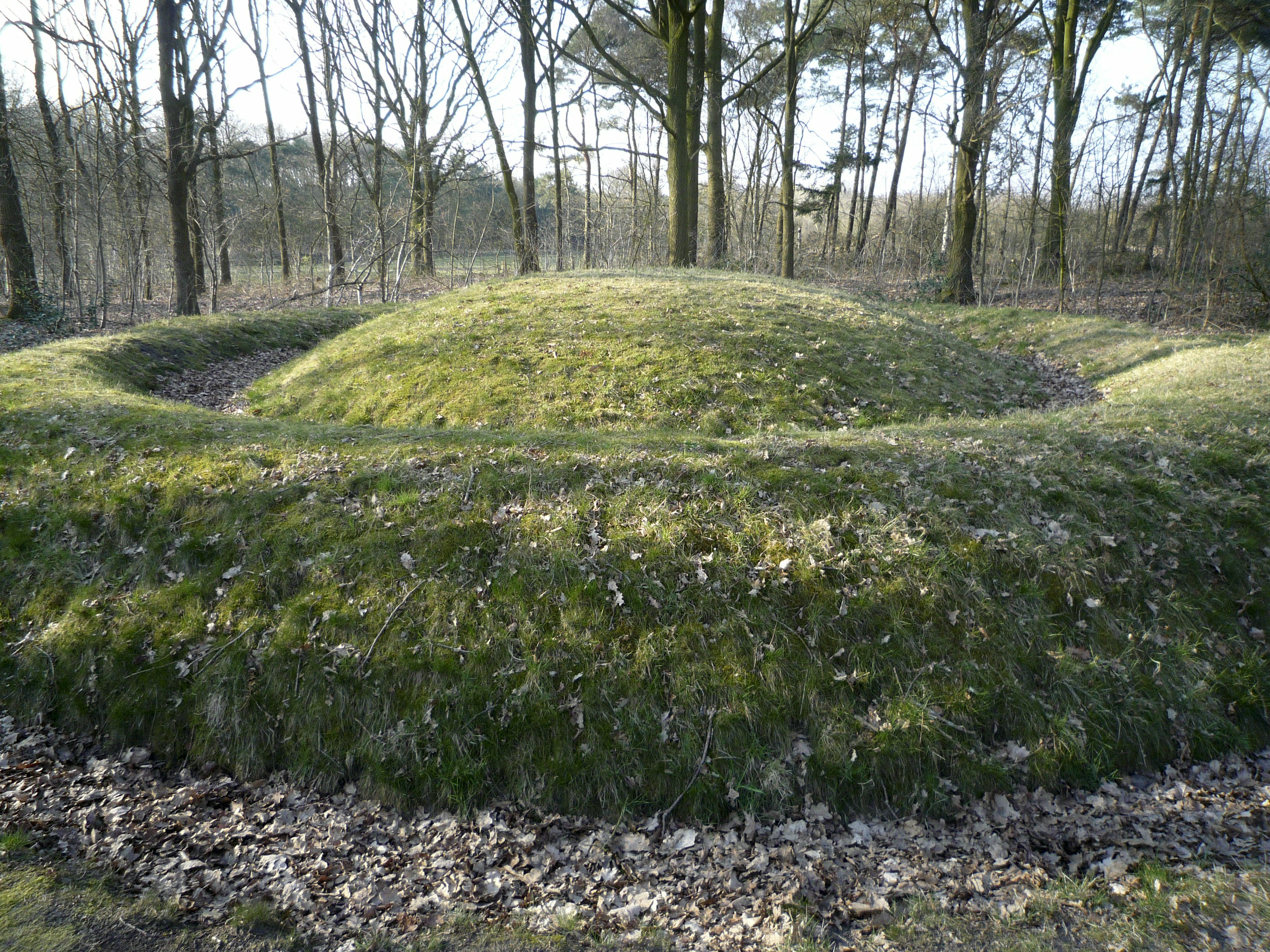
Burial mound, Netherlands

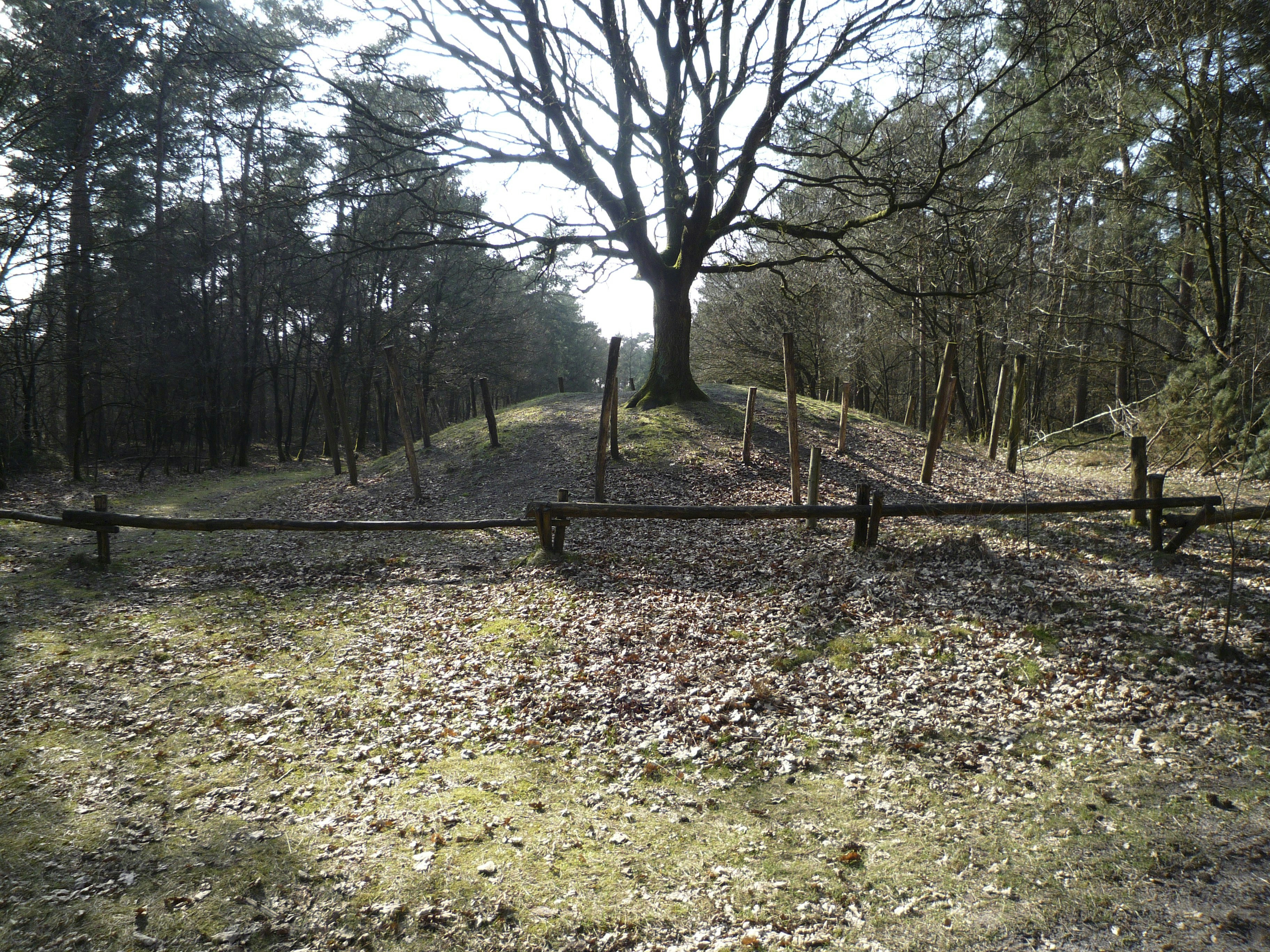
Burial mound, Netherlands

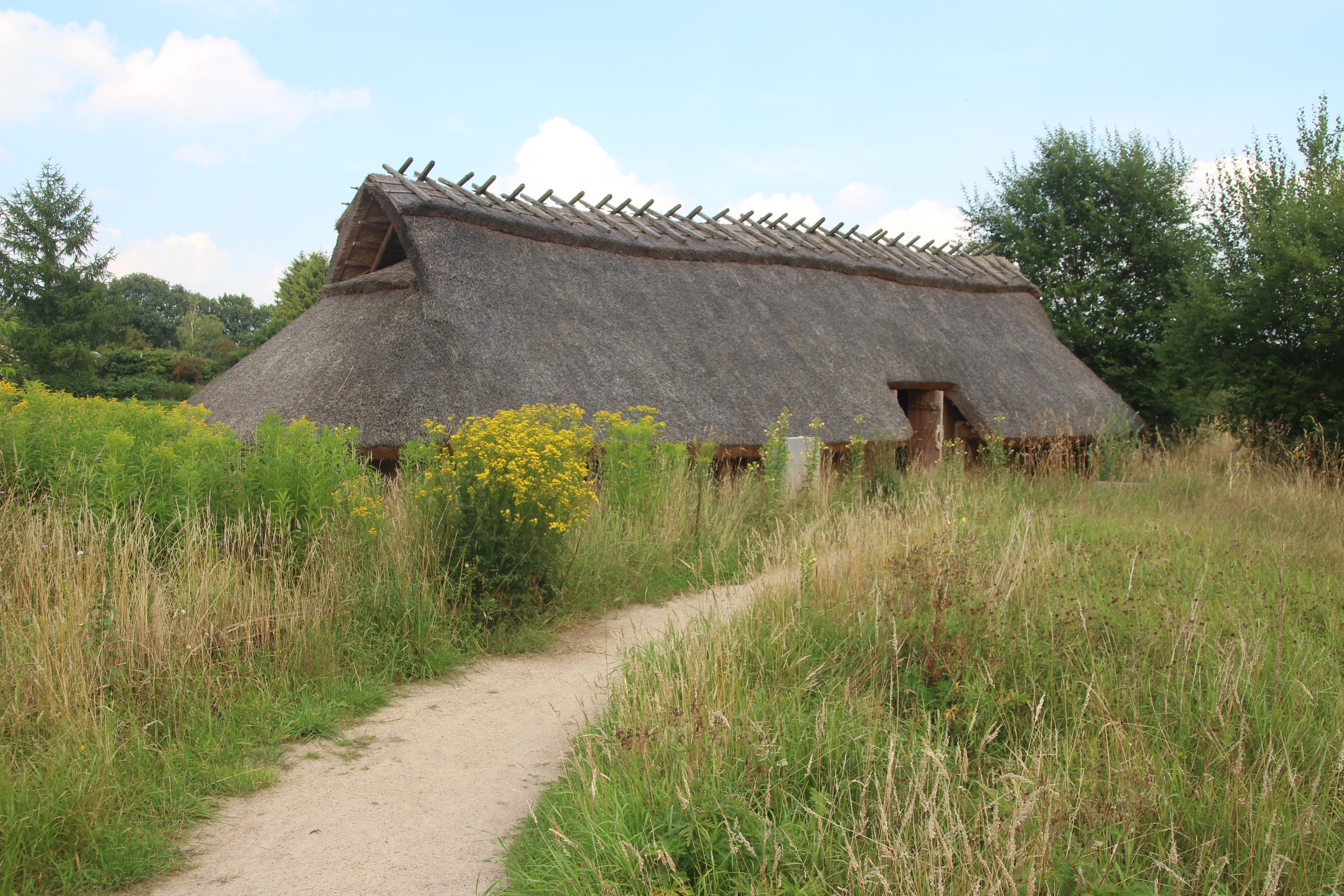
Bronze Age house reconstruction, Netherlands

== See also ==
- Prehistory of the Netherlands
- Bronze Age Britain
- Unetice culture
- Armorican Tumulus culture
- Tumulus culture
- Nordic Bronze Age
- Argaric culture
