= Vlaardingen culture =

Neolithic archaeological culture in the Netherlands

- Geographical range: Costal Netherlands
- Period: Neolithic
- Dates: c. 3500 BC – c. 2500 BC
- Preceded by: Swifterbant culture
- Followed by: Single Grave culture

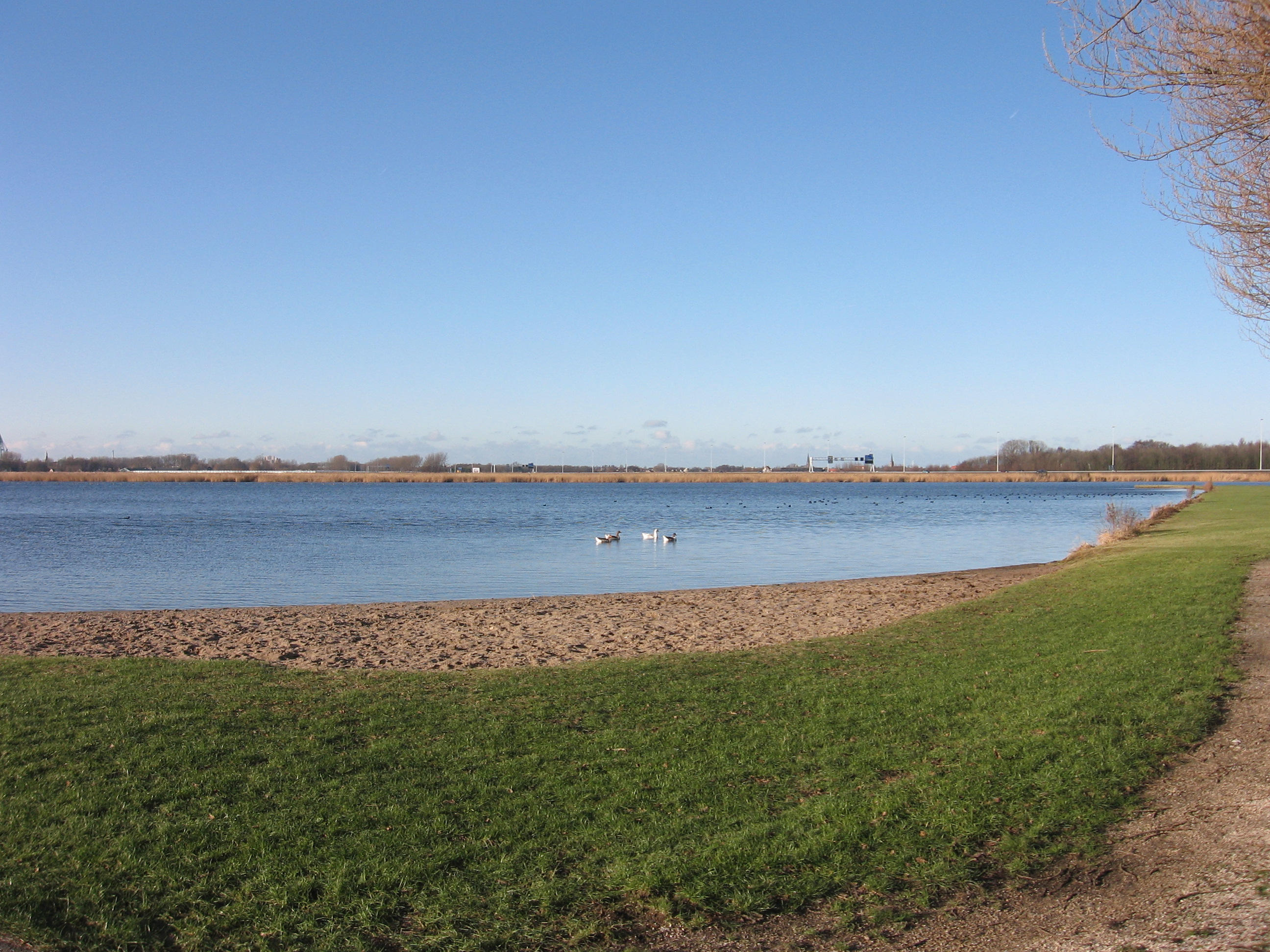
The Krabbeplas near Vlaardingen, one of the places where archeological artifacts of the Vlaardingen culture have been found

Vlaardingen Culture was an archaeological culture on the border of the middle and late Neolithic era in what is now the coastal region in the west of the Netherlands. In 1958, archeologists found objects in Vlaardingen, a city near Rotterdam, which justify the designation as a separate culture. These objects were from the period between 3500 BC and 2500 BC. Utensils were made of wood and bone, and polished small stone axes were found, which appear to originate from Belgium. Also needles and the remains of a primitive canoe were found.

This hunting and fishing culture was sedentary and semi-nomadic. In the old dunes at the then much further east lying coastline the remains of some peasant settlements were found. From these findings it can be deduced that animal husbandry (sheep and goats) and agriculture (wheat and barley) had been practised on a small scale. Vlaardingen culture also had traits of a Mesolithic hunter-gatherer society because agriculture in much of the Wadden Sea area and the Rhine–Meuse–Scheldt delta was difficult. Hunting and fishing were important means of livelihood. Bones found near the settlements of deer, bears, otters and sturgeon support that.

Vlaardingen culture co-existed with the more land inward Funnel beaker culture to which it shows similarities and differences. Based on the pottery and the occupied environment, the Vlaardingen culture and the Funnel beaker culture seem clearly distinguishable from one another. When the Funnel beaker culture ceased to exist, the Corded Ware culture succeeded it. The Vlaardingen culture, however, endured in the west (3400–2500 BC), until it was finally succeeded by the Corded Ware culture as well.
