= Swifterbant culture =

Subneolithic culture in the Netherlands

- Geographical range: Netherlands
- Period: Late Mesolithic, Subneolithic
- Dates: c. 5300 BC – c. 3400 BC
- Preceded by: Limbourg culture
- Followed by: Vlaardingen culture Linear Pottery culture

The Swifterbant culture was a Subneolithic archaeological culture in the Netherlands, dated between 5300 BC and 3400 BC. Like the Ertebølle culture, the settlements were concentrated near water, in this case creeks, riverdunes and bogs along post-glacial banks of rivers like the Overijsselse Vecht.

In the 1960s and 1970s, artifacts classified as "Swifterbant culture" were found in the (now dry) Flevopolder in the Netherlands, near the villages of Swifterbant and Dronten. Other sites were uncovered in South Holland (Bergschenhoek) and the Betuwe (Hardinxveld-Giessendam).

== Overview ==
The oldest finds related to this culture, dated to circa 5600 BC, cannot be distinguished from the Ertebølle culture, normally associated with Northern Germany and Southern Scandinavia. The culture is ancestral to the Western group of the agricultural Funnelbeaker culture (4000–2700 BC), which extended through Northern Netherlands and Northern Germany to the Elbe.

The earliest dated sites are season settlements. A transition from hunter-gatherer culture to cattle farming, primarily cows and pigs, occurred around 4800–4500 BC. Pottery has been attested from this period. In the region indications to the existence of pottery are present from before the arrival of the Linear Pottery culture in the neighbourhood. The material culture reflects a local evolution from Mesolithic communities, with a pottery in a Nordic (Ertebølle) style and trade relationships with southern late Rössen culture communities, as testified by the presence of true Breitkeile pottery sherds.

The Rössen culture, being an offshoot of Linear Pottery, is older than the finds in Swifterbant, and contemporary to older stages of this culture as found in Hoge Vaart (Almere) and Hardinxveld. Contact between Swifterbant and Rössen expressed itself by some hybrid early Swifterbant pots in Antwerp (Doel) and hybrid Rössen pottery Hamburg-Boberg. In general, Swifterbant pottery does not show the same variety as Rössen pottery and Swifterbant pottery with Rössen influences are rare. Possibly the idea of cooking could be derived from agricultural neighbours. However, the technical style for making pottery are too different to consider such external influences.

Wetland settlement, unlike previous opinions, was a deliberate choice by prehistoric communities, as this offered attractive ecological conditions and a high natural productivity or agricultural potential. The economy covered a broad spectrum of resources to gather food, ruled by a strategy to diversify rather than increasing volume. As such, the wetlands offered, next to hunting and fishing, optimized conditions for cattle and small scale cultivation of different crops, each having conditions for growing of their own. The agrarian transformation of the prehistoric community was an exclusively indigenous process, that ultimately realized itself only at the end of the Neolithic. This view has been supported by the discovery of an agricultural field in Swifterbant dated 4300–4000 BC.

Animal sacrifices found in the bogs of Drenthe are attributed to Swifterbant and suggest a religious role for both wild and domesticated bovines.

== See also ==
- Pitted Ware culture
