= Elp culture =

Archaeological culture

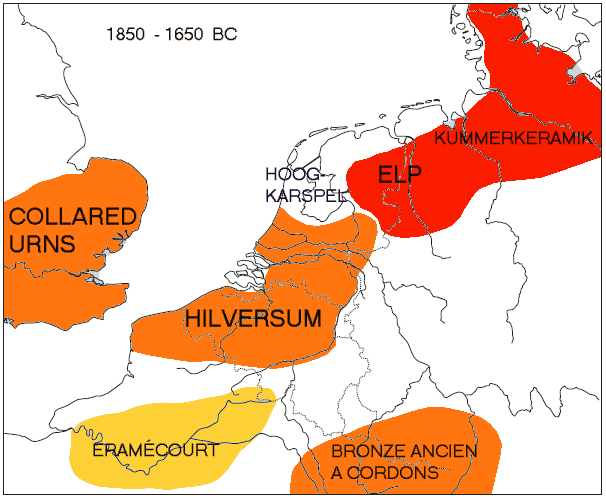
- Geographical range: Netherlands
- Period: Bronze Age
- Dates: c. 1800 - 800 BC
- Preceded by: Bell Beaker culture
- Followed by: Hallstatt culture

The Elp culture (c. 1800—800 BCE) is a Bronze Age archaeological culture of the Netherlands having earthenware pottery of low quality known as "Kummerkeramik" (also "Grobkeramik") as a marker. The initial phase is characterized by tumuli (1800–1200 BCE), strongly tied to contemporary tumuli in Northern Germany and Scandinavia, and apparently related to the Tumulus culture (1600–1200 BCE) in Central Europe. This phase was followed by a subsequent change featuring Urnfield (cremation) burial customs (1200–800 BCE).

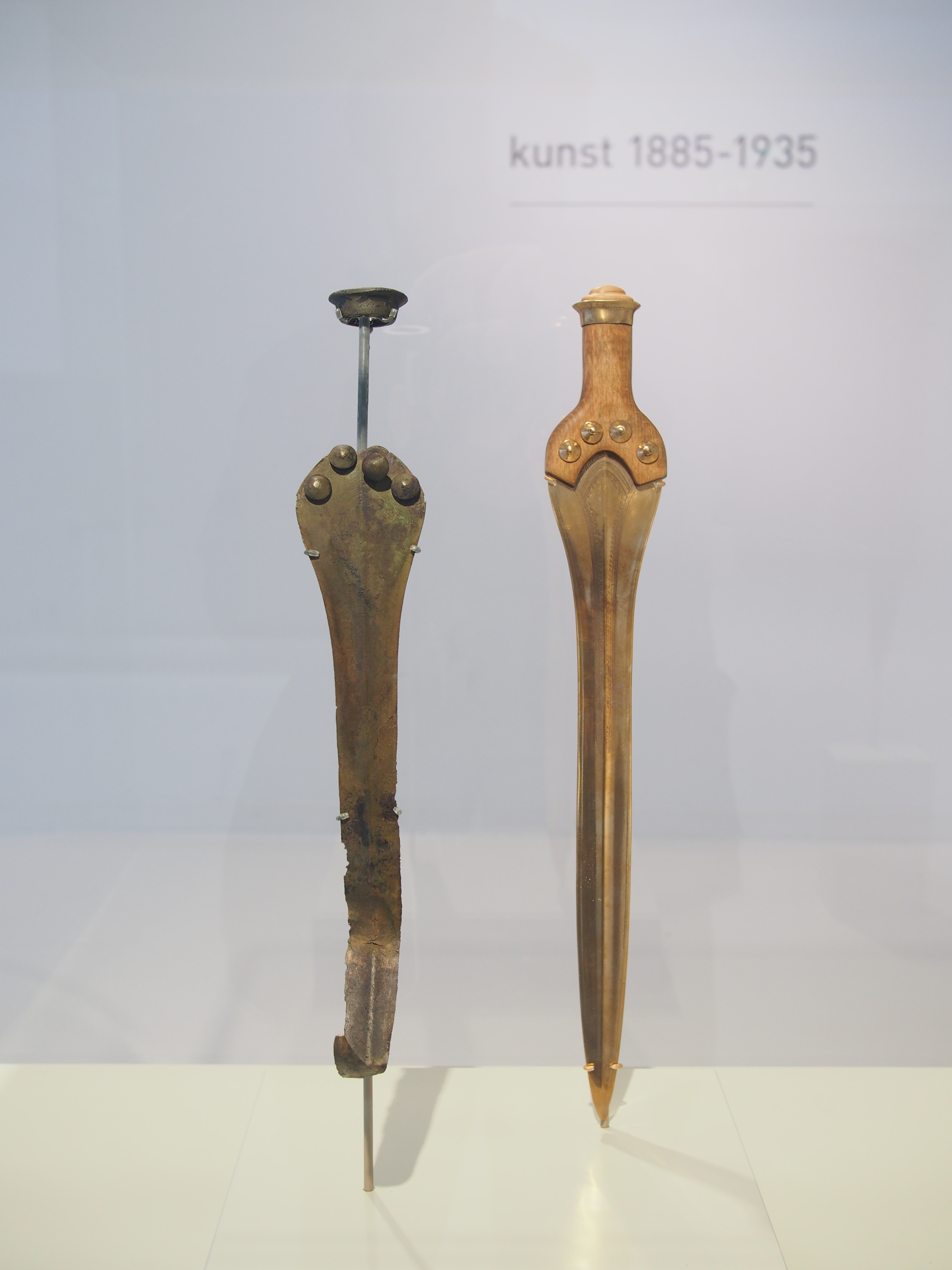
Echten sword, c. 1600 BC

Part of the "Nordwestblock", it is situated to the north and east of the Rhine and the IJssel (named after the village of Elp in Drenthe province), bordering the Hilversum culture to the south and the Hoogkarspel culture in West Friesland that, together with Elp, all derive from the Bell Beaker culture (2100–1800 BCE) and, forming a culture complex at the boundary between the Atlantic and the Nordic horizons.

First the dead were buried in shallow pits and covered by a low barrow. At the end of the Bronze Age they were cremated and the urns were gathered in low barrows. Family burials occurred only in the later stages.

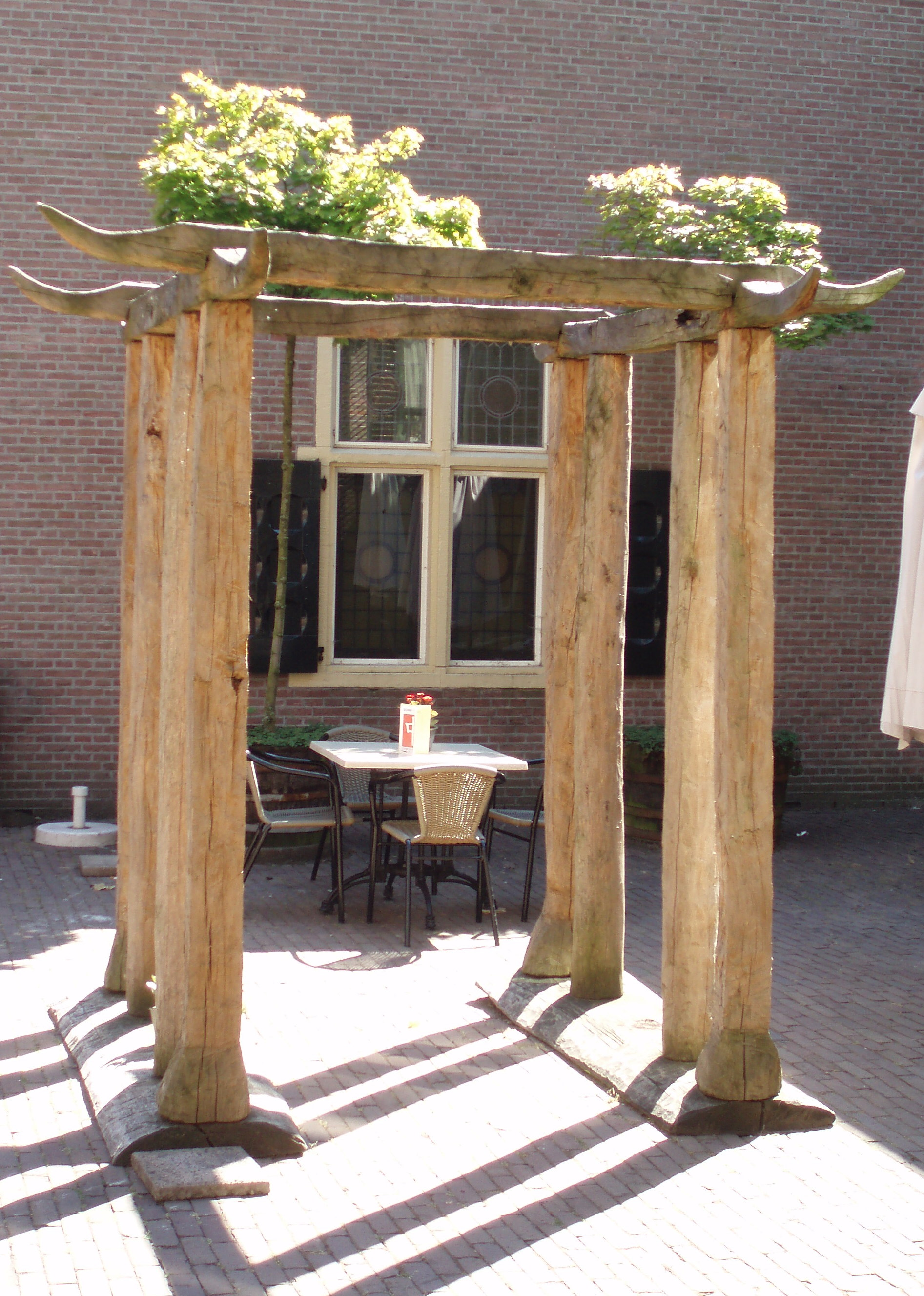
Elp culture temple at Barger-Oosterveld, c. 1250 BC

The culture is known for featuring the longhouse. This construction shows an exceptional local continuity until the twentieth century, still being the normal type of farm in the lowlands of north-western Europe and the Netherlands. The local tradition of concentrating on raising cattle was persisted by the Saxons and the Frisians, whose houses were perched on the natural hillocks in the moist plains, while all other Germanic people practiced sedentary agriculture. Going back to the roots of this tradition, it is generally assumed that its origins lay somewhere in the Bronze Age, between 1800 and 1500 BCE. Probably this change was contemporary to a transition from the two-aisled to the three-aisled farm as early as 1800 BCE. This development bears comparison with what we know from Scandinavia, where the three-aisled house also develops at the same time.

Within the Northern Bronze Age context, many important reasons are mentioned to the custom of storing cattle inside a building and, moreover, inside the proper house. This could point to a new emphasis on milk production and making cheese, especially since drinking milk was made possible by a gene against lactose intolerance, first to emerge amongst neolithic Northern European populations. Cattle stalling was necessary to avoid cows giving less milk in cold conditions (Sherratt, 1983; Zimermann, 1999, 314; Olausson 1999, 321). Social exchange and a role in the supernatural would have been important as well (Fokkens 1999), supported by, for instance, stacks of cowhides in graves and the offerings of animals attested in both Sweden and Denmark (Rasmussen 1999: 287). Protection against cattle raids would fit the circumstances—proven by grave goods, rock engravings and hoards—of a strong martial ideology in this era (Fokkens 1999).

These complicated cultural-economic networks that preclude precise ethnic (and thus linguistic) differentiation, supports the maintenance of late contacts between the languages ancestral to Germanic and Celtic, assuming a position of Proto-Celtic to the north of the Hallstatt culture – as supported by the known homelands of La Tène culture.

The culture came to an end with the advent of the Hallstatt culture.

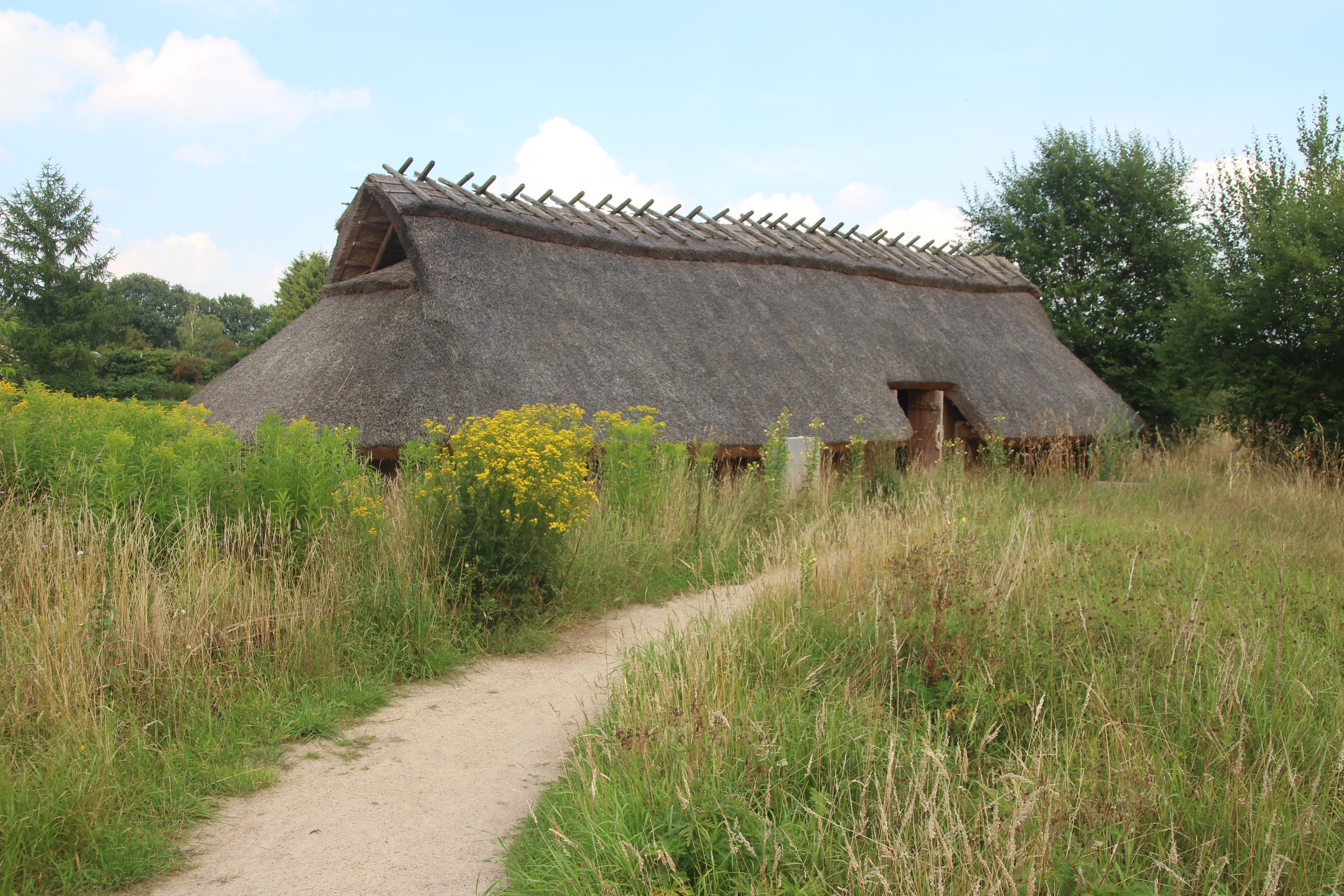
Bronze Age house, reconstruction

== See also ==
- Atlantic Bronze Age
- Urnfield culture
- Jastorf culture
