= Lubieszewo, Gryfice County =

Lubieszewo
- Village
- Location within Poland
- Coordinates: 53°55′N 15°15′E
- Country: Poland
- Voivodeship: West Pomeranian
- County: Gryfice
- Gmina: Gryfice

Lubieszewo [lubjɛˈʂɛvɔ] is a village in the administrative district of Gmina Gryfice, within Gryfice County, West Pomeranian Voivodeship, in north-western Poland. It lies approximately 4 km (2 mi) east of Gryfice and 71 km (44 mi) north-east of the regional capital Szczecin.

A burial site was discovered near the village. This necropolis is dated to the period from the 4th century BCE (Jastorf culture) to the 1st century CE (Gustow group).
