= Prince graves of the Lubieszewo group =

Burial site near Lubieszewo, Poland

The princely graves of the Lubieszewo group refer to a burial site located near the village of Lubieszewo, in Gryfice County, West Pomeranian Voivodeship. This necropolis is dated to the period from the 4th century BCE (Jastorf culture) to the 1st century CE (Gustow group).

The graves of the Lubieszewo group exhibit supra-regional significance. They are found across Central and Northern Europe, characterized by a distinctive funerary rite with shared features and standardized practices unique to this group.

== Archaeological research ==
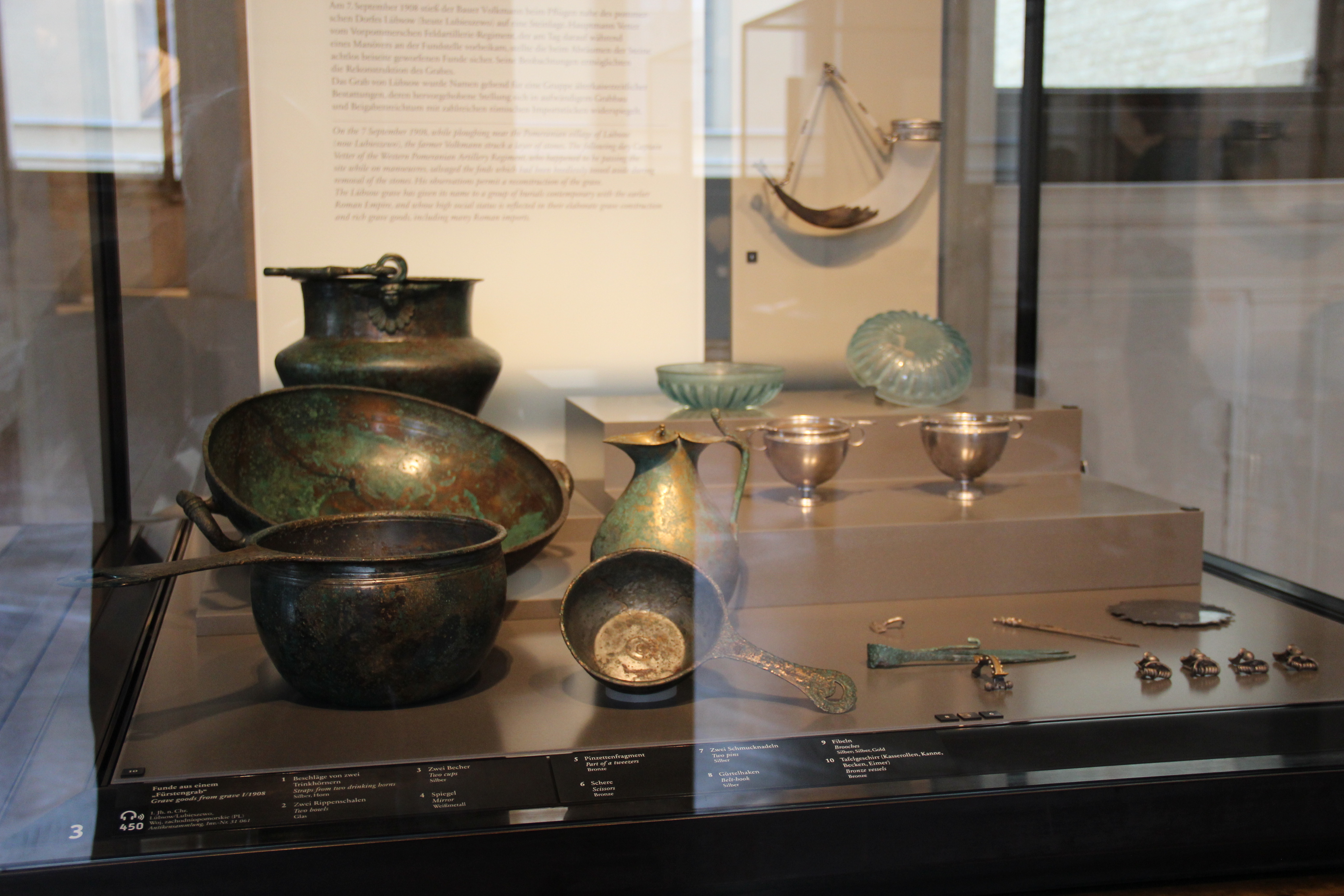
Finds from the Lubieszewo princely graves, 1st century AD

The first archaeological excavations were conducted in Lübsow/Greifenberg in Pommern (modern-day Lubieszewo near Gryfice) between 1908 and 1925 by German archaeologists. Discoveries made between 1937 and 1939 led to the designation of all graves from this period, characterized by shared burial features, as the graves of the Lubieszewo group. The term was coined by Hans Jürgen Eggers, then curator of the Pomeranian State Museum in Szczecin. Further research was carried out under the direction of Ryszard Wołągiewicz between 1964 and 1969, as well as by Adam Cieśliński, Magdalena Nowakowska, and Jan Schuster between 2006 and 2007.

The Lubieszewo burial site comprises three necropolises. Two of them contained over 150 graves, including three kurgans, while the third necropolis consisted of three princely graves located at the Tunnehult forest clearing, believed to belong to an elite class. All graves included pit, urn, and non-urn cremations as well as skeletal burials. The skeletal graves, devoid of weapons or iron tools, were richly equipped. A unifying feature of all kurgans was their uniform construction and similar grave goods, including Roman imports. The mounds measured approximately 20 meters in diameter and about 2 meters in height, and were situated separately from the main cemetery within distinct necropolises. The remaining graves, attributed to the local community, adhered to cremation rites and were devoid of Roman imports, a distinctive characteristic of these burials.

== Archaeological sites in Lubieszewo ==
During the excavations conducted in the 20th century, three distinct archaeological sites were identified in Lubieszewo:

- Site 1: this site contained 142 pit graves, urn graves, and non-urn graves (both individual and collective), along with 5 pit graves according to H. J. Eggers' 1939 research. Additionally, there were two skeletal graves (graves 25 and 26) located at there.
- Site 2: this archaeological site included 5 urn and pit graves (flat graves), as well as 3 skeletal graves (graves with stone mounds – kurgans, excavated between 1908 and 1913). These graves (graves I, II, and III) contained rich grave goods, including Roman imports.
- Site 3: this site contained 3 kurgans (graves 1–3), made from stones, and was found to have rich grave goods, including Roman imports. These mounds were discovered in 1925 and 1938.

== Phases of settlement development ==
The development of the region is divided into six chronological phases:

- Phase I–IV: from the early pre-Roman period to the middle phase of the later pre-Roman period, associated with the Jastorf culture. During this phase, ceramic, bronze, and iron artifacts were developed. This is indicated by excavated hearths with stone structures, refuse and economic pits, which yielded numerous fragments of pottery and metal products. Detailed analysis allowed for the reconstruction of tools and vessel forms.
- Phase V: the younger phase of the pre-Roman period, associated with the Oksywie culture. Its reach extended eastward to the Rega river. A distinctive feature of this period was the continuation of Jastorf traditions by the inhabitants of Lubieszewo, which were not found in other regions of Pomerania.
- Phase VI: the beginning of the Roman period, associated with the Gustow group, which dominated in burial sites west of the Rega river – in the Szczecin Lowland and in the area of Western Pomerania, including the island of Rügen. Settlement in these areas did not encompass earlier periods except in Lubieszewo. This led to the conclusion that an ethnic movement occurred westward from the Rega river, reaching as far as the island of Rügen.

Based on archaeological analysis, it was suggested that the Lubieszewo princes played a significant role in shaping the politics and economy of the region. The contents of the burial inventory provide evidence of extensive contacts and trade exchanges with the Roman Empire (1st century CE). Among the finds were bronze drinking vessels used for wine, as well as several silver, ceramic, and glass cups (depicting gladiator combat scenes) from Southern Europe. Contemporary archaeological studies indicate that the Lubieszewo region had a continuous settlement pattern from the 4th century BCE to the 1st century CE.

The settlement development was influenced by natural conditions and location. The settlement was situated in the Lubieszewo microregion, which is a plateau with an area of 16 km², in the shape of a quadrilateral. The natural boundaries were: the valley of the Rega river to the north and southwest, the Lubieszowa stream to the northeast, and a forest ridge to the southeast. The area of the settlement covered approximately 1.5 ha. The ecumene was rich in water, fertile soil, and forests, which were partly cleared for settlement purposes and livestock grazing.

== Gallery ==
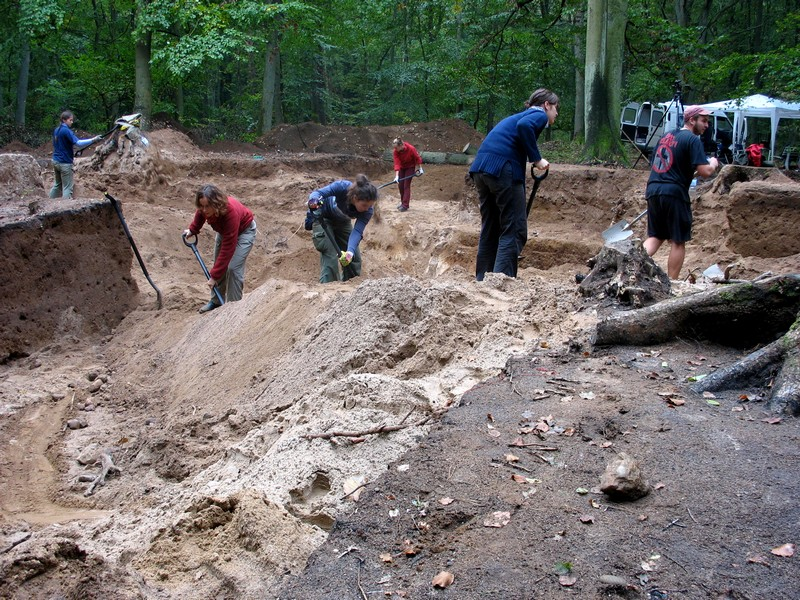
Extent of excavation: site 3, Lubieszewo (2006)

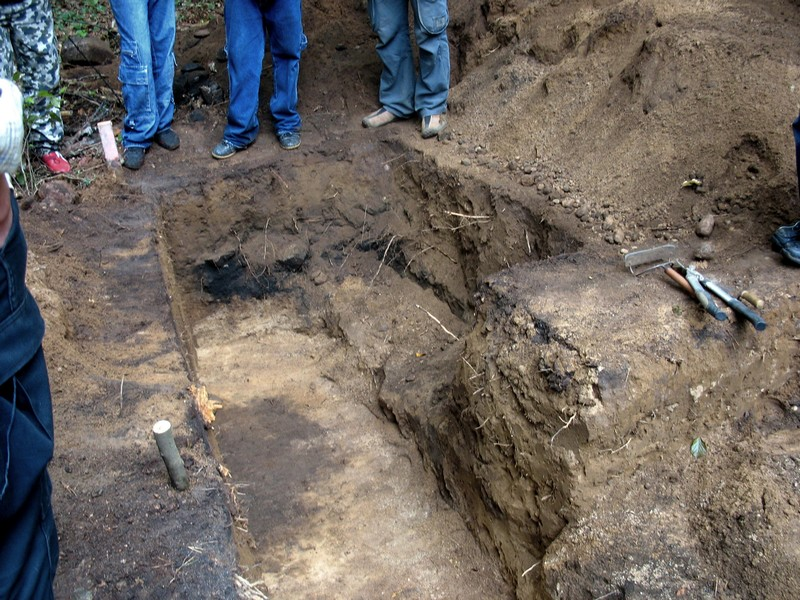
Prince mound No. 1: site 3. Archaeological work in Lubieszewo (2006)

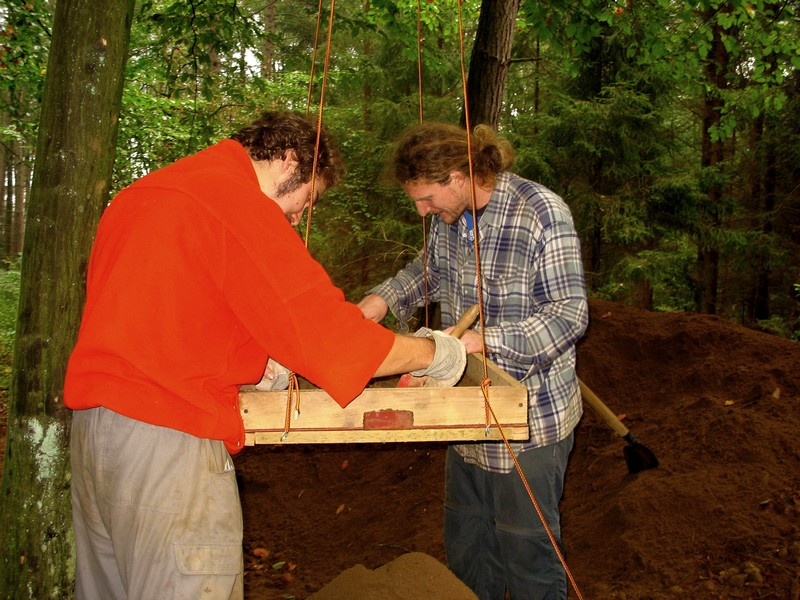
Grave goods recovery: sand sieving at site 3. Lubieszewo (2006)

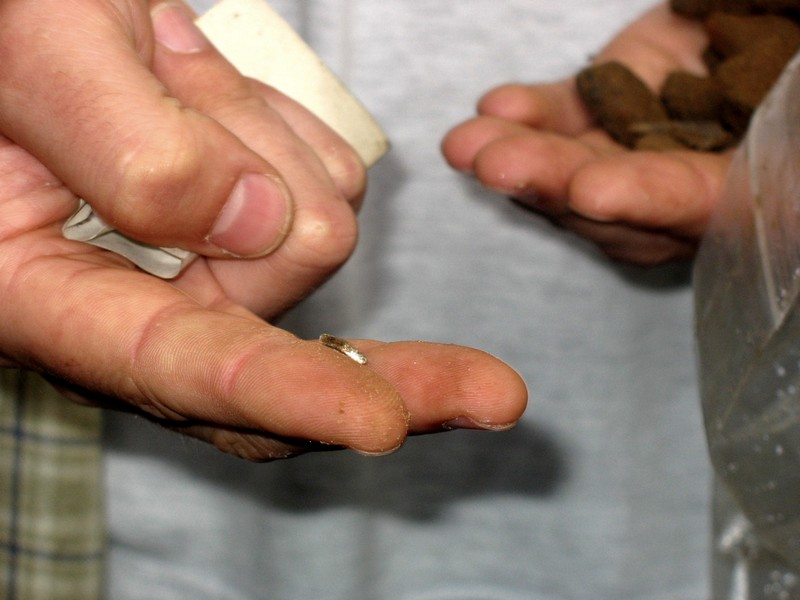
Fragment 1 of the burial inventory excavated at site 3. Lubieszewo (2006)

== Bibliography ==
- Eggers, H. J. (1953). "Lübsow, ein germanischer Fürstensitz der älteren Keiserzeit" [Lübsow: A Germanic Prince’s Seat of the Early Imperial Period]. In Schuchhardt, C. (ed.). Praehistorische Zeitschrift [Prehistoric Journal] (in German).
- Kokowski, Andrzej (2005). Starożytna Polska. Od trzeciego stulecia przed narodzeniem Chrystusa do schyłku starożytności [Ancient Poland: From the Third Century BC to the End of Antiquity] (in Polish). Warsaw: Trio. ISBN 83-7436-012-7.
- Wołągiewicz, Ryszard (1994). Materiały do studiów nad kulturą społeczności Pomorza Zachodniego w okresie od IV w. p.n.e. do I w. n.e. [Materials for Studies on the Culture of Communities in Western Pomerania from the 4th Century BC to the 1st Century AD] (in Polish).
- Wołągiewicz, Ryszard (1971). "Z badań archeologicznych w Lubieszewie nad osadnictwem w późnej starożytności i wczesnym średniowieczu" [From Archaeological Research in Lubieszewo on Settlement in Late Antiquity and the Early Middle Ages]. In Białecki, Tadeusz (ed.). Ziemia Gryficka 1969 [The Land of Gryfice 1969] (in Polish). Szczecin: Gryfickie Towarzystwo Kultury w Gryficach.
