= Gustow group =

Archaeological culture in Europe

The Gustow group (German: Gustow Gruppe or Gustower Gruppe, Polish: grupa gustowska) is an archaeological culture of the Roman Iron Age in Western Pomerania. The Gustow group is associated with the Germanic tribe of the Rugii.

Since the second half of the 1st century AD, settlement in Western Pomerania became more dense. The highest density was reached in the 2nd century. Artefacts, settlements and tombs from this period belong to the coastal group of the Roman Iron Age and are heavily influenced by the material culture of the Oder and Vistula area. Influences from the Elbe area and Scandinavia are found in ceramics artefacts.

Slag from the smelting of iron was found in many settlements, also imported goods, primarily from the Roman provinces, as well as silver and gold. After an archaeological site in Gustow on Rügen, this western Pomeranian culture is referred to as Gustow group. The Gustow group comprised the coastal territories between the Darß peninsula in the West, and the Rega river in the East, while the adjacent Lower Oder area in the South belonged to the related Lebus group. The Gustow group was closely related to the contemporary Elbe cultures.

In the 3rd century, as in all of Pomerania, many settlements were abandoned, and fewer settlement traces are found in the following period. Though rather scarce, Gustow group settlements were located on better soil due to the increasing importance of plant cultivation.

== See also ==
- Early history of Pomerania
- Pomerania
- Migration period
