= Lemovii =

Ancient Germanic tribe

Map of the Roman Empire and contemporary indigenous Europe in AD 125, showing the location of the Rugii, who lived in the proximity of the Lemovii.

The Lemovii were a Germanic tribe, only once named by Tacitus in the late 1st century. He noted that they lived near the Rugii and both lived east of the Gutones, who are lived in the delta of the Vistula river. All three of these peoples fought in combat with short swords and round shields.

The Oksywie culture is associated with parts of the Rugii and Lemovii. Also, the Plöwen group (German: Plöwener Gruppe) of the Uecker-Randow region is associated with the Lemovii.

The archaeological Dębczyn group might comprise the remnants of the Lemovii, probably identical with Widsith's Glommas, who are believed to have been the neighbors of the Rugii, a tribe dwelling at the Baltic Sea coast in today's Pomerania region before the migration period. Both "Lemovii" and "Glommas" translate to "the barking". Germanic sagas report a battle on the isle of Hiddensee between king Hetel (Hethin, Heodin of the Glommas) and Rugian king Hagen, following the abduction of Hagen's daughter Hilde by Hetel. Yet, there are also other hypotheses about the location of the Lemovii, and that their identification as Glommas, though probable, is not certain.

The Lemovii have also been equated with Jordanes' Turcilingi, together with the Rugii with Ptolemy's Rhoutikleioi, also with Ptolemy's Leuonoi and with the Leonas of the Widsith.

== See also ==
- Rugii
- Oxhöft culture
- Dębczyn group
- Early history of Pomerania
- List of ancient Germanic peoples
