= Dobberworth =

Archaeological site in Germany

Coordinates: 54°31′11″N 13°32′50″E

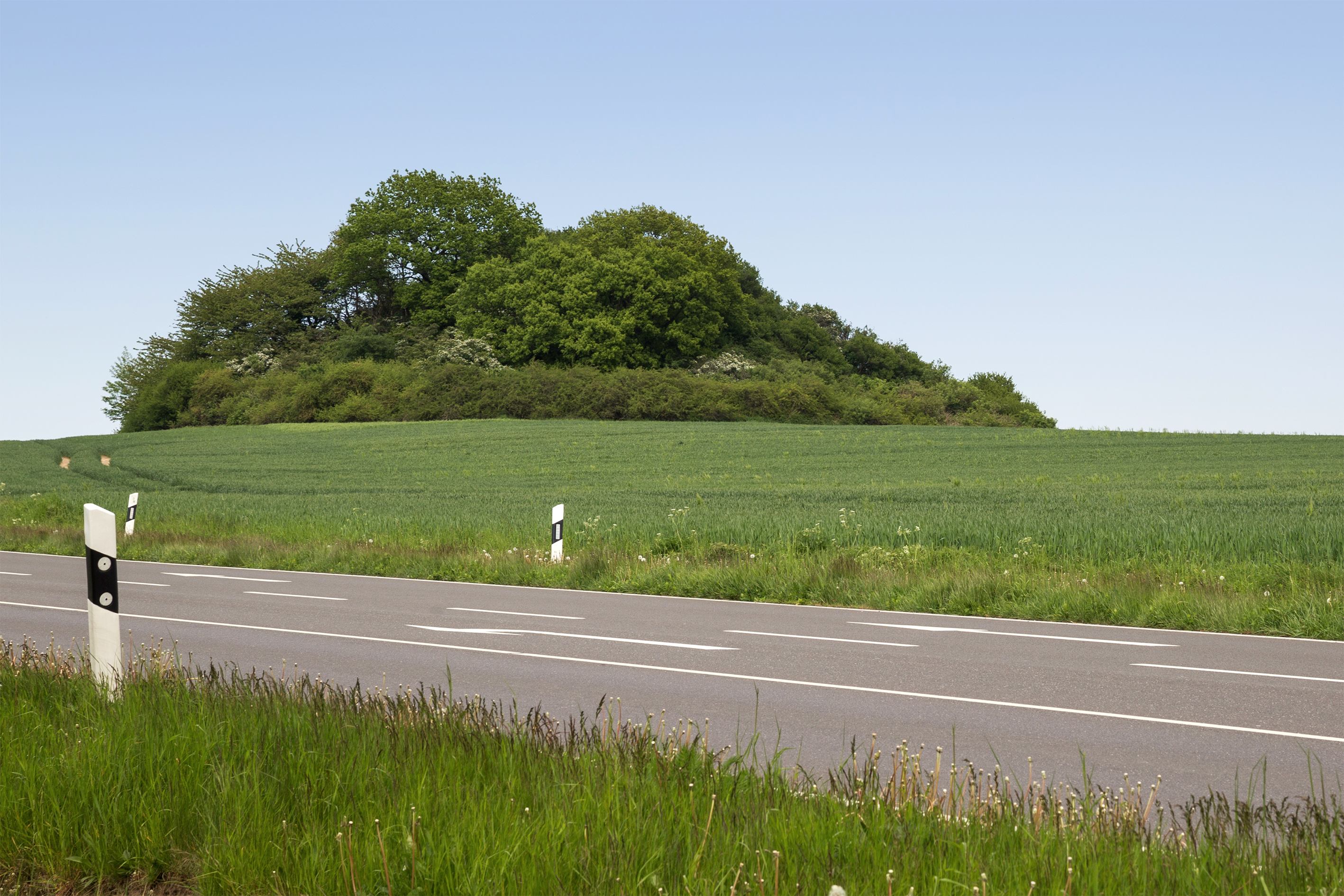
Dobberworth from southwest.

The Dobberworth or Dubberworth is one of the largest prehistoric tumuli (Hügelgrab) in northern Germany, located on the isle of Rügen near Sagard.

== Description ==
The Dubberworth is about 15 metres (49 ft) tall, and was made from an estimated 22,000 cubic metres (29,000 cu yd) of earth, making it the largest tumulus in Rügen. Archaeologists have not been able to date the tumulus precisely, but assume it was used during the Bronze Age. The etymology of the name is also uncertain, as "-worth" is linked to an old designation for an "elevated estate" ("Worte", "Wurt").

== Legends ==
According to local legends, the Dubberworth was made by a giant who intended to fill a narrow ford linking two nearby Bodden and lost the clay on their way. In one legend, the giant was a female on her way to exact revenge on a prince of Rügen who did not love her back, in another legend it was male giant Scharmak on his way to his girlfriend. A further legend tells about dwarven dwellers and large amounts of gold inside the hill.

== See also ==
- Early history of Pomerania
