= Early history of Pomerania =

After the glaciers of the Ice Age in the Early Stone Age withdrew from the area, which since about 1000 AD is called Pomerania, in what are now northern Poland and north-eastern Germany, they left a tundra. First humans appeared, hunting reindeer in the summer. A climate change in 8000 BC allowed hunters and foragers of the Ertebølle-Ellerbek culture to continuously inhabit the area. These people became influenced by farmers of the Linear Pottery culture who settled in southern Pomerania. The hunters of the Ertebølle-Ellerbek culture became farmers of the Funnelbeaker culture in 3000 BC. The Havelland culture dominated in the Uckermark from 2500 to 2000 BC. In 2400 BC, the Corded Ware culture reached Pomerania and introduced the domestic horse. Both Linear Pottery and Corded Ware culture have been associated with Indo-Europeans. Except for Western Pomerania, the Funnelbeaker culture was replaced by the Globular Amphora culture a thousand years later.

During the Bronze Age, Western Pomerania was part of the Nordic Bronze Age cultures, while east of the Oder river the Lusatian culture dominated. Throughout the Iron Age, the people of the western Pomeranian areas belonged to the Jastorf culture, while the Lusatian culture of the East was succeeded by the Pomeranian culture, then in 150 BC by the Oksywie culture, and at the beginning of the first millennium by the Wielbark culture.

While the Jastorf culture is usually associated with Germanic peoples, the ethnic category of the Lusatian culture and its successors is debated. Veneti, Germanic peoples like Goths, Rugians, and Gepids, and Slavs are assumed to have been the bearers of these cultures or parts thereof.

From the 3rd century onwards, many settlements were abandoned, marking the beginning of the migration period in Pomerania. It is assumed that Burgundians, Goths and Gepids with parts of the Rugians left Pomerania during that stage, while some Veneti, Vidivarii and other, Germanic groups remained, and formed the Gustow, Debczyn and late Wielbark cultures, which existed in Pomerania until the 6th century.

The name Pomerania comes from Slavic po more, which means "[land] by the sea".

== Ice Age and Paleolithic (Early Stone) Age (before 8000 BC) ==
20,000 years ago the territory of present-day Pomerania was covered with ice, which did not start to recede until the late period of the Old Stone Age or Paleolithic some 13,000 years BC, when the Scandinavian glacier receded northwards (Allerød oscillation). At the site of the later Baltic Sea was the cold, saline Yoldia Sea (~11,500-9500 BC), which was succeeded by the fresh water Ancylus Lake (9500-8000 BC).

=== Hamburgian ===
Hamburgian reindeer hunters were the first humans to occupy the plains freed from the retreating glaciers in north-central Europe. However, whether they also roamed Pomerania is uncertain: though there are finds in neighboring regions of Denmark, Mecklenburg and Poland, there are no finds from Pomerania which can be associated to the Hamburgian techno-complex without doubt. Though finds resembling Hamburgian typology were made in Tanowo, these finds likely stem from a later era.

=== Federmesser, Bromme ===
The Federmesser and related Bromme techno-complexes are archaeologically traceable in Pomerania, but finds are sparse. That may be due to Pomerania's location within the fall-out zone of the Laacher See eruption, which in 10970 BC covered the area with a tephra layer and is probably responsible for the emergence of the Bromme techno-complex from the Federmesser one by separating it from the southern groups. A worked giant deer antler and a sharpened horse rib from the Endingen IV Federmesser site were ^{14}C-dated to 11555 ±100 BP and 11830 ±50 BP, respectively, and together with a giant deer skull from Mecklenburg represent the oldest absolutely dated human traces in northeastern Germany.

== Mesolithic (Middle Stone) Age (8000 - 3000 BC) ==
About 8000 BC, the climate started to change, and the former subarctic tundra was transformed into woodlands.

About 7,500 years ago, the Litorina Sea, a predecessor of the Baltic Sea evolved, with its southern coastline being close to the current one.

=== Maglemosian culture ===
The Paleolithic Ahrensburg culture was succeeded by the early Mesolithic Maglemosian culture (8000-6000 BC), whose members were not only hunters, but also foragers and fishermen. According to their tools, they are grouped as first belonging to the Komornica (east) and Duvensee culture (west), later to the Chojnice-Pienki culture (east). They settled the dunes and used flint stone microliths.

=== Ertebølle-Ellerbek-Lietzow culture ===
Flintstone tools of hunters and foragers from the Mesolithic Age were found at various sites. Most of the artefacts date back to the late Mesolithic Age (since 5500 BC). They belong to the Ertebølle-Ellerbek culture (Lietzow subgroup), a culture that settled the coastline and already used ceramics.

While primarily hunters, it is assumed that the Mesolithic people were also foraging, fishing, and even farming on a most primitive scale. They also knew how to build dugout canoes, such as the Stralsund dugouts, and with these they travelled down the rivers into the hinterlands. The starting point for these expeditions often was Rügen.

== Neolithic (Late Stone) Age (3000 -1900 BC) ==
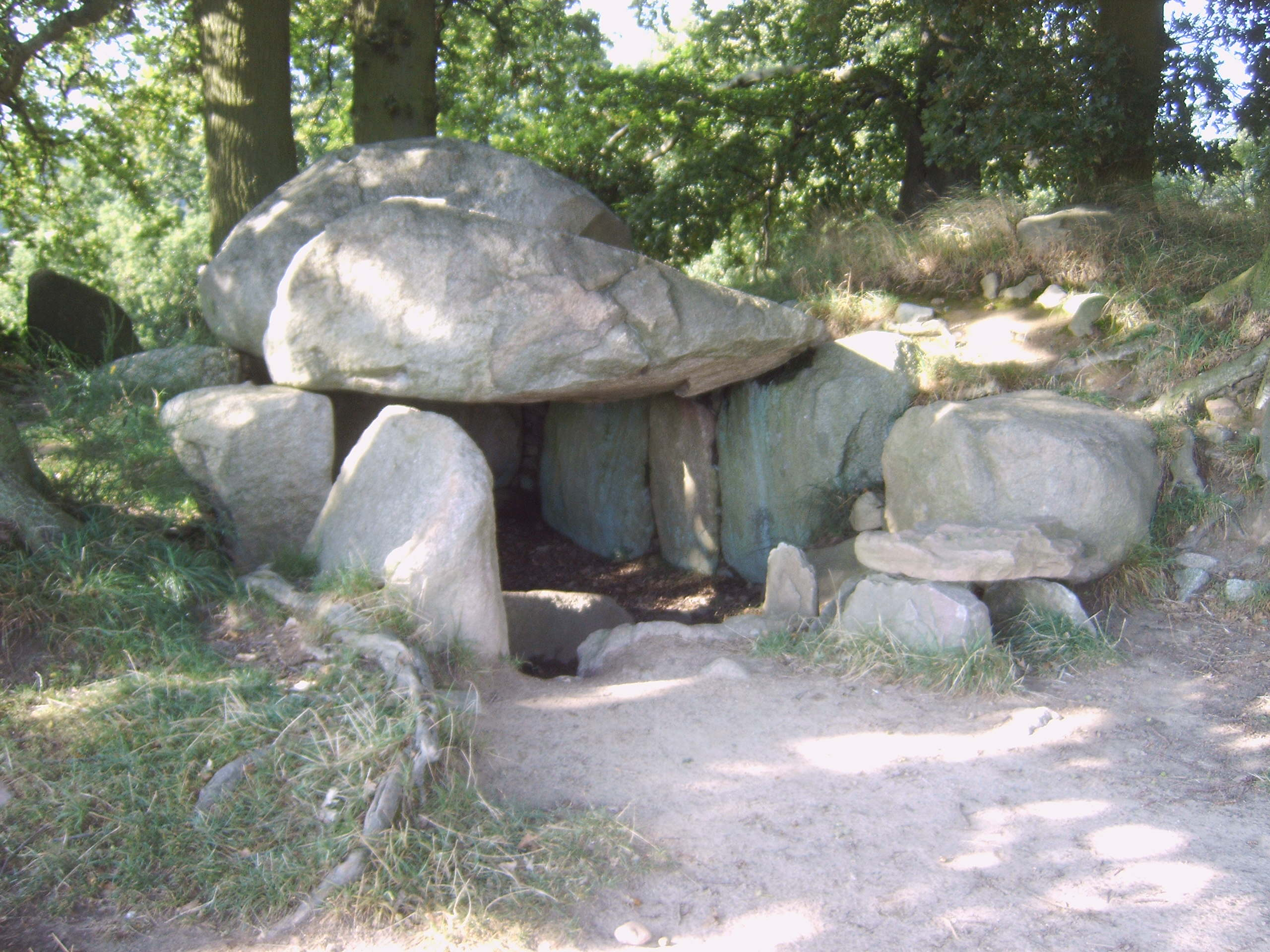
Dolmen in Lancken-Granitz (Rügen), used ~3500 BC - ~1000 BC

=== Linear Pottery culture ===
The move from Middle to Late Stone Age (Mesolithic to Neolithic Age) is marked by the change in the way of life from hunting and foraging to farming and livestock breeding. This was not a sudden change, but took place over a long period. The people of the Ertebølle culture were thereby inspired by the Middle German Linear Pottery culture, whose northernmost frontier was southern Pomerania (Uckermark and the Pyrzyce area).

=== Funnelbeaker culture ===
From 3000 to 1900 BC Pomerania was settled by farmers and herders of the Funnelbeaker culture (also TRB, Trichterbecher culture), that had evolved from the previous Mesolithic cultures and Linear Pottery culture influence. During this period, Western Pomerania was more densely settled than before, primarily on smooth hills near the water. Artefacts and settlements from this periods have been found at various sites in Western Pomerania, e.g. around the Bay of Greifswald. The Funnelbeaker culture people erected numerous Megalith tombs.

=== Havelland culture ===
From 2500 to 2000 BC, the Uckermark was not influenced by the Funnelbeaker culture, but by the Havelland culture, representing the northernmost area of this culture that was centered around the middle Elbe and Havel rivers. The Bay of Greifswald, Usedom and Uecker-Randow areas were under a weak influence of this culture also.

=== Corded Ware culture ===
Corded Ware horizon (~2500 BC)

About 2400 BC, people of the Corded Ware culture reached Pomerania. They probably originated in the Black Sea area and introduced the domestic horse. While the Corded Ware people have been associated with the first Indo-Europeans, recently the earlier Linear Pottery Culture is said to be Indo-European, too.

While most of Pomerania was part of or influenced by the Single Grave culture subgroup, eastern Pomerelia belonged to the Rzucewo (also Bay Coast or Haffküsten) culture subgroup stretching from Pomerelia to Lithuania, formerly associated with early Balts.

The impact of the late neolithic Corded Ware culture on Western Pomerania was not as strong, but traceable. For example, both Funnelbeaker and Corded Ware culture artefacts were found in a Megalith tomb near Groß Zastrow.

=== Globular Amphora culture ===
The Globular Amphora culture replaced the Funnelbeaker culture in most of Pomerania a thousand years later, but no artefacts have been found in Western Pomerania. This culture is associated with amber trade.

=== Comb Ceramic culture ===
During the mid-Neolithic Age, small populations belonging to the Comb Ceramic or Pit-comb ware culture were traced in Pomerania.

== Bronze Age (1900 - 550 BC) ==
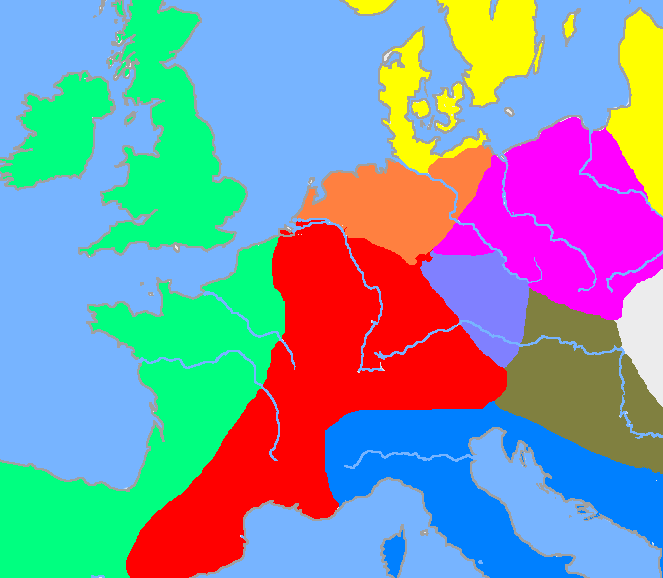
Bronze Age cultures (1200 BC): Urnfield culture (red), Lusatian culture (purple), Nordic Bronze Age (yellow)

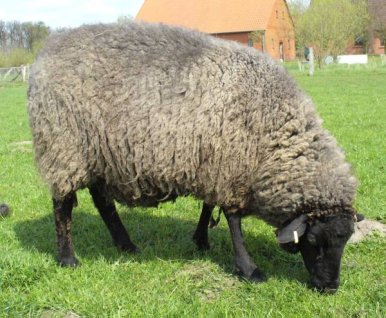
Pomeranian Coarsewool Sheep, traced back some 3,000 years.

=== Nordic Bronze Age (Western Pomerania) ===
While the Bronze Age began in Southern Germany before 1800 BC and had reached the Elbe and Saale area by 1550 BC, the North was still dominated by the Neolithic Funnelbeaker culture and Corded Ware culture (Single Grave culture). Only isolated artefacts belonging to the early Bronze Age have been found in Western Pomerania. The early Bronze Age cultures in Western Pomerania are classified as Buchholz group (Plonia group).

From the Late Bronze Age, various settlements and artefacts were found in Western Pomerania. These later Bronze Age culters (periods II and III) are classified as Westpomeranian group (also Wusterwitz or Ostrowice group), and associated with the Grubengrab culture. In this period, settlement became more stable.

=== Early Bronze Age in Eastern Pomerania ===
During the early Bronze Age, the eastern and the southeastern parts of Pomerania were not as densely settled as the western parts. The local cultures were influenced by Iwno culture, later Trzciniec culture. Based on linguistic analyses of toponymes, Marija Gimbutas and others proposed a culture of Pomeranian Balts from the mouth of the Oder, and the whole Vistula basin to Silesia in the South-West.

=== Lusatian Culture (Eastern Pomerania) ===
During the late Bronze Age (1200 BC), Farther Pomerania and Pomerelia were under the influence of the Lusatian culture, the north-eastern subgroup of the Urnfield culture. People of this culture burned their dead and buried the ashes in urns, which were typically placed in urnfields but also in tumuli. The Pomeranian variant of the Lusatian culture can further be divided into an eastern and the Göritz group. The sun is assumed to have played a prominent role in their religion, which also included cannibalism. Numerous archeological findings of imported Scandinavian products prove contacts to Nordic Bronze Age peoples.

These contacts and the Scandinavian influence on Pomerania was so considerable that this region is sometimes included in the Nordic Bronze Age culture. The local Lusatian cultures were also influenced by the west-alpine and Hallstatt cultures. Metalworks technologies were imported from the South via the Oder river. The eastern or Kashubian group of the Pomeranian Lusatian culture, characterized by burial rites were burned ashes were placed in burial mounds with stone constructions, imported their metalworks technologies from the South via the Vistula river as well as from the North via the Baltic Sea.

The people of the Lusatian Culture lived either in unfortified villages or in fortified strongholds. The number of such strongholds rapidly increased at about 700 BC for unknown reasons. Towards and during the Iron Age, an increasing wealth is recorded.

There was a dispute between German and Polish historians concerning the ethnicity of the Lusatian Culture people. This dispute had reached its climax in the interbellum and also after World War II. Recent studies conclude a multi-ethnic character, prominently including the Veneti, but also Germanic peoples in the Northwest and Slavic peoples in the East.

== Pre-Roman Iron Age ==
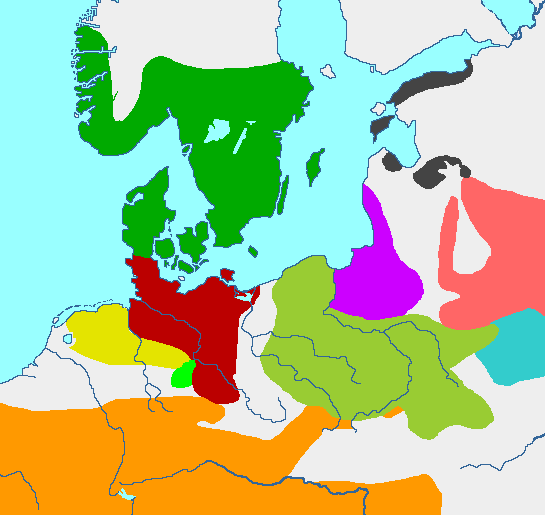
Early Iron Age: Jastorf culture (dark red), Pomeranian culture (olive-green)

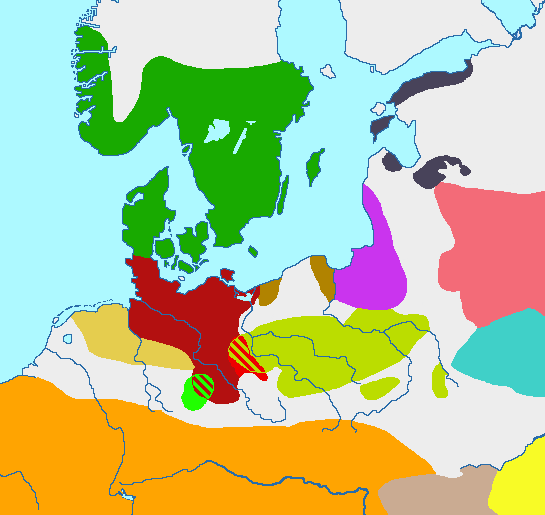
Late Iron Age: Jastorf culture (red) and Oksywie culture (brown)

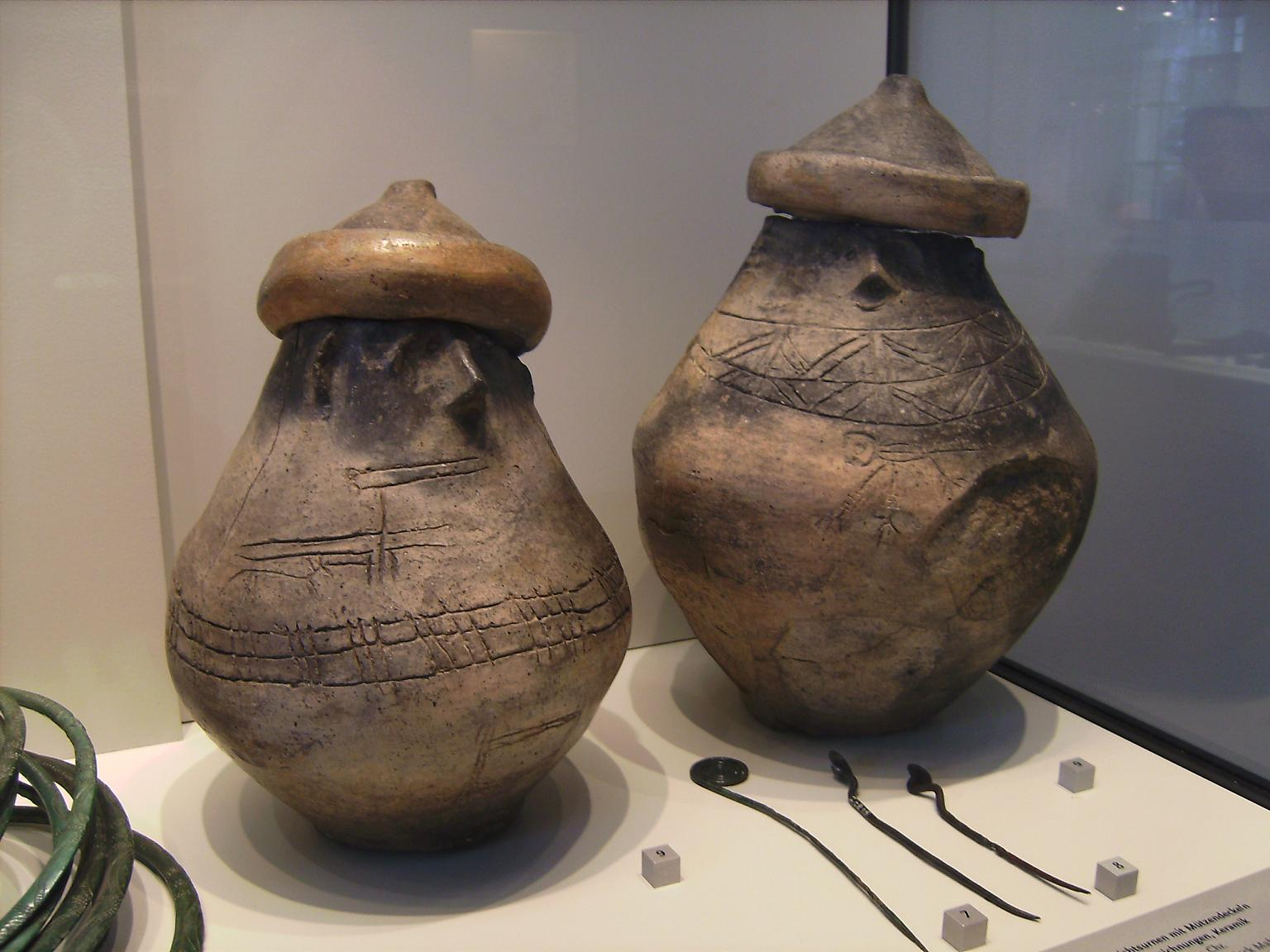
Pomerelian faced urns

=== Jastorf culture (Western Pomerania, 550 - 50 BC) ===
During the Iron Age, Western Pomerania belonged to the Jastorf culture (550-50 BC). As before during the Bronze Age, the dead were burned and the ashes buried in urns. Settlements and urn grave fields with artefacts were found e.g. in the then densely settled Greifswald area.

The Jastorf culture is associated with early Germanic peoples. Western Pomerania belonged to the Warnow-Oder estituary subgroup of the Jastorf culture, the easternmost group is designated Oder group. The Oder group, formerly thought to have emerged after an immigration from Bornholm, is now thought to have evolved from a local population formerly belonging to the Pomeranian culture and the Göritz group of the Lusatian culture, who first adapted to new habits and later mingled with a Germanic population from the West.

=== Pomeranian culture (Eastern Pomerania, 650 - 150 BC) ===
The Pomeranian culture evolved from the Lusatian culture east of the Parseta river and in Pomerelia. It is characterized primarily by the use of faced urns, also of house urns, placed in stone cists.

This culture is considered to mark the (proto-)Germanic-Baltic frontier. A linguistic classification, whether Baltic, Germanic, or interlink, is not possible. Earlier, the Pomeranian culture was associated with the Bastarnae, yet today the culture is considered to have evolved from the local Lusatian culture tribes.

=== Oksywie culture (Eastern Pomerania, 150 BC - 1 AD) ===
The Oksywie culture existed in the area of Farther Pomerania and Pomerelia around the lower Vistula river, from the 2nd century BC to the early 1st century AD. The culture is named after the village Oksywie (today part of the city of Gdynia), where the first artifacts typical of this culture were discovered.

== Roman Iron Age and Migration period ==
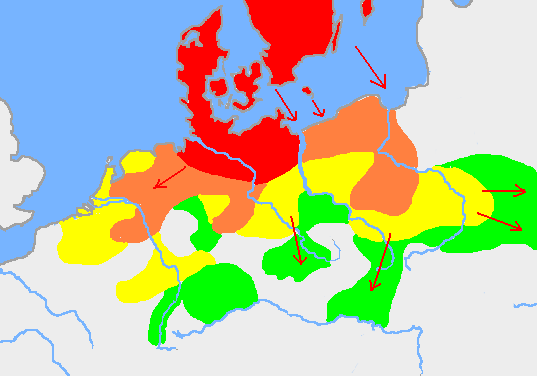
Germanic tribes before 750 BC 500 BC 250 BC AD 1

=== Gustow group, Western Pomerania ===
Since the second half of the 1st century AD, settlement in Western Pomerania became more dense. The highest density was reached in the 2nd century. Artefacts, settlements and tombs from this period belong to the coastal group of the Roman Iron Age and are heavily influenced by the material culture of the Oder and Vistula area. Influences from the Elbe area and Scandinavia are found in ceramics artefacts.

Slag from the smelting of iron was found in many settlements, also imported goods, primarily from the Roman provinces, as well as silver and gold. After an archaeological site in Gustow on Rügen, this western Pomeranian culture is referred to as Gustow group. The Gustrow group comprised the coastal territories between the Darß peninsula in the West, and the Rega river in the East, while the adjacent Lower Oder area in the South belonged to the related Lebus group. The Gustow group was closely related to the contemporary Elbe cultures.

In the 3rd century, as in all of Pomerania, many settlements were abandoned, and fewer settlement traces are found in the following period. Though rather scarce, Gustow group settlements were located on better soil due to the increasing importance of plant cultivation.

=== Wielbark (Willenberg) Culture (Eastern Pomerania, 1 - 450 AD) ===
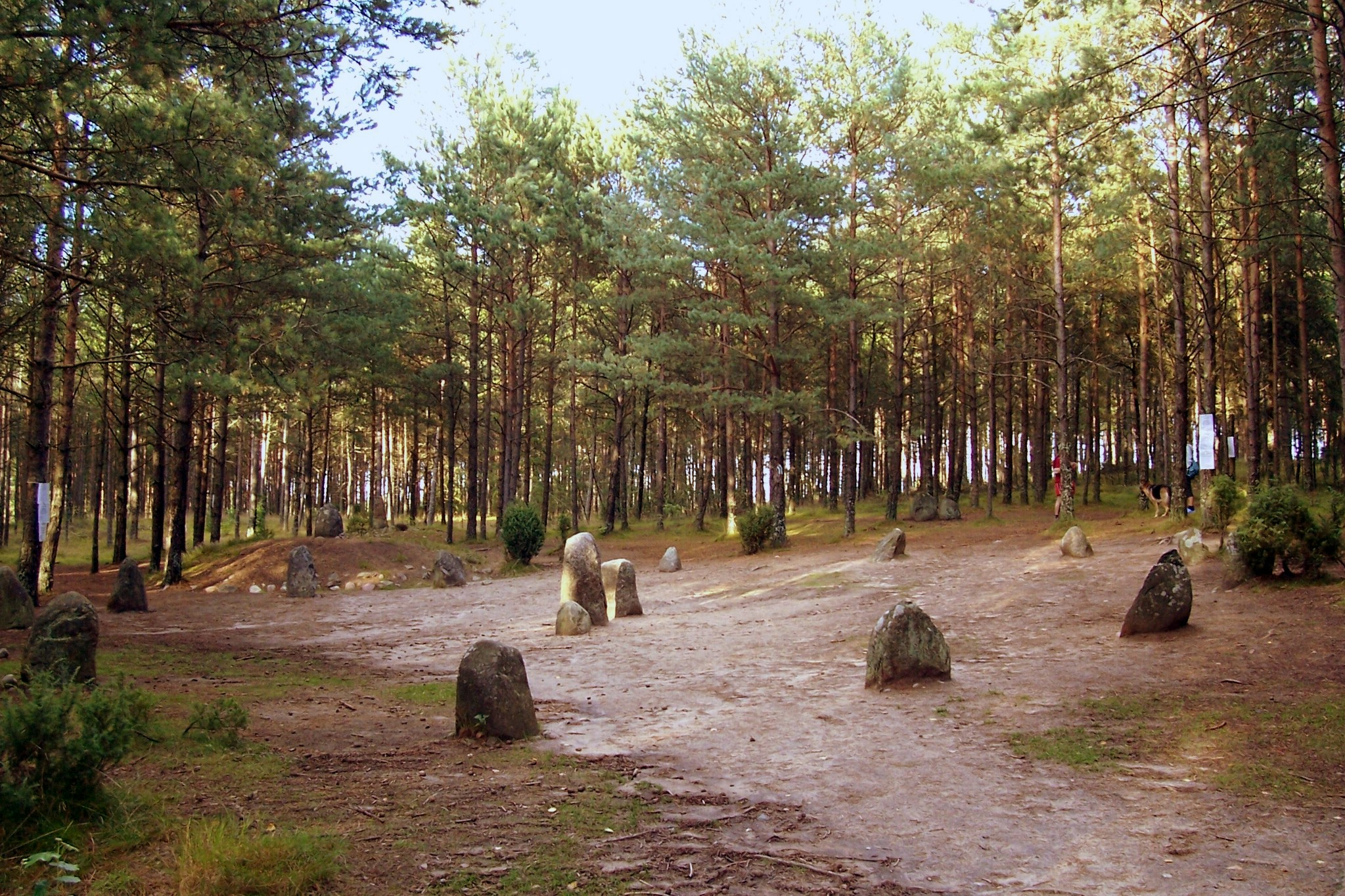
Stone circle of the Wielbark culture in Wesiory

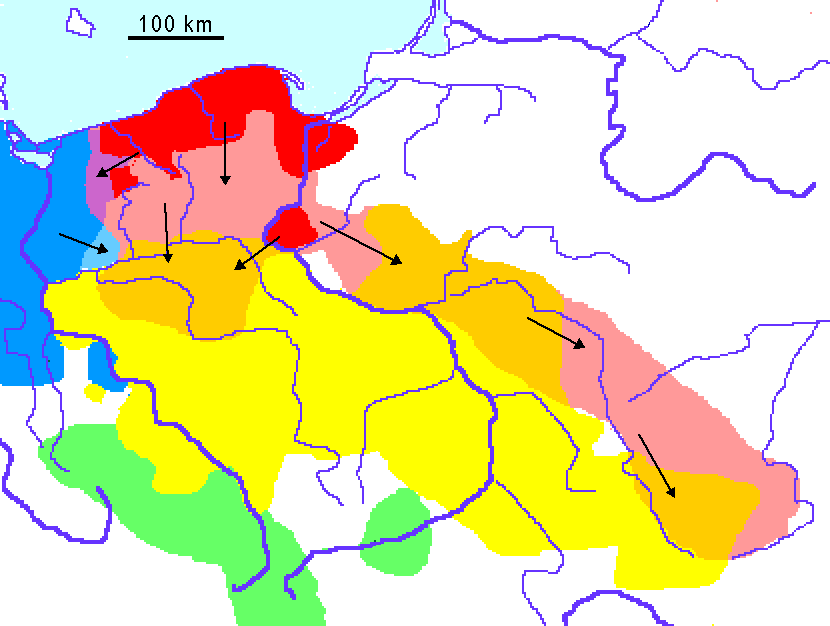
Expansion of the Wielbark (red, flesh, orange and purple)

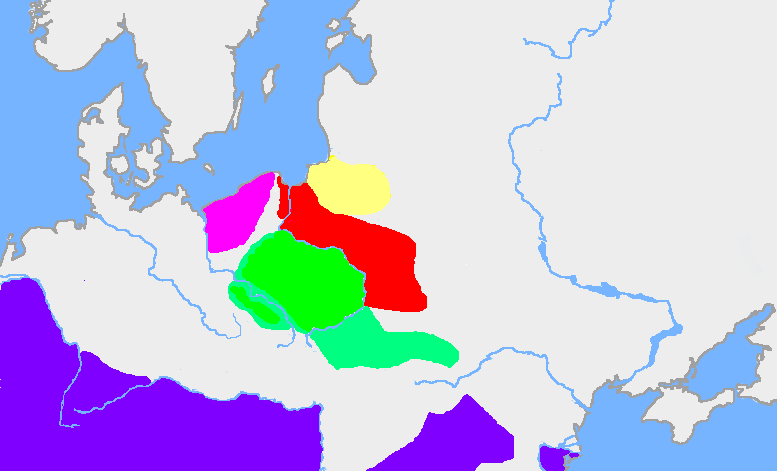
Willenberg culture (red) and Debczyn culture (pink), late 3rd century

The Willenberg or Wielbark culture appeared during the first half of the 1st century AD and replaced the Oksywie culture. This culture dominated the area of Farther Pomerania northeast of the Ina river, most of Pomerelia and northern Mazovia.

The ethnic background of the Wielbark people is not certain. While in the past, German and Polish historians had associated them with the Goths or Slavs, respectively, recent hypotheses suggest they were a heterogeneous people, though scholarship is divided on whom to include therein; suggestions include the Veleti, Germanic peoples (Goths, Rugians, and Gepids) and possibly Slavs.

From this period, many influences are recorded from the Roman Empire. Coins were in use abundantly. Imported Roman goods and their native imitations, though poorer in quality, were common. Roman luxury goods were also found, but those were most probably reserved for the elite. Besides the import of Roman goods, the society also to a lesser degree copied the social differentiation of the Romans. Many princely graves are known from this period.

Between 170 and 260 AD, settlement in Pomerania became less dense. The Wielbark culture continued to exist in the Oder and Vistula estuaries, in parallel to and under mutual influence of the Dębczyn culture that evolved in its midst. Numerous imported goods found from this period in the Oder estuary, originating in the Black Sea area, the Roman provinces, and Scandinavia underline the contemporary importance of the Oder estuary.

=== Dębczyn culture (250-525 AD) ===
In the second half of the 3rd century, the Dębczyn culture (or group) succeeded the Wielbark culture between the Parsęta and Drawa rivers, and a local, not yet classified culture between the lower Oder and Parsęta rivers. The adjacent areas to the east were uninhabited by this time. Whether the eastern Dębczyn culture replaced or evolved from the Wielbark culture is not yet known, in the western areas, settlement was continuous. The emergence of this group is characterized by an influence of the Vistula region (Wielbark culture), the expansion of the Gustow group, and many parallels to the Elbe Germanic areas. The dead were buried unburned. The culture existed until the first quarter of the 6th century, when burial of the dead in grave fields stopped.

The Dębczyn group might comprise the archaeological remnants of Tacitus' Lemovii, probably identical with Widsith's Glommas, who are believed to have been the neighbors of the Rugians, a tribe dwelling at the Pomeranian coast before the migration period. Germanic sagas report a battle on the isle of Hiddensee between King Hetel (Hethin, Heodin of the Glommas) and Rugian king Hagen, following the abduction of Hagen's daughter Hilde by Hetel. Yet, there are also other hypotheses about the location of the Lemovii, and that their identification as Glommas, though probable, is not certain.

=== 5th and 6th centuries ===
Since the mid-5th century, the dead were not buried on grave fields anymore. Also, hoards of fibulae have been found from this period, especially of the Sösdala and Sjörup type. From the second half of the 5th century and the beginning 6th century, treasures of late Roman solidi, bracteates, and golden jewelry are found. From the same period these treasures were hidden, both hoards of and single solidi have been found, coined by Valentinian III (425-455) and Anastasius I (491-518). These were found in the Debczin group area, the Vistula area, where they are associated with the Vidivarian stage of the Willenberg culture, and in the Oder estituary, where they were found together with jewelry. Some of these hoards might have served as a substitute for burial objects, others might have been buried for some mythological purpose.

In the late 5th and early 6th centuries, large grave fields were set up in the coastal areas, which differ from the Debzcyn group type and show Scandinavian analogies. Findings include fibulae of the Bornholm type, needles with bird heads, and armour (shields, lances and swords) of western European and Scandinavian type.

It is assumed that Burgundians, Goths and Gepids with parts of the Rugians left Pomerania during the late Roman Age, and that during the migration period, remnants of Rugians, Vistula Veneti, Vidivarii and other, Germanic tribes remained and formed units that were later Slavicized. The Vidivarii themselves are described by Jordanes in his Getica as a melting pot of tribes who in the mid-6th century lived at the lower Vistula. Though differing from the earlier Willenberg culture, some traditions were continued. One hypothesis, based on the sudden appearance of large amounts of Roman solidi and migrations of other groups after the breakdown of the Hun empire in 453, suggest a partial re-migration of earlier emigrants to their former northern homelands.
