= Dębczyn culture =

Pomeranian archaeological culture

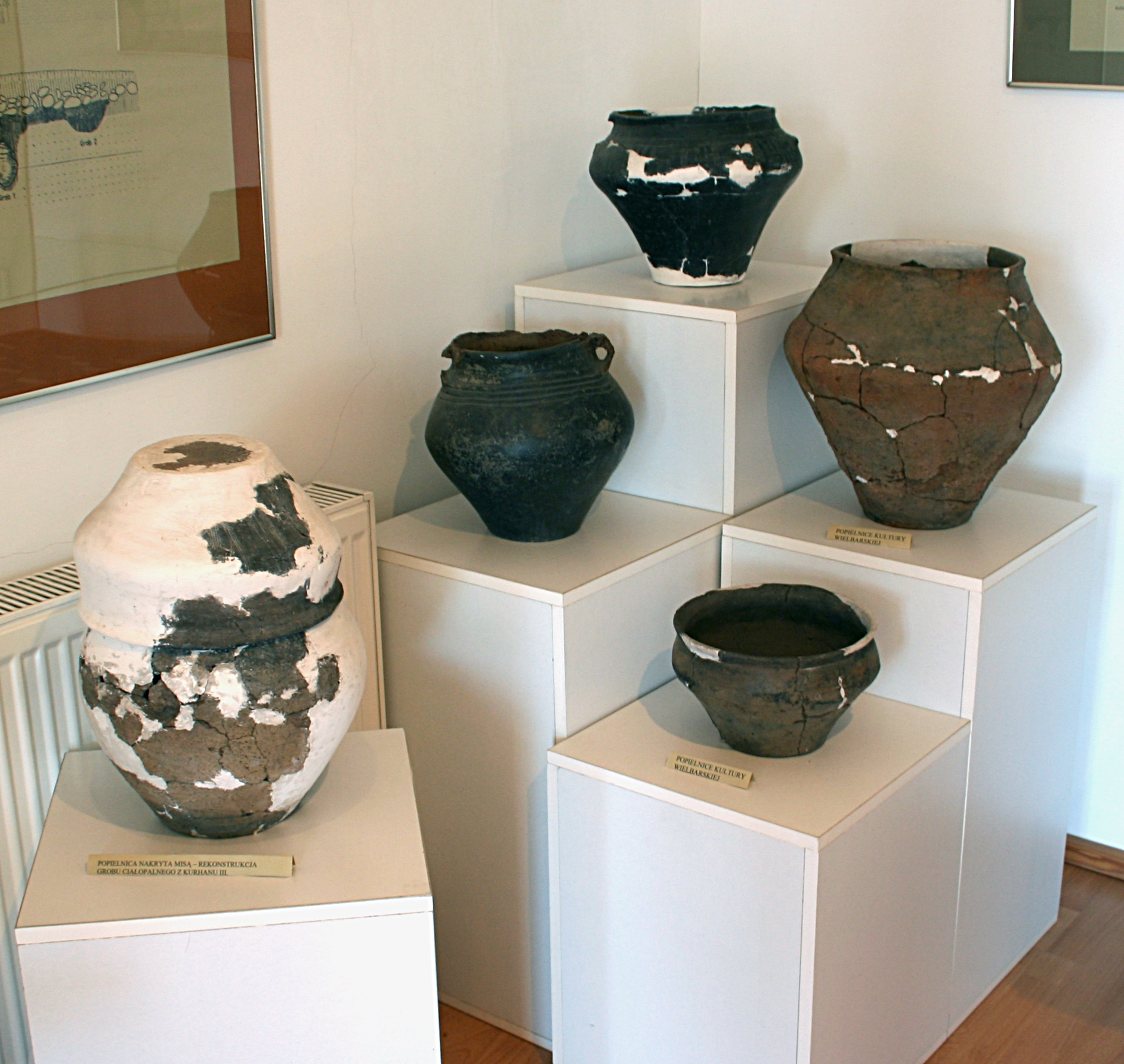
Wielbark culture ceramic vessels. Museum of History and Ethnography in Chojnice, Poland

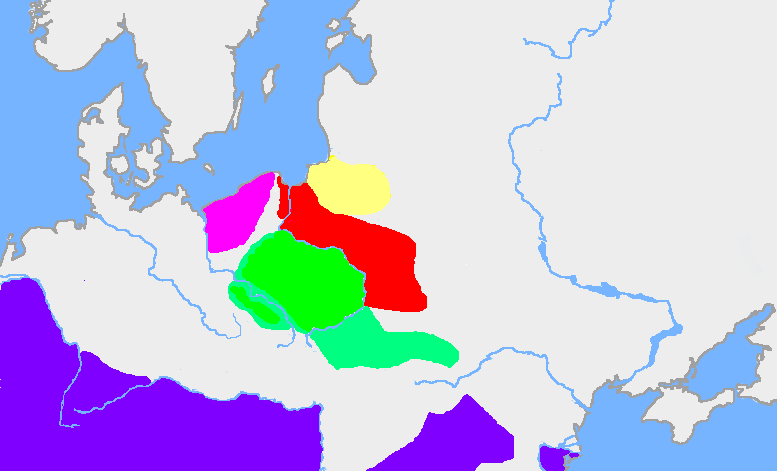
The pink area is the Debczyn culture; the red area is the extent of the Wielbark culture in the first half of the third century. The green area is the Przeworsk culture, and the yellow area is a Baltic culture (possibly the Aesti). The purple area is the Roman Empire

The Dębczyn culture (Dębczyno, in German also Denziner) is an archaeological culture in Pomerania from the third to sixth centuries. It was derived from the neighboring Wielbark culture with influences from the Elbe region. The culture was superseded as the result of the later migrations of West Slavs, in particular of the Pomeranians (Slavic tribe).

== Origins ==
"Dębczyno group" was defined in archaeological literature at the beginning of the 1980s. In the second half of the third century, this culture succeeded the Wielbark culture between the Persante and Drage rivers.

Whether the eastern Dębczyn culture replaced or evolved from the Wielbark culture is not yet known, in the western areas, settlement was continuous. The emergence of this group is characterized by an influence of the Vistula region (Wielbark culture), the expansion of the Gustow group, and many parallels to the Elbe Germanic areas.

Also the Lebuser (Lubusz) cultural group preceded Debczyn culture. This group was isolated in 1975 by A. Leube.

The northern European cultural elements are also present. Contact was made with the north European population, especially that of the Danish Bornholm island.

The dead were buried unburned. The culture existed until the first quarter of the sixth century, when burial of the dead in grave fields stopped.

== Identification ==
The Dębczyn group might comprise the archaeological remnants of Tacitus' Lemovii, probably identical with the Glommas, a tribe mentioned in the Old English poem Widsith, which may be connected to the area of the river Glomma in Norway. These are believed to have been the neighbors of the Rugians, a tribe dwelling at the Pomeranian coast before the migration period.

Germanic sagas report a battle on the isle of Hiddensee between king Hetel (Hethin, Heodin of the Glommas) and Rugian king Hagen, following the abduction of Hagen's daughter Hilde by Hetel. Yet, there are also other hypotheses about the location of the Lemovii, and that their identification as Glommas, though probable, is not certain.

Other scholars also identify this culture with the Rugii and the Veneti.

Cultural connections with the Danubian region have been identified.

After the departure of some of the Rugii together with the Goths, Gepids and others, the remaining Rugii, Veneti, Vidivarii, as well as some other Germanic peoples, were subject to Slavicisation from the seventh century onward.

== See also ==
- Vends (Livonia)
- Early history of Pomerania
- Poland in antiquity
- Goths
- Wielbark culture
