= Lancken-Granitz =

- Municipality
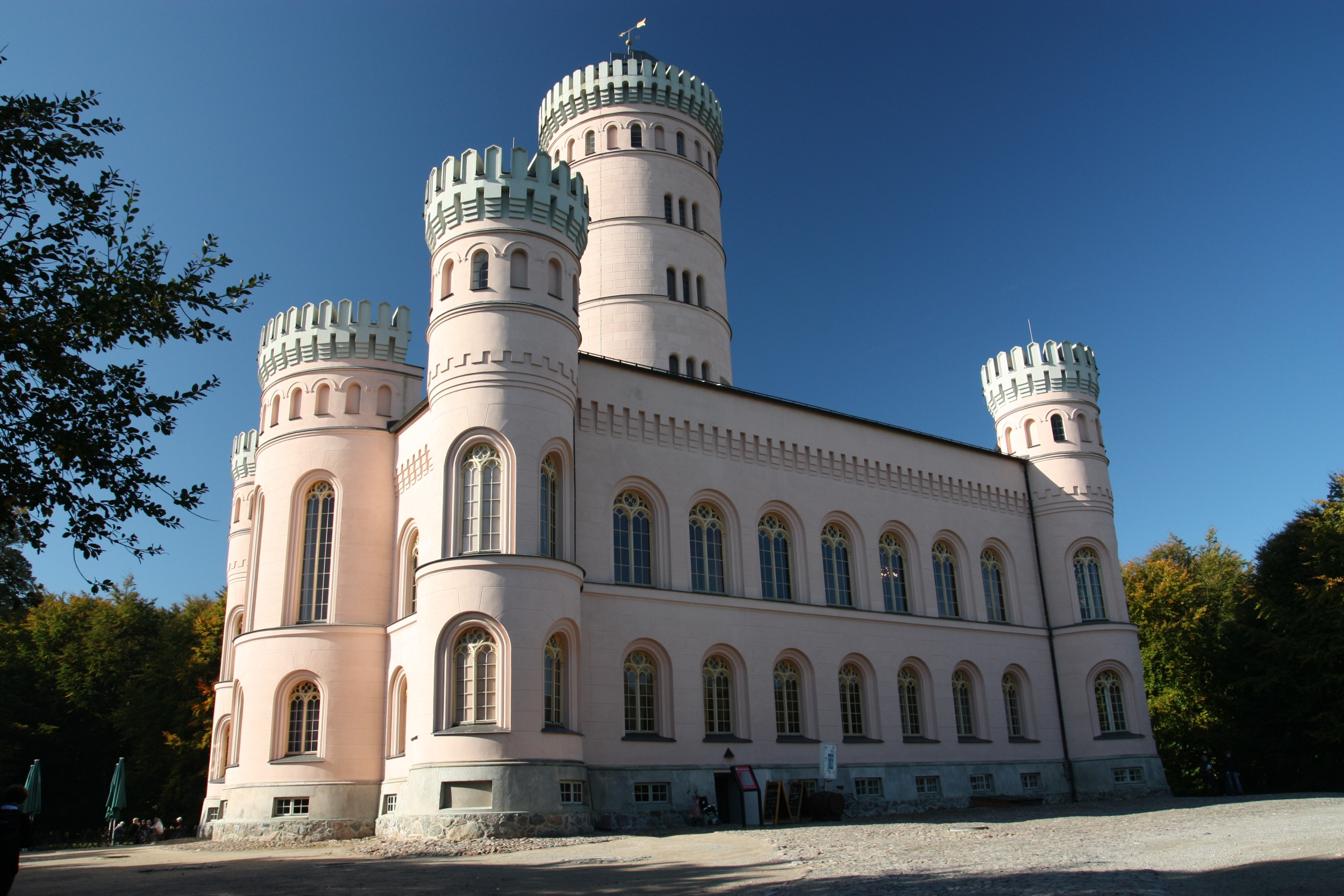
- Jagdschloss Granitz (hunting castle near Binz)

- Location of Lancken-Granitz within Vorpommern-Rügen district
- Interactive map of Lancken-Granitz
- Location within Germany Location within Mecklenburg-Vorpommern
- Coordinates: 54°22′N 13°38′E
- Country: Germany
- State: Mecklenburg-Vorpommern
- District: Vorpommern-Rügen
- Municipal assoc.: Mönchgut-Granitz

Government
  - Mayor: Klaus-Dieter Golle

Area
  - Total: 13.78 km^{2} (5.32 sq mi)
- Elevation: 25 m (82 ft)

Population (2025-12-31)
  - Total: 454
  - Density: 32.9/km^{2} (85.3/sq mi)
- Time zone: UTC+01:00 (CET)
  - Summer (DST): UTC+02:00 (CEST)
- Postal codes: 18586
- Dialling codes: 038301, 038303, 038393
- Vehicle registration: RÜG
- Website: www.amt-moenchgut.de

Lancken-Granitz is a municipality in the Vorpommern-Rügen district, in Mecklenburg-Vorpommern, Germany. Near the villages of Lancken and Burtevitz are several megalith tombs from the Neolithic.

The Lancken-Granitz municipality consists of the following villages:

- Lancken-Granitz
- Blieschow
- Burtevitz
- Dummertevitz
- Garftitz
- Gobbin
- Neu Reddevitz
- Preetz (Rügen)
- Zarnekow
