= Lancken-Granitz dolmens =

Megalithic tomb in Germany

Coordinates: 54.36286°N 13.61901°E

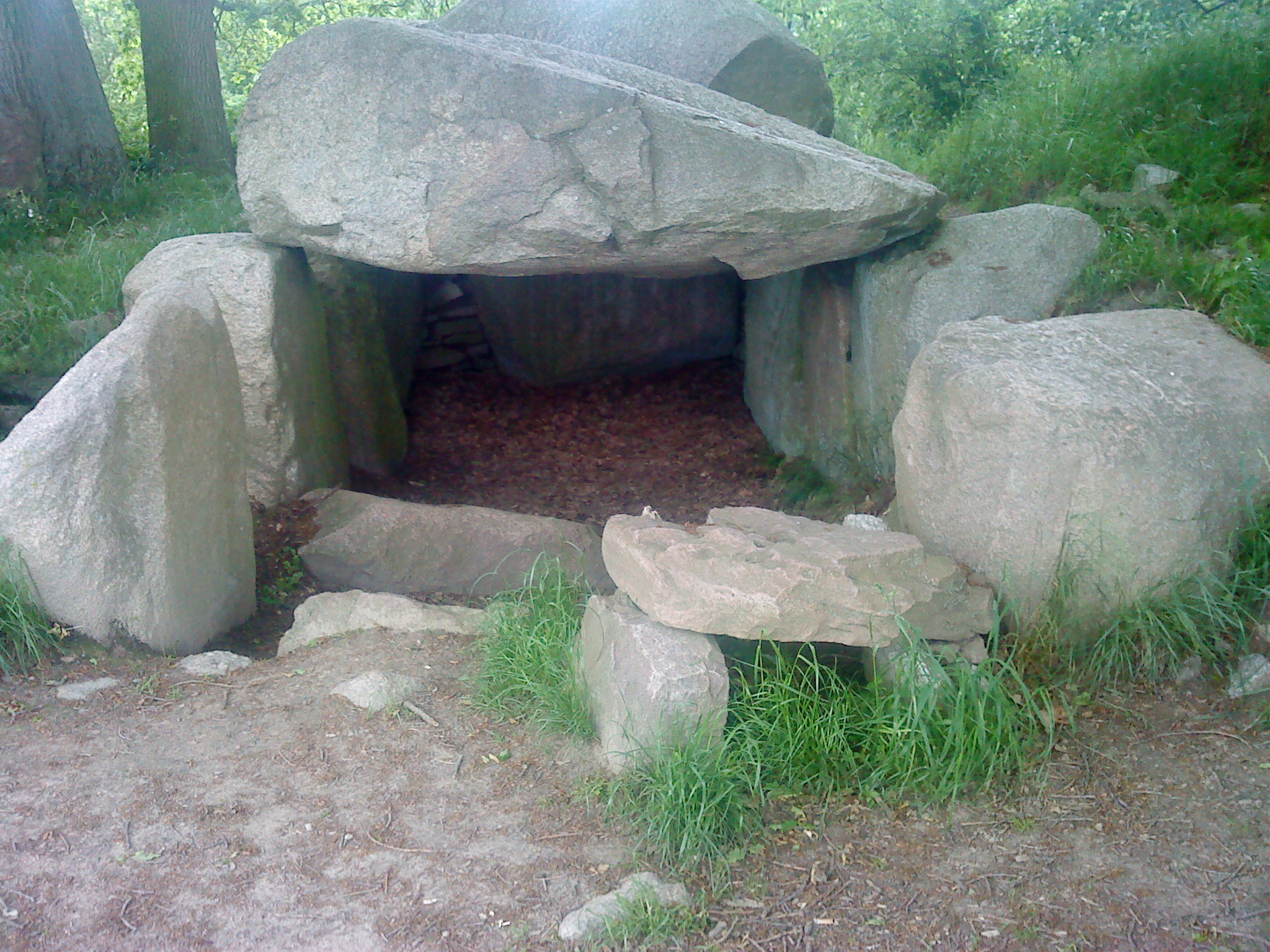
Lancken-Granitz, easternmost dolmen

The Lancken-Granitz dolmens are a group of seven megalith tombs in the Lancken-Granitz municipality on Rügen, northern Germany. Erected during the middle Neolithic, when they were used by the Funnelbeaker culture, at least some were in use until the early Bronze Age. Three of them are encircled by solitary rocks forming either rectangles or a stone circle, and one has a solitary "guardian stone" on its eastern side.

The dolmens were constructed from glacial erratic boulders and red sandstone. In part subdivided into up to four compartments as common for the region, one dolmen showed a subdivision into six such compartments, which is an unusually high number. When the tombs were archaeologically assessed in 1969, Stone and Bronze Age funerary goods were retrieved, including flint hatches, stone axes, amber pearls, bronze needles and necklaces as well as an abundance of arrowheads and pottery.

== Background ==
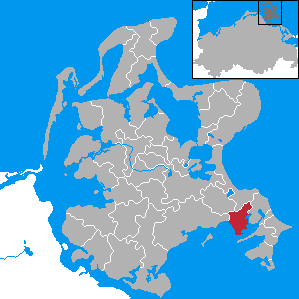
Location of the Lancken-Granitz municipality on Rügen (large map) and within Mecklenburg-Vorpommern (small map)

The dolmens are located in the southeastern part of Rügen, Mecklenburg-Vorpommern, south of the federal route B196, just southwest of the village Lancken-Granitz and northwest of the village Burtevitz, both part of the Lancken-Granitz municipality. A group of seven dolmens is lined up northwest of the road between Lancken and Klein Stresow, numbered 1 to 7 from the northeast to the southwest. This numbering follows Schmidt (2001), other publications use different numeration codes. Dolmen Nr. 6 and Nr. 7 belong to the Burtevitz subdistrict, which also contains several megaliths, but are nevertheless included with the Lancken-Granitz Dolmen per Schmidt (2001), as they lie just across the border to the Lancken-Granitz district that runs between dolmen Nr. 5 and Nr. 6.

The dolmens are part of a series built between 3,500 and 3,200 BC, during the Neolithic. As of 2001, about 400 of those are preserved in Mecklenburg-Vorpommern, 55 of which are located on the isle of Rügen. Initially their number had been much larger, but many were destroyed when their boulders were used for church, housing and street construction since the Middle Ages. In the 20th century, local teacher Friedrich-Wilhelm Furthmann and his wife preserved the dolmens in the Lancken-Granitz and Burtevitz area, before they were excavated by archaeologist Ewald Schuldt in 1969 and immediately thereafter restored for touristic use. This was part of a series of 106 excavations conducted by Schuldt's team on megalith sites in present-day Mecklenburg-Vorpommern between 1964 and 1972.

== Encirclements ==
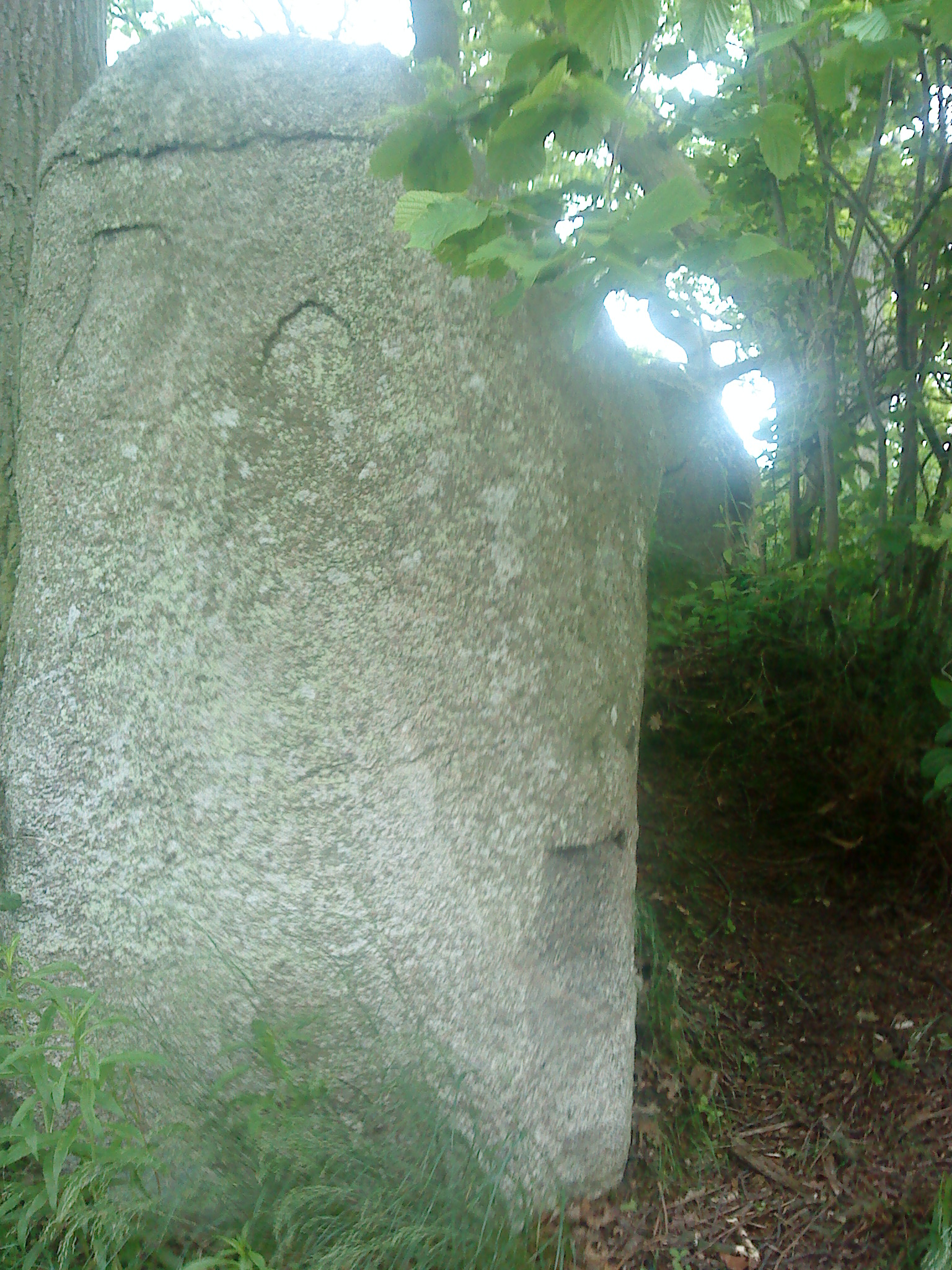
"Guardian stone"

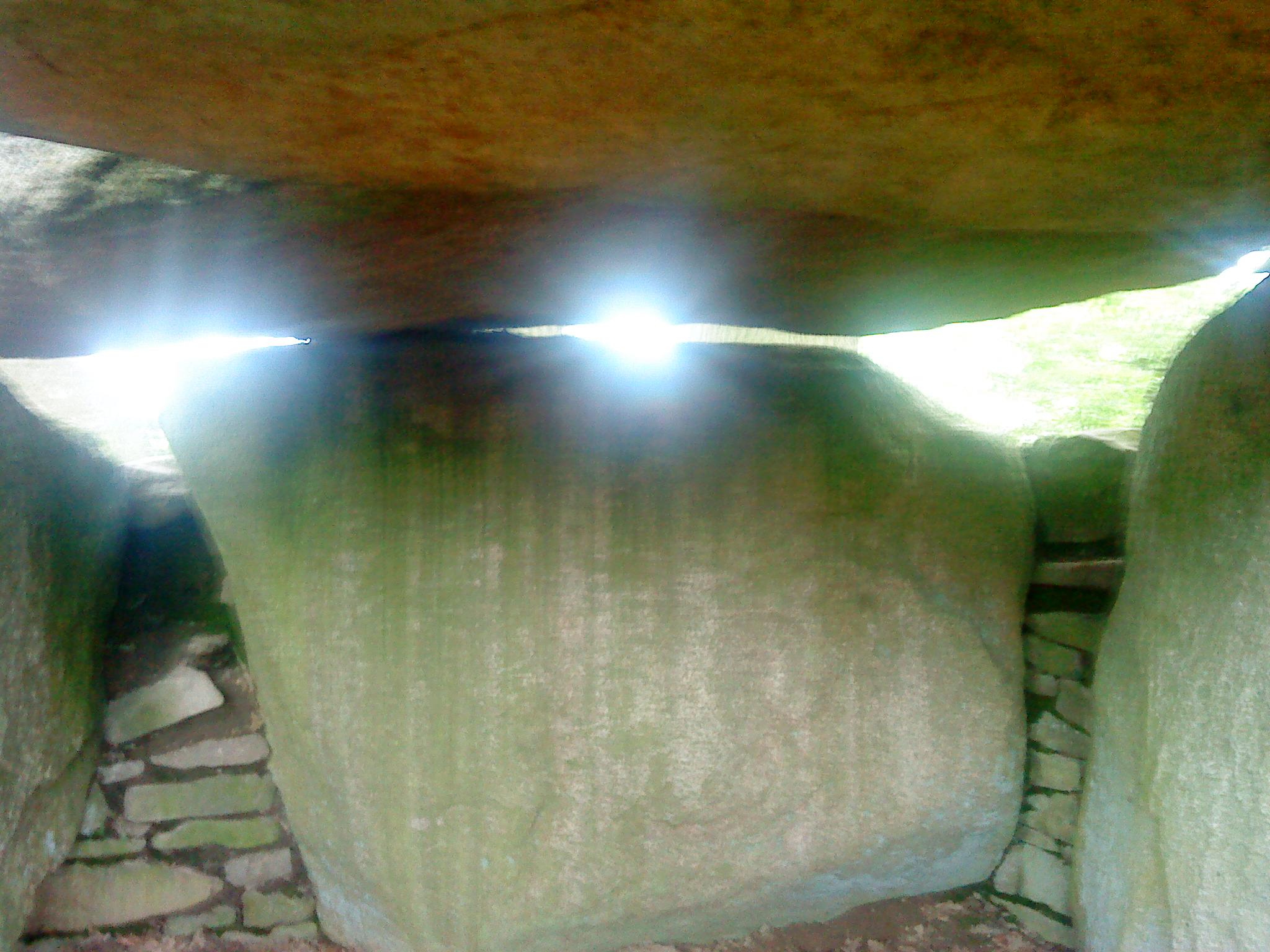
Dolmen Nr. 1, interior: the gaps between the large boulders are filled with red sandstone

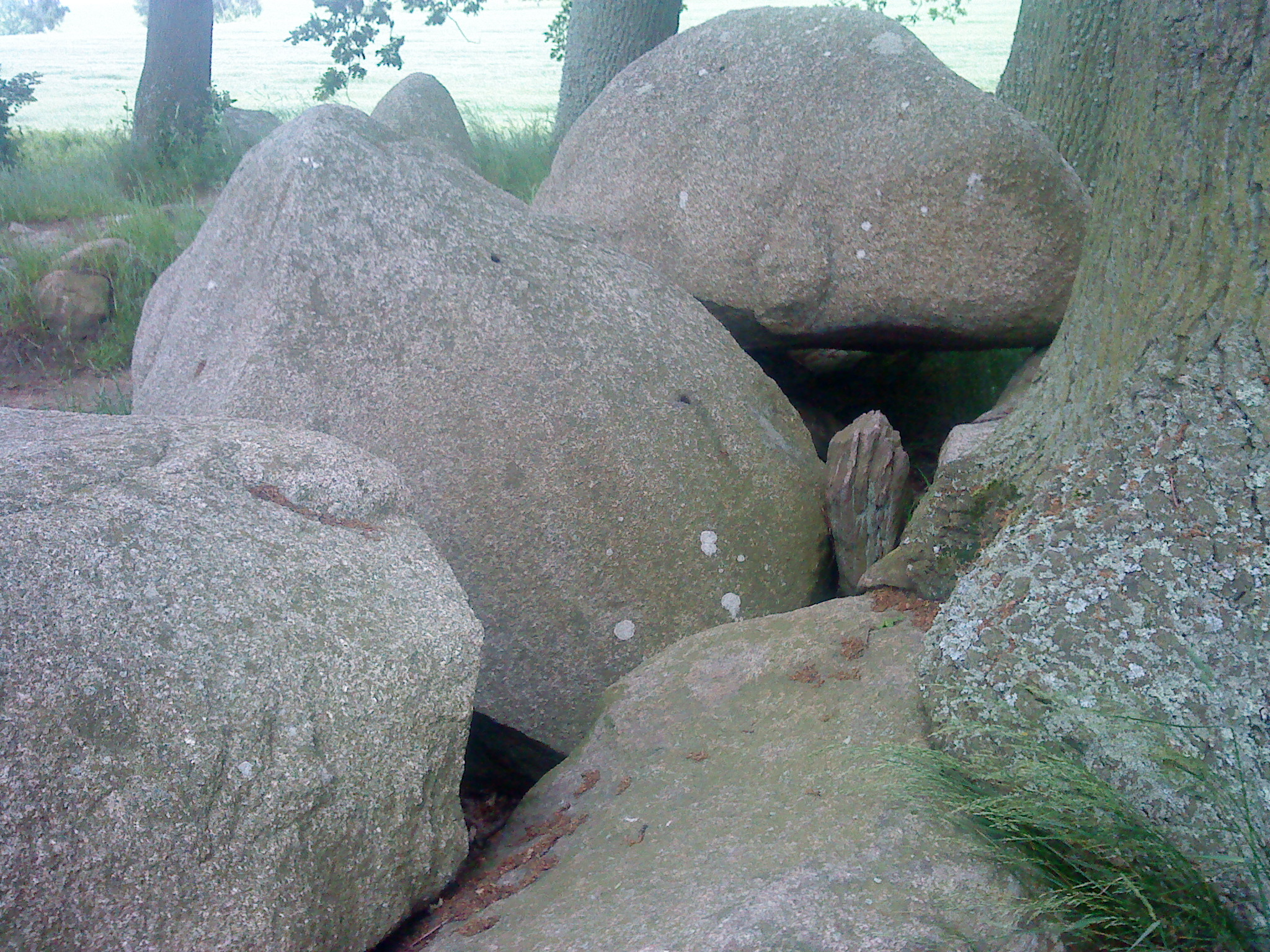
Ceiling of dolmen Nr. 3

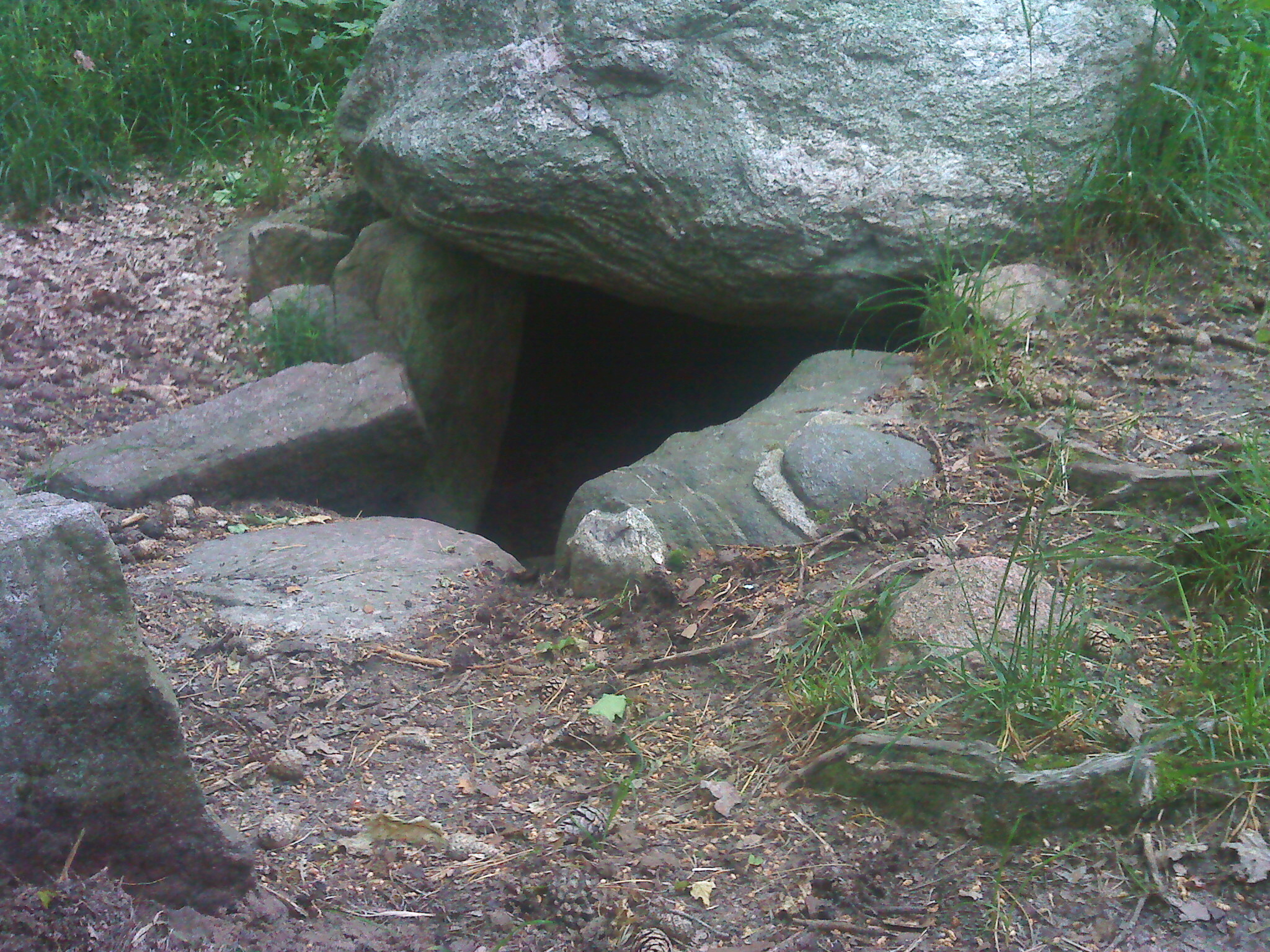
Dolmen Nr. 6, entrance

Three dolmens are encircled by standing, solitary rocks which either form a rectangular shape (Hünenbett, dolmen Nr. 1 and 3), the most common form of Neolithic tomb encirclement structures, or a stone circle (Bannkreis, dolmen Nr. 6) with unknown, proposedly magic, function.

Both Hünenbett shapes are oriented from east to west, and their long sides measure 20.5 metres (67 ft) and 20 metres (66 ft), respectively. At the Hünenbett around dolmen Nr. 3, only 16 boulders are still in place, while initially each long side had comprised 13 boulders. A "guardian stone" is placed adjacent to its eastern narrow side.

The stone circle around dolmen Nr. 6 has a diameter of 12 metres (39 ft). The dolmens are located in the center of their respective encirclements (dolmen Nr. 3 and 6) or at its western end (dolmen Nr. 1).

== The dolmens ==
All dolmens were constructed from glacial erratic boulders, with the gaps filled with plates of red sandstone and clay. The entrance was typically made from two upright sandstone plates covered by another rock. Similar sandstone plates were used to subdivide the interior of some of the dolmens into a hallway with adjacent compartments. E.g. dolmen Nr. 1, the largest one, had three such chambers on each side of the hallway, while a subdivision could not be demonstrated for dolmen Nr. 2. Division into one to four compartments is common for dolmens, yet dolmen Nr. 1 with its six compartments is noted as a rare exception.

Common Neolithic funerary goods found in the dolmens of the region are tools, pottery, and amber pearls. It is assumed that the pots were filled with groceries, and that there were also other, long decomposed organic funerary goods. Most probably, a magic function was ascribed to the amber pearls, especially the ones of a double axe shape. Funerary goods found in each dolmen near Lancken include flint hatches, chisels, amber pearls, and pottery, the latter being in part of the Funnelbeaker (TRB) type. An abundance of arrowheads were found in dolmens Nr. 1 through 5. Stone blades were found in dolmens Nr. 1, 3, 4 and 5. Two stone axes were excavated in dolmen Nr. 1, one double-edged, and another two stone axes were found in dolmen Nr. 3, one of the rare Nackenkammaxt type. Other finds include a granite rubbing stone (dolmen Nr. 3) and a Gnidel- or Krähenstein (dolmen Nr. 4, a small, black flintstone rounded by the sea). Remains of human skulls and bones were found in dolmen Nr. 3 and Nr. 4.

Several of the Lancken-Granitz dolmens remained in use until the early (Nordic) Bronze Age. In dolmen Nr. 1, fragments of a bronze needle and a bronze necklace were found, and in dolmen Nr. 3, a bronze needle with one end rolled-up, a bronze finger ring, and part of a bronze necklace. In the early Bronze Age, dolmen Nr. 1 was abandoned and filled with rocks and dirt, had its entrance closed and was covered by an artificial hill. Likewise, dolmen Nr. 6 including its stone circle was covered by a hill, 2 metres (6.6 ft) in height, and it was discovered only in 1969 that it was not a tumulus, but a dolmen - it had even been protected as a Bronze Age tumulus before.

The dolmens were nevertheless frequented by the local population throughout the Iron Age as well as the Slavic and the early German period, as multiple archaeological finds show, yet they were also used as a dump by the local East German LPG for "stones which had been cleared from the fields". Dolmen Nr. 6 was re-used as a burial site during the late Slavic period, while else the Rani erected burial mounds of their own, keeping them in some distance to the dolmens. In recent history, its excavated dolmen was used as a shelter by the East German army.

== See also ==
- Early history of Pomerania
- Flint tool
