= Havelland culture =

Archaeological culture in Germany

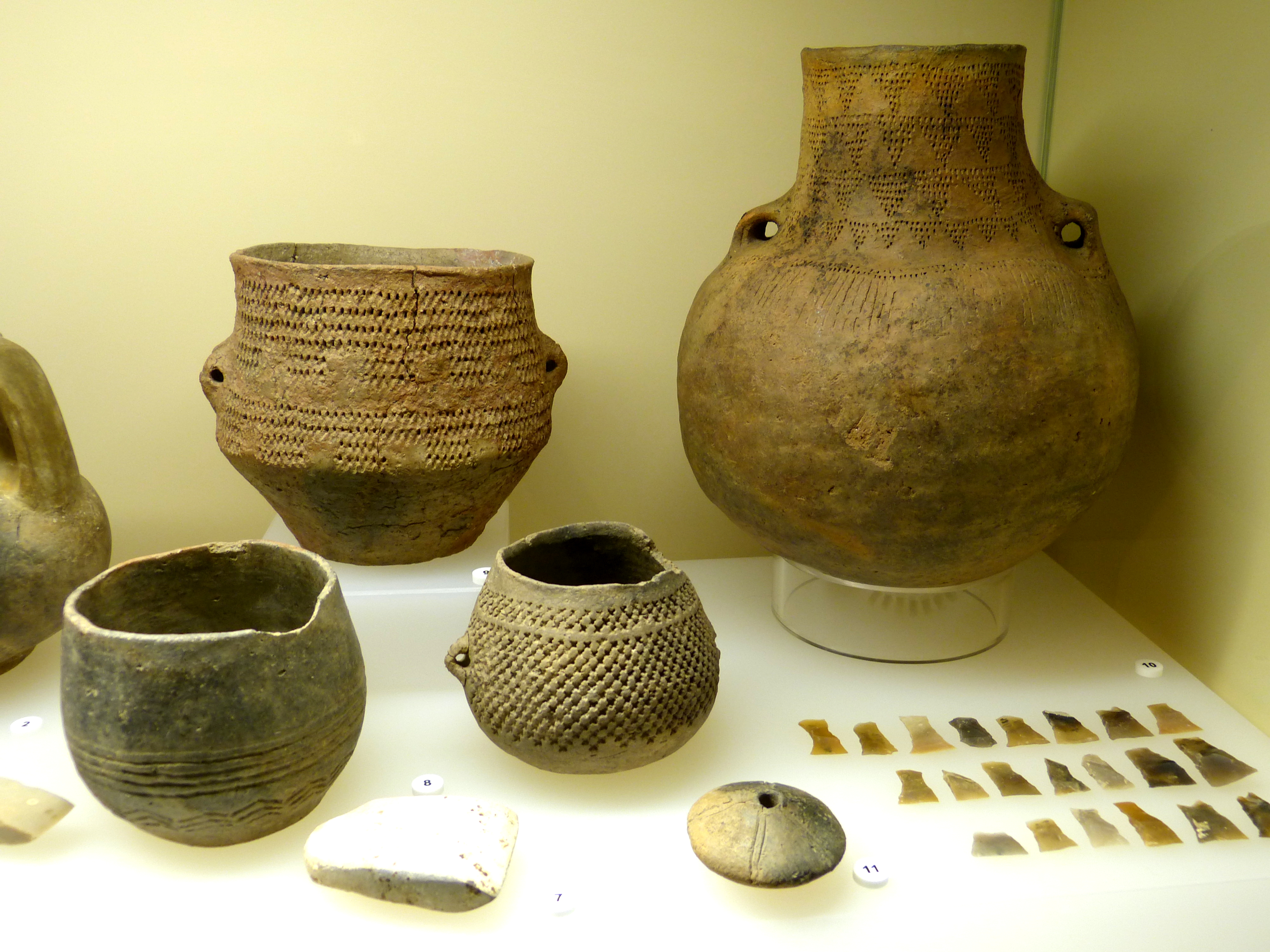
Neolithic pottery of the Havelland culture

Havelland culture (German: Havelländische Kultur) was a Neolithic archaeological culture in northeastern Germany, centered at Havelland, with contacts to the Globular Amphora culture. It was characterized by cups with handles, amphoras with two handles, and barrels and dishes with carpet-like decorations. The dead were buried unburned. The Havelland people were farmers and breeders.

== Literature ==
- E.Probst: Deutschland in der Steinzeit, München 1991, 386 - 388.ISBN 3-572-01058-6
- H.Behrens: Die Jungsteinzeit im Mittelelbe-Saale-Gebiet, Berlin 1973, 114 - 116.
- G.Wetzel: Jungsteinzeit, In: Potsdam, Brandenburg und das Havelland (Führer zu archäologischen Denkmälern in Deutschland 37), 39 - 52 und 145 - 152. ISBN 3-8062-1489-1
