= Vidivarii =

European Iron Age cultural group

The Vidivarii are described by Jordanes in his Getica as a melting pot of tribes who in the mid-6th century lived at the lower Vistula:

Ad litus oceani, ubi tribus faucibus fluenta Vistulae fluminibus ebibuntur, Vidivarii resident ex diversis nationibus aggregati.

Though differing from the earlier Willenberg culture, some traditions were continued, thus the corresponding archaeological culture is sometimes described as the Vidivarian or widiwar stage of the Willenberg culture. The bearers of the Willenberg culture have been associated with a heterogeneous people comprising Vistula Veneti, Goths, Rugii, and Gepids. One hypothesis, based on the sudden appearance of large amounts of Roman solidi and migrations of other groups after the breakdown of the Hun empire in 453, suggest a partial re-migration of earlier emigrants to their former northern homelands.

== Etymology ==
The first element vid/wid means "wood" (sacred grove ?), from Proto-Germanic *widuz. The second element -varii is most prolific among Germanic tribal names (Ampsivarii, Angrivarii, Raetovarii, Falchovarii, Baiuvarii, ...), commonly taken to mean "inhabitants of", "dwellers in". Its precise etymology remains unclear.

== See also ==
- Willenberg culture
- Early history of Pomerania
