= Pomeranian Coarsewool =

Breed of sheep

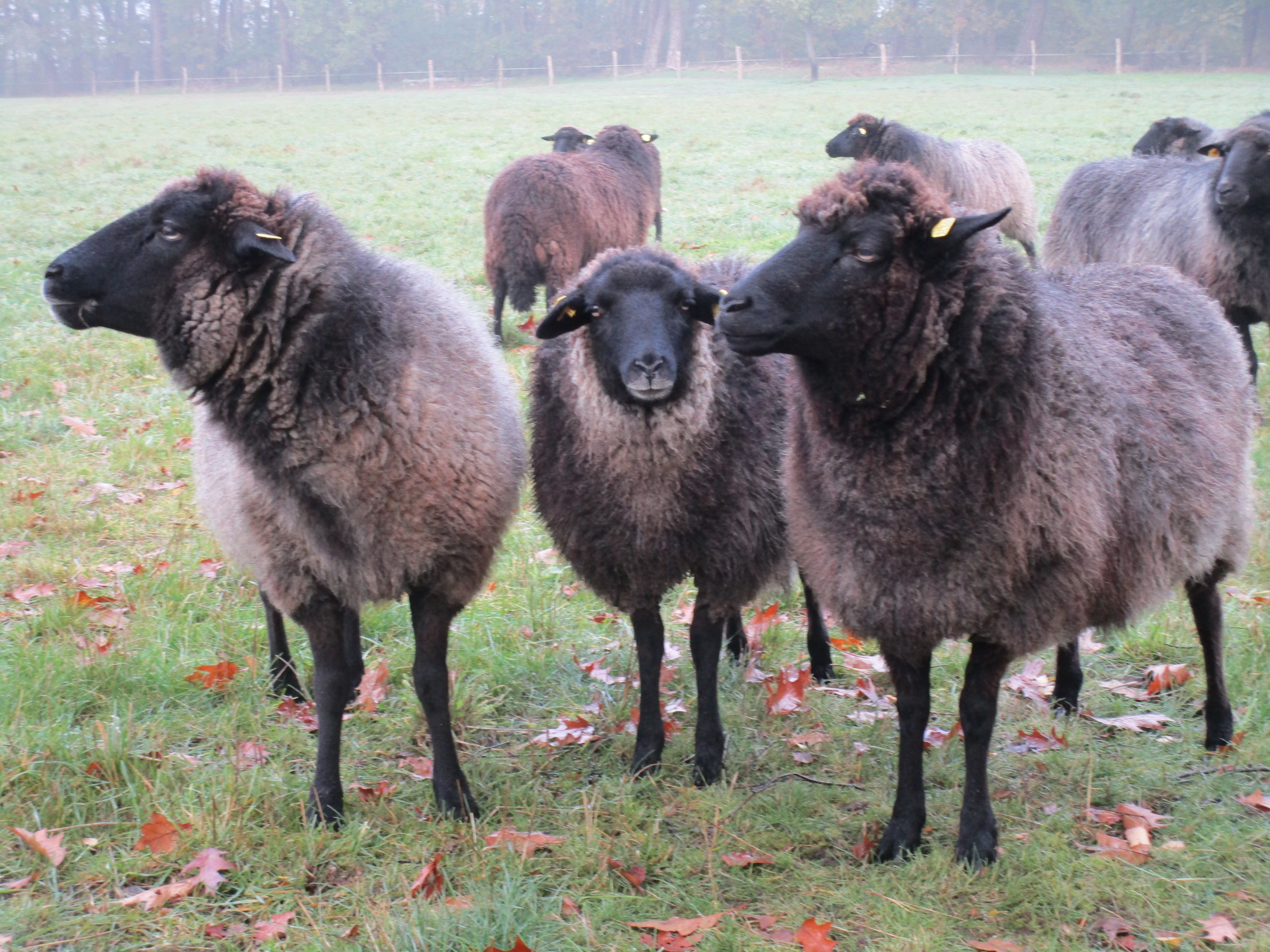
Pomeranian Coarsewool Sheep

The Pomeranian Coarsewool or simply Pomeranian (German: Pommersches Rauhwollschaf; Pommernschaf; Rauhwolliges Pommersches Landschaf) is an old domestic sheep breed from the Pomerania region. The first records of similar sheep in Pomerania can be traced to more than 3000 years ago. This breed is raised primarily for meat and vegetation management.

== Characteristics ==
This breed is polled (hornless), and has a black head with slate-blue or grey wool on the body – lambs are born wholly black. The legs are also covered with wool, and the tongue is blue. The fleece has shorter hairs amongst the longer wool.

The breed is very hardy and is able to live outside all year, even raising lambs in the snow. The sheep thrive on poor forage.

Ewes average around 55 kg (121 lb) in weight, and rams about 65 kg (143 lb). The fleece ranges from 3.5 to 7 kg (7.7 to 15.4 lb).

== History ==
Initially, this breed was called Grauwollschafe ("greywool sheep"), which in time changed to Rauhwollschafe ("coarsewool sheep") by dropping the first letter. The breed almost vanished in the second half of the 20th century, when the population dropped below 100 and it was placed on the Red List of endangered livestock breeds. The population has since recovered somewhat.

== See also ==
- Conservation grazing
