= Stralsund dugouts =

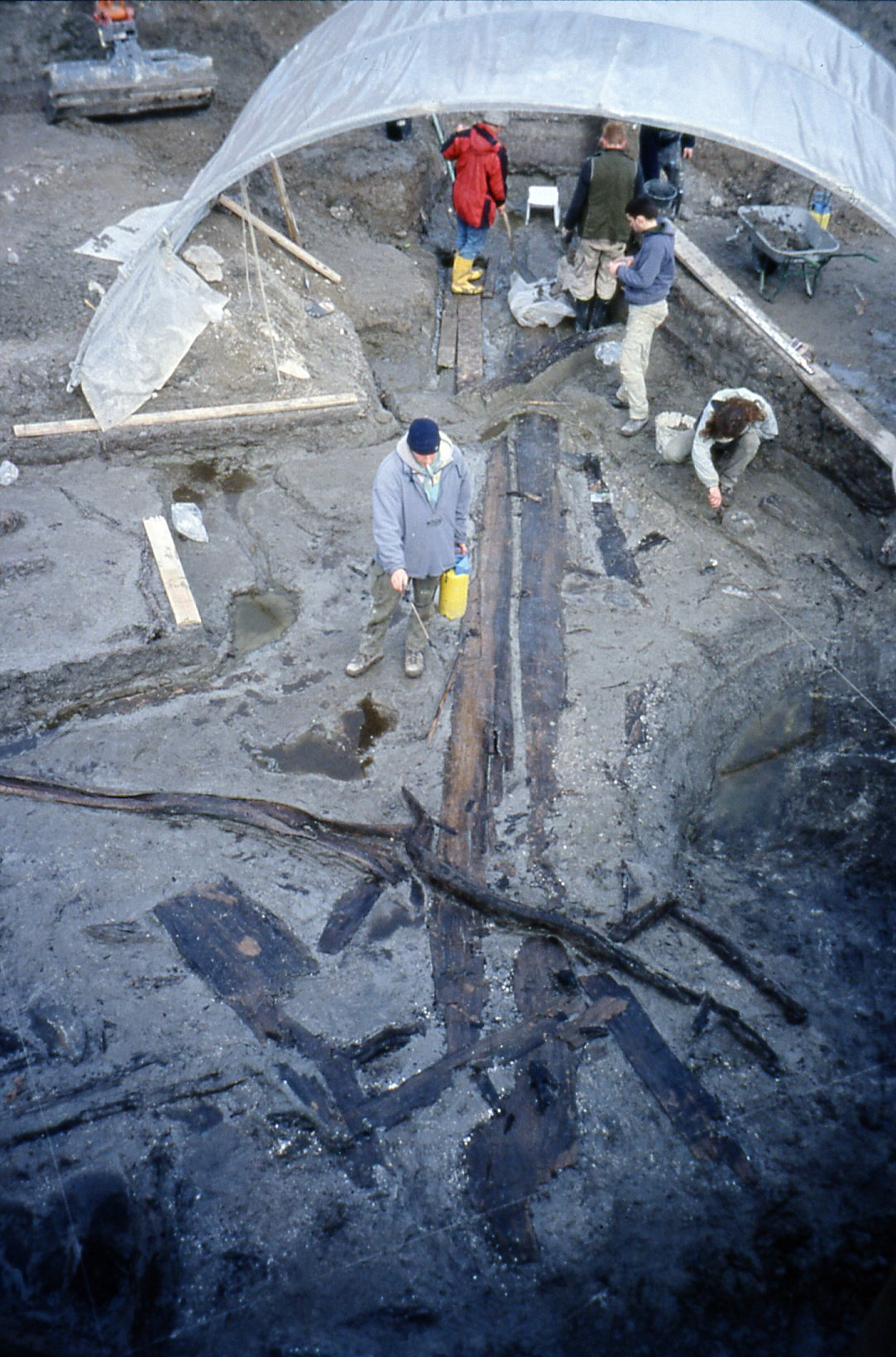
The dugouts at the findspot (2002)

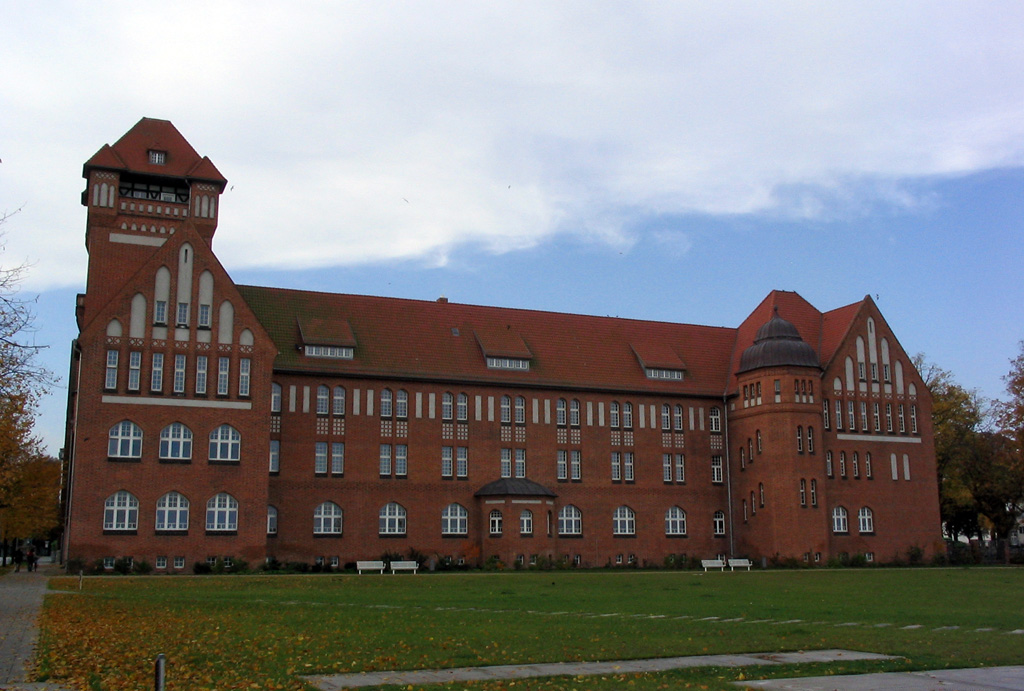
Hansa-Gymnasium, location of the discovery

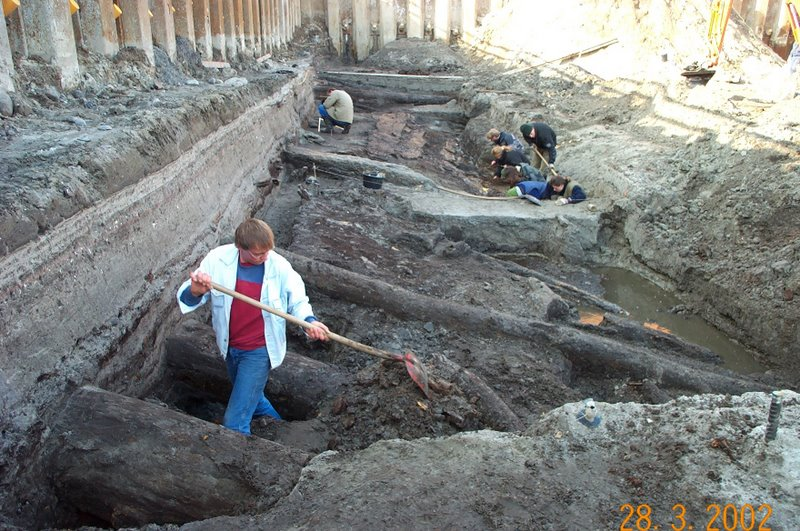
Dugouts 2 and 3 on 20 March 2002

The Stralsund dugouts (Einbäume von Stralsund or Einbäume vom Strelasund) were three dugout canoes made of linden wood found in Stralsund, Mecklenburg-Vorpommern, Germany in 2002. Two of these canoes were around 7,000 years old, making them the oldest surviving boats from the Baltic region. The third was about 6,000 years old and at twelve metres in length was the longest known vessel from this period. The finds were excavated in 2002 and taken to Schwerin for conservation, but improper storage led to their total destruction by 2004. This was the subject of controversy when it became public knowledge in March 2009.

== Discovery ==
In 2002, construction workers building a reservoir for rainwater on the shore of the Strelasund in Stralsund, in front of the Hansa Gymnasium found wooden remains of a hitherto unknown Neolithic settlement four metres below the surface. These had been preserved for thousands of years as a result of the waterlogged soil. Archaeologists from the Mecklenburg-Vorpommern office for culture and heritage investigated the site and found common periwinkle shells, worked timber, flint cores, harpoons, and dedications belonging to the Ertebølle culture, the final phase of hunters and gatherers in the southwestern Baltic region. A Neolithic funnelbeaker was also among the finds.

The three dugout canoes found in this excavation are the oldest watercraft yet found in northern Germany. The boats were made from two-inch thick shells of linden wood. Two of them date to around 5000 BC. The third dates to 4,000 BC. It is possible that the settlement had been destroyed by a sudden flood. Masses of earth had fully covered the dugouts and conserved the organic remains from the Stone Age to the present day. Four people would have fitted in the largest dugout, which was 60 cm wide and 12 metres long. The material of the boats is comparable to the Mesolithic boats found at Tybrind vig in Denmark.

== Removal and storage ==
Because the dugouts were made of very thin, soft wood, it was necessary that the finds be excavated, transferred to the State Archaeological Museum in Schwerin, and undergo conservation work at the state office for heritage management in Schwerin as quickly as possible. The finds needed to be subjected to a standard procedure in underwater archaeology, in which the water in the wood is slowly replaced with a form of artificial wax and then freeze-dried, to ensure their long-term stability.

The finds, along with associated soil, were loaded onto 36 steel pallets by the office for heritage management, wrapped in foil, and transported to the conservation facilities for waterlogged wood in Schwerin. However, there was not sufficient capacity to conserve the finds. The dugouts were therefore kept damp by spraying them water. This was considered an emergency procedure to be used for a few weeks at most. In summer 2002, the finds suffered damage from dehumidification. When the building where the boats were stored partially collapsed in 2004, the remains of the dugouts were buried underneath it. But the canoes had already mostly rotted by this point, and the collapse was not responsible for any further damage. After this, all attempts to keep the canoes humidified were abandoned.

Andreas Grüger, director of the Stralsund Museum, stated that he had made regularly inquiries regarding the condition of the dugouts and had received only evasive responses. In 2008, the archaeologist of the Schwerin office, Detlef Jantzen, explained in detail how he thought the boats should be conserved, in response to requests from the Ostsee-Zeitung.

== Destruction and consequences ==
In March 2009, the World Heritage advisory board of the city of Stralsund submitted a request to the Schwerin office, regarding the current state of the boats and asking when the boats would be returned to Stralsund. The city was planning to present the boats as part of a special exhibition, but was informed that they had been destroyed. The acting head of the office, Michael Bednorz, stated that the archaeological finds had already been destroyed in 2004. An undergraduate project had been underway since 2008 at HTW Berlin to try to salvage some aspect of the boats.

Klaus-Michael Körner, an SPD representative in the Landtag of Mecklenburg-Vorpommern, accused the former head of the state office for heritage management, Friedrich Lüth, of responsibility for the destruction of the artefacts. Lüth denied these accusations and declared that he had first been notified of the boats' destruction on 11 March 2009. In fact, Lüth had written to the state ministry of culture on 5 June 2002, "finally, I must remind you of the urgency of the situation. The dugouts are beginning to decay!" and on 16 July 2002, "The sensational finds... are generally in a dire state. If no thing is done soon, it will no longer be possible to conserve these finds." In March 2009, Lüth stated that all appropriate measures had been taken for the preservation of the boats immediately after their discovery in 2002. He further stated that the dugouts had not already dried out in 2004, stating that "until 2005, they were regularly sprayed." However, he stated that after the partial collapse of the building, the finds had "probably been forgotten." He also stated in an interview on NDR 1 Radio MV that the boats were not completely lost, "the small fragments of the dugouts are not at all unsalvageably lost. It is just that they are no longer preserved in a moist condition." He claimed that they were evenly dried and thus remained in a stable condition.

In the middle of March 2009, the State prosecutor's office of Schwerin began investigating whether criminal negligence had taken place. Proceedings were abandoned in September 2009 as a result of the statute of limitations.

A special commission established by the state government concluded in May 2009 that the dugouts had been destroyed as a result of improper storage. They placed the responsibility for this on the leadership of the state office at the time. They also found that the ministry of culture had not fulfilled its duty of oversight in the years 2002 to 2004.

== Bibliography ==
- P. Kaute, G. Schindler, and H. Lübke, "Der endmesolithisch/frühneolithische Fundplatz Stralsund-Mischwasserspeicher – Zeugnisse früher Bootsbautechnologie an der Ostseeküste Mecklenburg-Vorpommerns." Jahrb. Bodendenkmalpflege Mecklenburg-Vorpommern 52, 2004, 221–241
