= 7th millennium BC =

Millennium between 7000 BC and 6001 BC

The 7th millennium BC spanned the years 7000 BC to 6001 BC (c. 9000 – c. 8000 years before present). While the global climate entered the Holocene climatic optimum during the first half of the millennium, much of the Northern Hemisphere cooled during the latter half, due to cooling from the Siberian High and especially the 8.2-kiloyear event, the latter caused by the collapse of the Laurentide Ice Sheet into the North Atlantic over several centuries. The Neolithic Expansion saw agriculture, pottery, and Neolithic technologies spread from the Fertile Crescent into western Anatolia and Southeastern Europe by the end of the millennium. Agricultural cultures are known to have emerged in Central Asia, as well as at Mehrgarh in Pakistan. In East Asia, sedentary rice and millet cultivation spread across the Yangtze and Yellow River basins, while pottery spread into Korea. Pastoralism and pottery spread into eastern North Africa during the 7th millennium BC, while migratory populations in the Americas began to experiment with horticulture.

== Environmental changes ==
Following a steady rise in global temperature since the end of the Younger Dryas two millennia prior, global temperatures reached a peak during the first half of the 7th millennium BC, beginning a period known as the Holocene climatic optimum. In paleoclimatology, the period from 6700 to 6000 BC is referred to as the Boreal period, generally warmer but drier than the Preboreal. The westward spread of cold air from the Siberian High, one of a number of abrupt climate change events during the Holocene, significantly contributed to cooling in the Northern Hemisphere from around 6,600 to 6,000 BC.

Since the end of the Younger Dryas, northern Africa had been in the most advanced phase of the African humid period, seeing its wettest climate of the past 100,000 years. The seasonal monsoon cycle reemerged, allowing for savanna to spread as far north as the Ahaggar Mountains and Tassili n'Ajjer of Algeria. During this period, the climate of the Sahara resembled that of the modern Sahel.

Around the beginning of the 7th millennium BC, the surface of the Ancylus Lake (the last freshwater stage of the Baltic Sea) reached sea level, possibly due to outflow through Vänern. Small inflows of seawater through the Danish Straits led to increasingly brackish conditions, eventually transitioning the Baltic into the Mastogloia Sea phase by the end of the millennium. The North Sea expanded south into Doggerland due to sea level rise. By the end of the millennium, land on the Dogger Bank was cut off from Great Britain and mainland Europe, although the English Channel would not fully open until the mid-6th millennium BC. A massive tsunami caused by the Storegga Slide occurred in the Norwegian Sea in about 6200 BC, inundating the Norwegian and North Sea coasts, devastating human populations in the region and likely creating long-lasting folk stories of the event. The slide was previously linked to the disappearance of Doggerland, although it is now considered unlikely that all the remaining area of Doggerland was flooded.

By the end of the millennium, rising sea levels also opened the Torres Strait, separating New Guinea from continental Australia.

=== 8.2-kiloyear event ===
Reconstructed temperatures from ice cores in central Greenland, showing the 8.2-kiloyear event

The 7th millennium BC saw the transition of the first stage of the Holocene geological epoch, the Greenlandian, into the Northgrippian or "Middle Holocene". The 8.2-kiloyear event, the dividing line between the two stages, occurred around 6200, compounding with the already existing cooling effect of the Siberian High's expansion. The collapse of the ice saddle connecting the Baffin and Labrador ice domes accelerated the collapse of the Laurentide Ice Sheet, and allowed for meltwater to steadily flow into the North Atlantic for several centuries. This raised sea levels by several meters over the following centuries and disrupted the Atlantic meridional overturning circulation, plunging temperatures in Europe. Additionally, this allowed the large glacial lakes Agassiz and Ojibway to drain through the newly-created outlet in the Hudson Strait through several pulses. One such pulse, lasting between six months and five years, raised global sea level by around 23 centimetres (0.75 ft). Continued small-scale melting of the Antarctic ice sheet contributed a relatively minor amount to global sea level rise, around 2.5–3 cm (1.0–1.2 in) per century over the course of the 8th and 7th millennia BC.

The climate anomaly created by the 8.2-kiloyear event caused a rapid cooling of 1–3 °C (34–37 °F), most prominent during wintertime, across Europe and North America. This persisted for around 160 years. The Northern hemisphere began to experience cooler summers, followed by the onset of drier winters around 28 years later. Conditions were most anomalous in the years immediately following the event, slowly moderating over the following decades. The event led to drier monsoon conditions in Africa and western Asia, drier conditions in the Great Plains, and a southward shift of the Intertropical Convergence Zone in South America. The Southern Hemisphere and East Asia do not show signs of any significant cooling during this period.

== Asia ==
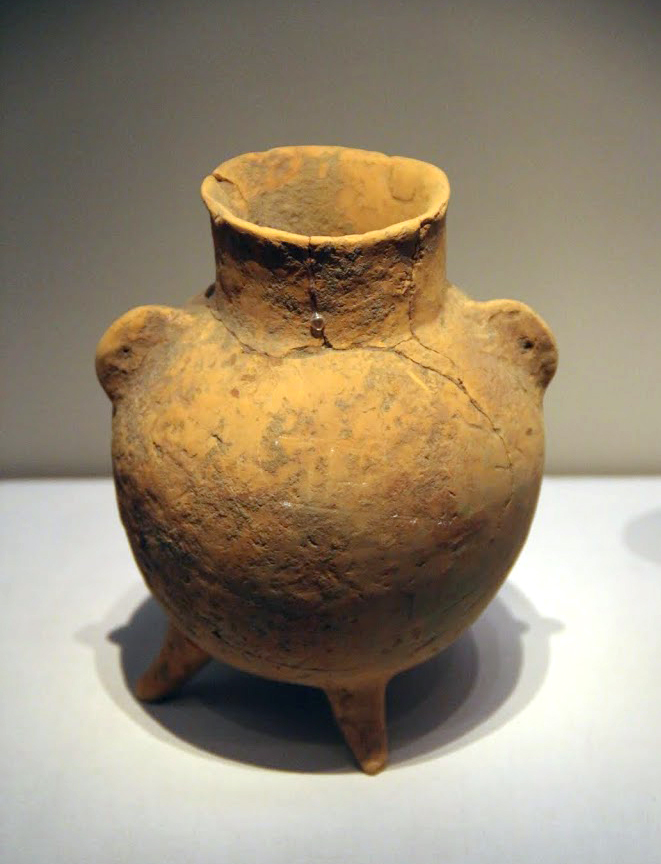
Peligang culture pottery

=== East Asia ===
In what is now eastern China, the gradual emerge rice and millet cultivation continued the slow process of domestication from its early Holocene beginnings. Sedentary rice cultivators existed along the central Yangtze by the end of the previous millennium. Further north, the large millet-farming villages of the Peiligang culture emerged along the middle Yellow River by the middle of the 7th millennium BC. Genetic evidence points to the divergence of millet cultivars around the end of the millennium. One Peligang site, Jiahu, produced a rich variety of pottery and bone crafts. Some tortoise shells and bones recovered from the sites bear carved symbols reminiscent of the 2nd millennium BC oracle bone script; although unlikely to be writing in its own right, some scholars have described them as an early form of proto-writing used for ritualistic purposes.

Pottery was already well-established in Japan and portions of the Amur river basin during the 7th millennium BC. For Japan, the millennium is classified as part of the Initial Jōmon stage of the Jōmon period. The introduction of pottery in the Korean Peninsula is often dated to the 7th millennium BC, as society adopted sedentism and likely plant cultivation. This period is typically included within the earliest phases of the Jeulmun period, although the Jeulmun culture proper would not emerge until later into the period, predated by early pottery cultures such as the Ossani (in northern Korea) and the Yunggimun (in the southeast).

=== North and Central Asia ===
The 7th millennium saw the first definitive signs of agriculture in Central Asia. In what is now Afghanistan, Hindu Kush sites such as Ghar-i-Mar contain stone farming implements alongside the remains of domesticated sheep and goats. To the northwest, the Jeitun culture flourished across the Kopet Dag. Named for the type site of Jeitun in modern Turkmenistan, the Jeitun people formed large agricultural settlements. They grew grains such as barley, alongside einkorn, emmer, and bread wheat. Agriculture may have developed independently in Central Asia, or spread from contact with the Fertile Crescent of West Asia. The latter is possibly evidenced by the lack of wild wheat or barley in the archaeological record. In what is now Kyrgyzstan and Tajikistan, the Neolithic (but non-agricultural) Hissar culture emerged during the late 7th millennium BC.

The population increased in Western Siberia during the late 7th millennium BC, possibly due to the effects of the 8.2-kiloyear event. Settlements were founded such as the Amnya complex, one of the earliest known fortifications.

=== South Asia ===
The farming settlement of Mehrgarh, in what is now Pakistan, was occupied by the 7th millennium BC. The site consisted of around two dozen mudbrick houses. Plant cultivation and animal herding may have developed independently in the region, evidenced by the likely independent domestication of the zebu. Due to evidence of innovations such as communal food storage and social stratification, agriculture in the region likely predates the site. Burials from Mehrgarh contain seashells and lapis lazuli, indicating trade with coastal areas and Afghanistan.

Further into the Indian subcontinent lived hunter-gatherers exploiting the lucrative wet climate of the region during the early Holocene. Sedentary foragers occupied much of the Gangetic Plains during the millennium. Uncertain early evidence of pottery and rice cultivation in the region may date to this period, such as at the site of Lahuradewa in what is now Uttar Pradesh. Although rice found at Lahuradewa has been dated to c. 6400 BC, controversy remains over whether the rice was cultivated or simply collected wild rice.

=== West Asia ===
The 7th millennium BC saw the continuation of agricultural expansion from earlier millennium within the Fertile Crescent. It saw advances in animal husbandry, such as the domestication of pigs and cattle, which contributed to the continued adoption of mixed farming. The domestication of cattle allowed for manure to became a vital component to agricultural systems, alongside their use as beasts of burden. The immense utility and value of cattle, able to feed large groups of people, contributed significantly to social stratification in the region. The millennium also saw the transition between the Pre-Pottery Neolithic B (PPNB) and the Pottery Neolithic. The spread of pottery corresponded to significant developments in food systems. Pottery allowed for the use of cooking vessels, the processing of grain, and the invention of brewing.

==== Levant ====
In the Southern Levant, the start of the millennium saw a transition between the PPNB and a period referred to as the Pre-Pottery Neolithic C (PPNC) or Final PPNB. Short-lived in comparison to the PPNB and Pre-Pottery Neolithic A, relatively few settlements from this culture have been found in the region. Many sites, especially those west of the Jordan River, were abandoned during the transition from the PPNB to PPNC, while large, organized settlements such as Ayn Ghazal emerged in the Jordanian Highlands. These settlements and others across the Southern Levant gradually declined over the course of the first half of the millennium. Nomadic pastoralism may have originated in the Levant during this period.

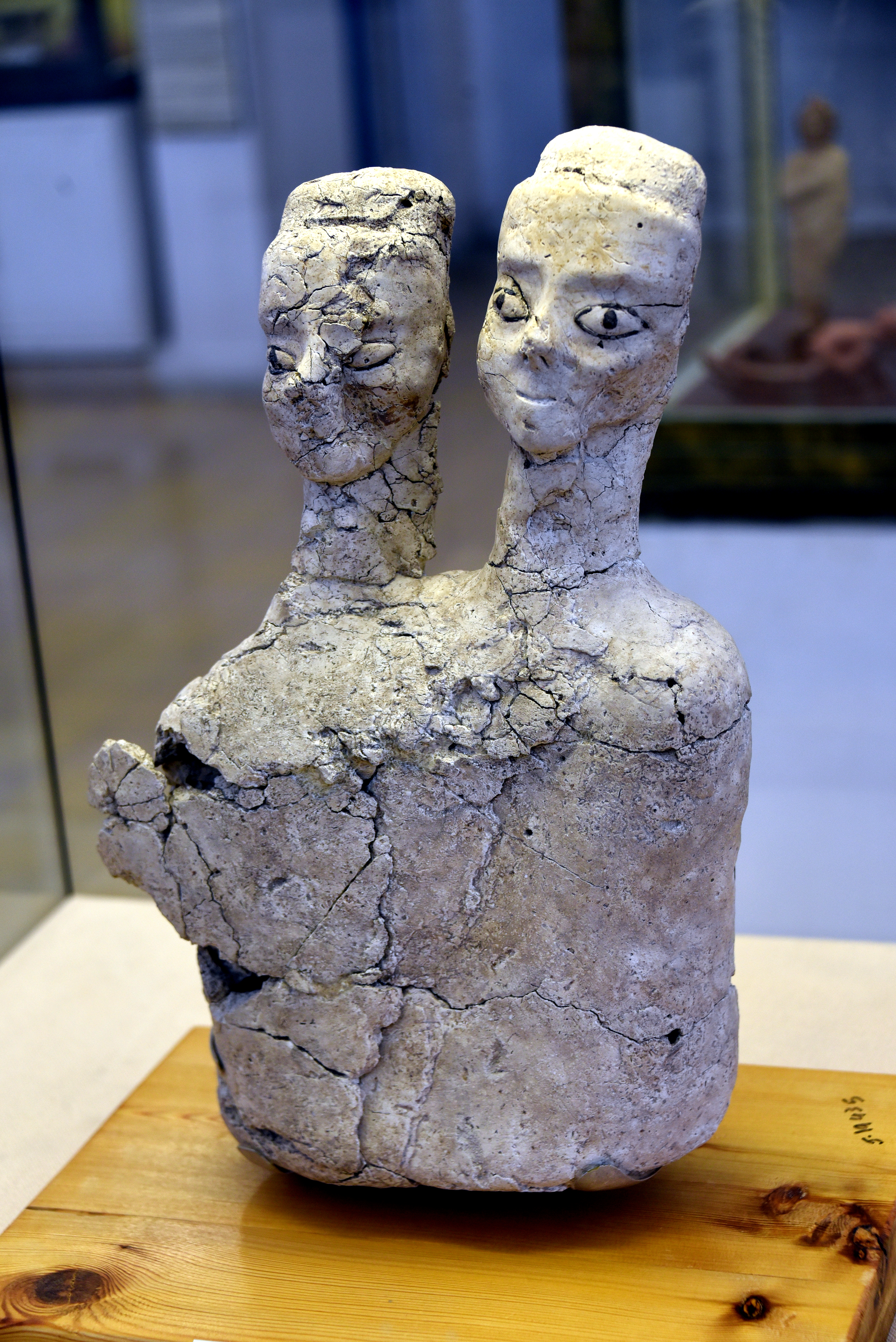
One of the Ayn Ghazal statues, from the Pre-Pottery Neolithic C site of Ayn Ghazal in what is now Jordan

Ceramics in the Southern Levant are attested from around 6500 BC, although may have existed in limited quantities during the PPNC or earlier cultures. The growth of settlements returned around 6400 BC with the Yarmukian culture, the local variety of the Pottery Neolithic. The Yarmukian saw increased settlement along the coast and low-lying areas of the Southern Levant, possibly due to milder conditions during the beginnings of a period of climate change. However, highland sites continued to be occupied until the Late Yarmukian Crisis (c. 6200), which saw the abandonment of settlements in the highlands and Jordan Valley in favor of those purely along the coastal plain and Jezreel Valley. In addition to climate effects from the 8.2-kiloyear event, heavy precipitation may have become more frequent in the region, producing floods and mudslides, destroying many Yarmukian communities.

In contrast, settlements of the Northern Levant exhibit a much stronger continuity between the PPNB and the Pottery Neolithic. Near the beginning of the 7th millennium BC, ceramic vessels began to emerge in the region, accompanied by the emergence of various new settlements in the region. These include Byblos in Lebanon and Hama, Tell Sukas, and Tell Marj in Syria. The material culture of the region during the period shows a much stronger influence from northern Mesopotamia than with the Southern Levant. Following the 8.2-kiloyear event, a number of settlements in the region were abandoned.

On Cyprus, the pre-pottery Khirokitia culture disappeared by the end of the millennium, possibly due to aridification linked to the 8.2-kiloyear event. Cyprus' population massively declined, and would ultimately not recover until the 5th millennium BC Sotira culture.

==== Mesopotamia and Iran ====
Pottery appeared as a rare item in Mesopotamia around the beginning of the millennia, before rapidly growing in popularity over the following few centuries. The people of the region occasionally decorated pottery even in its earliest period of use, but much more elaborate painted designs emerged around 6100 BC, accompanying a diversification of forms which saw the introduction of ceramic figurines and stamp seals. Native metal (not requiring smelting from ore) was in limited use in northern Mesopotamia from the 8th millennium BC onward, with evidence of copper and lead in use.

The population of northern Mesopotamia grew gradually throughout the millennium, spreading into the lowland plains between the main river valleys. Population density and settlement size remained low. House construction shifted from small circular one-room homes to larger rectangular homes with two or three rooms. Settlements also appeared in central Mesopotamia, with the emergence of Pottery Neolithic sites like Bouqras in eastern Syria and Tell es-Sawwan in central Iraq. These are associated with the Proto-Hassuna culture, characterized by a distinct form of pottery with red paint. During the second half of the millennium, shifts in pottery constructed accompanied the emergence of the Samarra culture in central Mesopotamia, the Hassuna culture in the north, and the Halaf culture in the west. These accompanied with greater specialization and social organization, alongside greater trade connections across Mesopotamia.

Pottery spread into the Iranian plateau near the beginning of the 7th millennium BC. The number of attested settlements grew massively over the period, as communities became more sedentary and reliant on cultivation and pastoralism.

== Europe and the Neolithic expansion ==
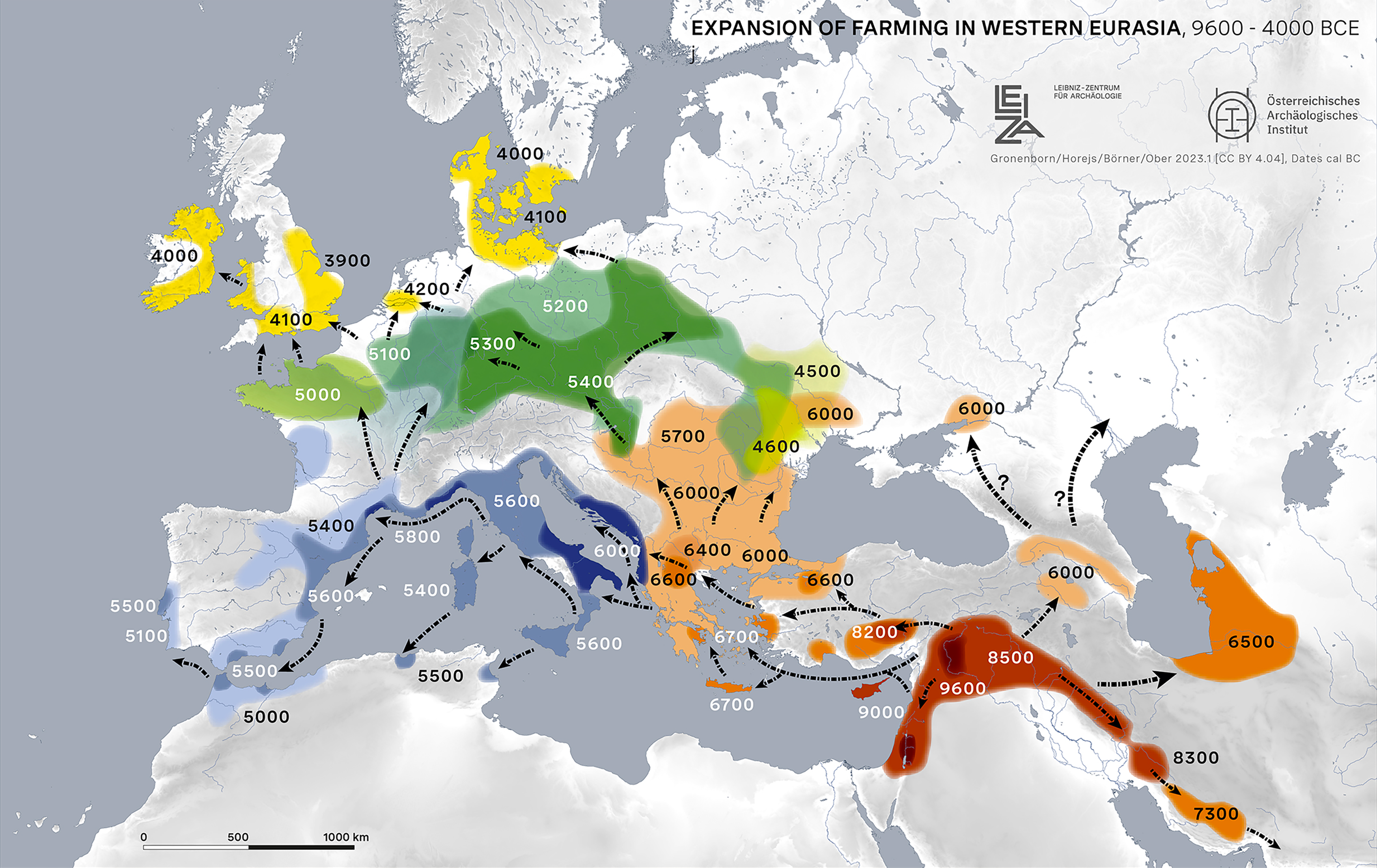
The 7th millennium saw the expansion of Neolithic agriculture out of Anatolia into much of Southern Europe.

Neolithic agriculture had been established in south-central Anatolia since around 8500 BC, characterized by sites such as Aşıklı Höyük. Agriculture was well-attested by the 7th millennium BC, with the site of Çatalhöyük being the best documented example of early Neolithic agriculture in the region. The first portion of the millennium saw the introduction of Fertile Crescent crops such as bread wheat and naked barley to the region. Around 6500 BC, domestic pigs and cattle are attested in the region, supplementing existing livestock of sheep and goats; these new animals may have been introduced from the Fertile Crescent, or separately domesticated locally. Dairy consumption became prevalent in Anatolia around this time, and alongside other improvements in agricultural practice, may have allowed farming to spread to other regions of Asia Minor. The Pottery Neolithic spread into Anatolia by the middle of the millennium. Unlike in the Southern Levant, no population disruption appears to have accompanied this transition.

The rapid expansion of Neolithic technologies and culture (a process often called Neolithization) has been attributed to two waves of maritime and land-based migration spreading out of central Anatolia. These initial Neolithic sites in the Aegean differ greatly from prior Mesolithic cultures in their material culture; however, they share strong similarities among one another due to the founder effect. Some interpretations of Neolithization place greater emphasis on the role of indigenous foragers adopting Neolithic innovations, while others focus on the influx of Neolithic settlers.

=== Aegean ===
During the early portion of the millennium, agriculture rapidly spread across western Anatolia, likely due to a combination of agricultural advancements, possible climate changes, and demographic shifts in central Anatolia to smaller autonomous communities. Sites in the Turkish Lake District, Marmara, and the eastern Aegean show a degree of regional variation and sharp distinction from earlier Mesolithic cultures. Only in the Marmara region is cultural continuity from the Mesolithic attested, with similarities in lithic technology between the Neolithic Fikirtepe culture and the earlier Agaçlı culture.

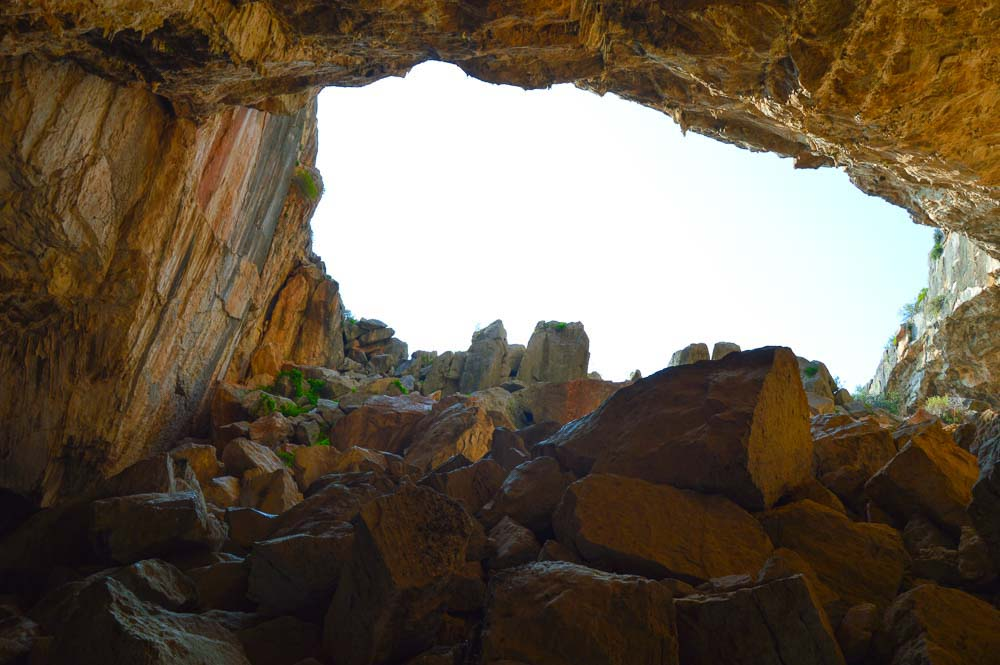
Franchthi Cave in southern Greece

Certain early Aegean sites, including Franchthi Cave in the Peloponnese, suggest the early introduction of domesticated livestock and emmer wheat near the beginning of the millennium as a local phase of the pre-pottery Neolithic. Definite signs of Neolithic culture in the southern Aegean are attested around the 6800–6600 BC in the southern Aegean, with a slightly later date of around 6600 BC in the north. Neolithic settlement on Crete began slightly before 6700 BC, while the beginning of the Neolithic was likely delayed in Thessaly and Macedonia until the 66th century BC. The spread of Neolithic culture halted from around 6500 to 6200 BC, with no evidence of expansion further into Europe.

These pioneer groups introduced cattle, sheep, pigs, and goats as livestock. Displacing hunter gatherers, the earliest Neolithic settlers in what is now Greece subsisted primarily on livestock and cultivated crops (such as grains and legumes), with very little consumption of wild plants or animals. These settlers lived in villages of around 100 people, which gradually accumulated tells (hills of waste and debris) over long periods of occupation. Very little genetic admixture has been found between these settler populations and the indigenous Mesolithic populations. The innovation of pottery in western Asia rapidly spread to these communities, becoming common along the Aegean before 6500 BC.

=== Southern and Eastern Europe ===
The previously halted process of Neolithic expansion in southeastern Europe abruptly restarted around the 62nd century BC for unclear reasons. By the 6100s BC, Neolithic agriculture began to move into the northern Balkans and the Carpathian Basin. These early settlements are linked to the Starčevo–Körös–Criș culture. At the Iron Gates of the Danube, burial sites from around 6000 BC show the Neolithic settlers buried alongside the descendants of local Mesolithic hunter-gatherers, indicating some degree of shared occupation of the region.

The last centuries of the 7th millennium BC saw farming spread along the Adriatic Sea. Cardial impressed ware pottery emerged along the southern Adriatic sometime after the 8.2-kiloyear event, evidenced by sites such as Sidari on Corfu. Neolithic farmers spread along the western coast of the Balkans in the last two centuries of the millennium, settling Dalmatia by around 6000 BC. From the western Balkans, Neolithic agriculture spread across the Adriatic into the Italian Peninsula. Although dates as early as 6200 BC have been proposed, farming likely spread into coastal Apulia slightly before 6000, before expanding along the Gulf of Taranto.

Neolithic technology, including pottery and tools, spread across Eastern European hunter-gatherer communities during the 7th millennium BC. Unlike Neolithic cultures in the Balkans, they did not adopt agriculture. Pottery finds at sites such as Rakushechny Yar on the Don River possibly suggest cultural and technological diffusion from West Asia. The Bug–Dniester culture emerged in what is now Moldova and western Ukraine around the end of the millennium, possibly due to local foraging populations adopting agriculture. In the plains of what is now Poland, Belarus, and northwestern Ukraine, Mesolithic hunter-gatherers associated with various lithic cultures lived in low population densities, with evidence of cultural diffusion from the Baltic Sea coasts.

=== Northern and Western Europe ===
Much of Western Europe along the Atlantic coast saw a change of settlement patterns in the last centuries of the 7th millennium BC, upon which archaeologists delineate the Early and Late Mesolithic periods. In northern France, the Late Mesolithic saw hunter-gatherers occupy the large coastal islands which had become separated from the mainland. While minimal change of settlement patterns is evident in northern Spain, groups in Portugal migrated to the estuaries of major rivers from other coastal areas.

Mesolithic hunter-gatherers also inhabited the British Isles during the 7th millennium BC, with some sites showing evidence of persistent use and timber constructions over hundreds of years. In Great Britain, characteristic "narrow-bladed" microliths continued to be in use throughout the millennium, while Ireland saw the introduction of polished-stone axes into the archaeological record. The retreat of glacial ice allowed for the human settlement of Scotland by 6600 BC at the latest. Seal bones began to appear at sites in inland Scandinavia during the 7th millennium BC, suggesting either migration or trade connections with the coast.

== Africa ==
=== North Africa ===
In the portions of the Maghreb around what is now Tunisia, the Capsian tradition continued a hunter-gatherer tradition during the 7th millennium BC. The Caspian peoples are identified through their rammadiyat or escargotières, open-air middens with significant ash and snail-shell remains. Near the end of the millennium, the changing climate led the culture to expand westward into what is now Algeria.

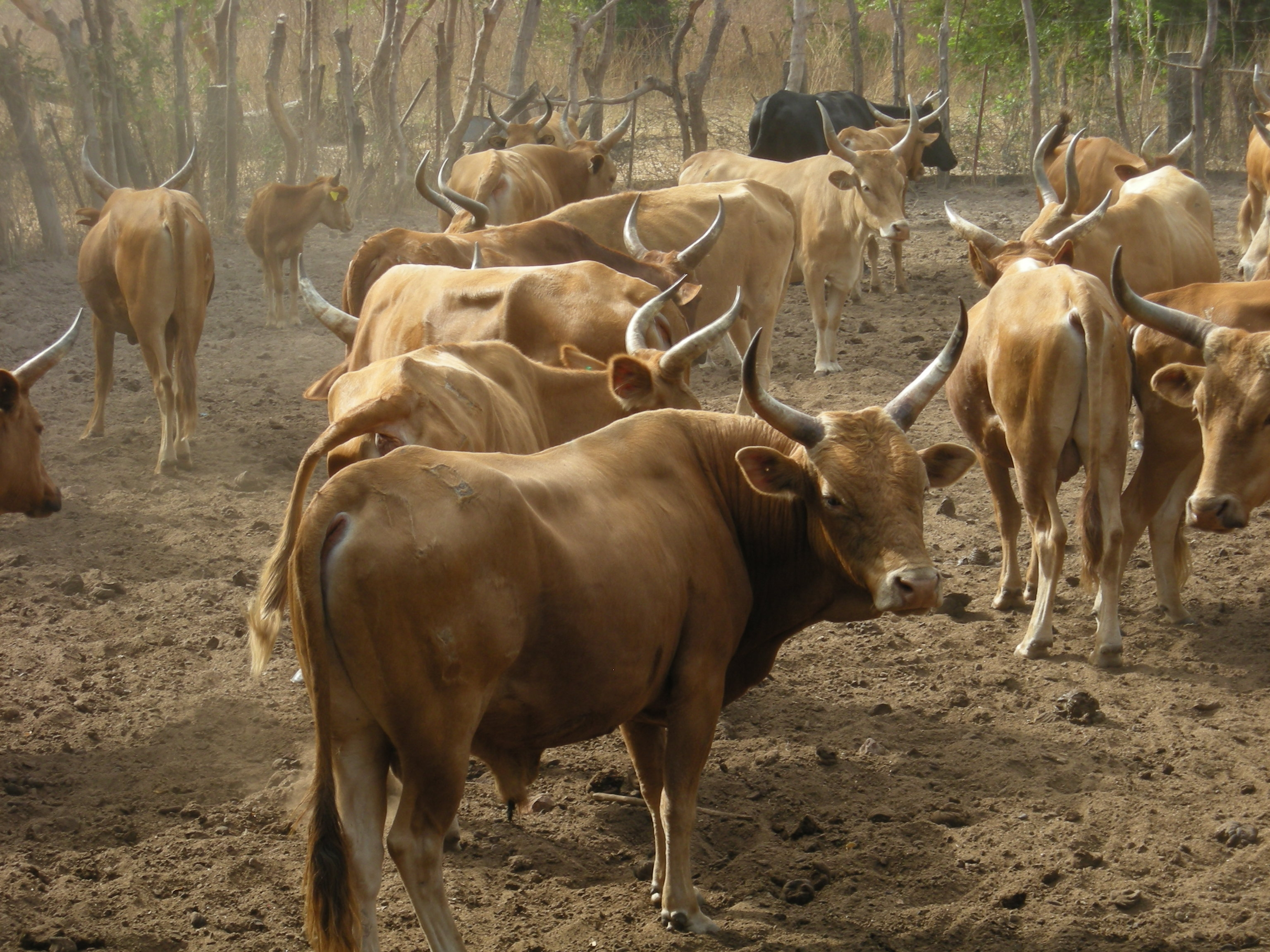
The domesticated ancestors of African Sanga cattle may date to the 7th millennium BC.

Communities emerged around Khartoum in what is now Sudan near the beginning of the 7th millennium BC, making pottery, but relying on hunting and fishing. By around 6000 BC, animal husbandry and pastoralism began to spread into southern Egypt, with cattle bones from Nabta Playa dating to around the end of the millennium. Some archaeologists have proposed that Sanga (African cattle breeds) were domesticated in North Africa by the 7th millennium BC, drawing on physical and genetic differences between Asian and African cattle. The exact origin of cattle in Africa remains tenuous due to a lack of archaeological evidence.

Contrary to earlier archaeological theories, the diffusion of livestock into the region appears to have begun in southern Egypt before spreading into northern Egypt and the Nile Delta. Northern Egypt shows very little sign of human settlement during the 7th millennium BC, except for small Epipaleolithic fishing communities at Elkab (the Elkabian culture) and Faiyum (the Qarunian culture). The Dakhla Oasis in western Egypt shows signs of sedentary foragers, but not of livestock. Unlike the Neolithic cultures, communities in North Africa adopted pottery before the introduction of agriculture. Pottery was in use across the central and eastern Sahara by the 7th millennium BC.

=== Sub-Saharan Africa ===
In the Great Rift Valley of Kenya, groups associated with the Eburran tool industry returned to the basin of Lake Nakuru after several millennia of absence due to climate effects. To the north, groups around Lake Turkana made use of harpoons by the 7th millennium BC, although their initial use may date to as far back as the 16th millennium BC. They left some scarce evidence of pottery usage in the region by the end of the 7th millennium BC, decorating it with wavy lines.

Late Stone Age populations in what is now South Africa had largely abandoned the Karoo and other arid interior regions in favor of the Western Cape and Eastern Cape during the latter half of the previous millennium. During the 7th millennium BC, hunter-gatherer groups in the Cape region moved further and more frequently than in previous millennia, likely indicating greater population density and crowding.

== The Americas ==
The 7th millennium BC saw the earliest stages of the transition to agriculture in Mesoamerica, as migratory hunter-gatherer populations began cultivating pepo squash, chili peppers, avocados, and the precursors of maize. Fully sedentary agriculture would not emerge for several millennia. By the end of the millennium, populations across tropical South America combined traditional hunting and foraging with horticulture, tending to plants and clearing patches of forest to allow for their growth. Crops including squashes, avocados, cassava, peppers, calabash, and quinoa were utilized, although hunting was still the primary source of food.
