= 6200 =

6200 is a natural number in the 6001-6999 range, and a harmonic divisor number.

It can also refer to:

- 6200 BC, a century in the 7th millennium BC
- AD 6200, the year in the 7th millennium
- 6200 BC event, a period of major climatic change
- Nvidia's 6200GT graphics processing unit
- 6200 Hachinohe, a main belt asteroid
- PRR 6200, a steam turbine locomotive of the Pennsylvania Railroad
- LMS 6200, a Princess Royal Class steam locomotive of the London Midland and Scottish Railway
