= Piora Oscillation =

Abrupt cold and wet period in the Holocene Epoch

Holocene Temperature Variations

The Piora Oscillations are two cold periods in the Alpine climate history of the Holocene Epoch. Piora 1-O. is dated by Heinz Zoller (cited still as Raw-BP by Conradin A. Burga) to -5300 to -5000 conv. BP, only calibrated here from 4138 ± 113 to 3796 ± 109 BC. Piora 2-O. is dated to -4800 to -4400 conv. BP, calibrated both ends using OxCal 4.4 (Christopher Bronk Ramsey) from 3569 ±119 to 3081 ±150 BC.

The phenomenon is named after the Val Piora (Piora Valley) in Switzerland, where it was first detected.

The water level of Lake Constance in the Alps show a considerable history of variations as reconstructed from sediment and pollen analysis. In 5,375 BP (3,375 BCE) there occurred an abrupt rise in lake level at the archaeological site of Arbon-Bleiche 3, indicating a cooling of the temperatures. This caused an abandonment of this prehistoric lake-shore location.

== See also ==
- Bond event
- 4.2-kiloyear event
- Bølling–Allerød warming
- African humid period
- Older Peron
