= Holocene climatic optimum =

Global warm period around 9,000–5,000 years ago

The Holocene Climate Optimum (HCO) was a warm period in the first half of the Holocene epoch, that occurred in the interval roughly 9,500 to 5,500 years BP, with a thermal maximum around 8000 years BP. It has also been known by many other names, such as Altithermal, Climatic Optimum, Holocene Megathermal, Holocene Optimum, Holocene Thermal Maximum, Holocene global thermal maximum, Hypsithermal, and Mid-Holocene Warm Period.

The warm period was followed by a gradual decline, of about 0.1 to 0.3 °C per millennium, until about two centuries ago. However, on a sub-millennial scale, there were regional warm periods superimposed on this decline.

- For other temperature fluctuations, see temperature record.
- For other past climate fluctuation, see paleoclimatology.
- For the pollen zone and Blytt–Sernander period, associated with the climate optimum, see Atlantic (period).

== Global effects ==
Global mean surface temperature over the past 12,000 years from published proxy reconstructions, relative to 1850-1900. Dashed markers are regional proxies. The instrumental marker is a separate decadal mean, not part of any reconstruction.

The HCO was approximately 4.9 °C warmer than the Last Glacial Maximum. A study in 2020 estimated that the average global temperature during the warmest 200 year period of the HCO, around 6,500 years ago, was around 0.7 °C warmer than the mean for nineteenth century AD, immediately before the Industrial Revolution, and 0.3 °C cooler than the average for 2011–2019. The 2021 IPCC report expressed medium confidence that temperatures in the last decade are higher than they were in the Mid-Holocene Warm Period. Temperatures in the Northern Hemisphere are simulated to be warmer than present average during the summers, but the tropics and parts of the Southern Hemisphere were colder than average. The average temperature change appears to have declined rapidly with latitude and so essentially no change in mean temperature is reported at low and middle latitudes. Tropical reefs tend to show temperature increases of less than 1 °C. The tropical ocean surface at the Great Barrier Reef about 5350 years ago was 1 °C warmer and enriched in ^{18}O by 0.5 per mil relative to modern seawater.

Temperatures during the HCO were higher than in the present by around 6 °C in Svalbard, near the North Pole.

Of 140 sites across the western Arctic, there is clear evidence for conditions that were warmer than now at 120 sites. At 16 sites for which quantitative estimates have been obtained, local temperatures were on average 1.6±0.8 °C higher during the optimum than now. Northwestern North America reached peak warmth first, from 11,000 to 9,000 years ago, but the Laurentide Ice Sheet still chilled eastern Canada. Northeastern North America experienced peak warming 4,000 years later. Along the Arctic Coastal Plain in Alaska, there are indications of summer temperatures 2–3 °C warmer than now. Research indicates that the Arctic had less sea ice than now. The Greenland Ice Sheet thinned, particularly at its margins. Areas like Prudhoe Dome were ice-free. In addition to being warmer, Arctic Alaska also became wetter.

Northwestern Europe experienced warming, but there was cooling in Southern Europe. In the southwestern Iberian Peninsula, forest cover reached its peak between 9,760 and 7,360 years BP as a result of high moisture availability and warm temperatures during the HCO. In Central Europe, the HCO was when human impact on the environment first became clearly detectable in sedimentological records, with the portion of the HCO from 9,000 to 7,500 BP being associated with minimal human impact and environmental stability, the portion from 7,500 to 6,300 BP with human impact only observed in pollen records, and the portion after 6,300 BP with substantial human influence on the environment. Northeastern Poland became wetter due to increased precipitation.

In Anatolia, there is little isotopic evidence for a distinct HCO, suggesting that its impact was minimal in this region. In the Middle East, the HCO was associated with frost-free winters and abundant Pistacia savannas. It was during this interval that the domestication of cereals and Neolithic population growth occurred in the region.

The onset of the HCO in the southern Ural Mountains was simultaneous with that in Northern Europe, while its termination occurred between 6,300 and 5,100 BP. Winter warming of 3 to 9 °C and summer warming of 2 to 6 °C occurred in northern central Siberia.

The HCO was highly asynchronous in Central and East Asia, though it at least occurred contemporaneously in the Loess Plateau, the Inner Mongolian Plateau, and Xinjiang. As a result of rising sea levels and decay of ice sheets in the Northern Hemisphere, the East Asian Summer Monsoon (EASM) rain belt expanded to the northwest, penetrating deep into the Asian interior. The EASM, being significantly weaker before and after the HCO, peaked in strength during this interval, though the exact timing of its maximum intensity varied by region; intensified westerlies occasionally caused dry spells in China during the HCO. Current desert regions of Central Asia were extensively forested because of higher rainfall, and the warm temperate forest belts in China and Japan were extended northwards. In the Yarlung Tsangpo valley of southern Tibet, precipitation was up to twice as high as it is today during the middle Holocene. In the Huai River basin, the HCO began 9,100 to 8,000 BP. Pollen records from Lake Tai in Jiangsu, China shed light on increased summer precipitation and a warmer and wetter overall climate in the region. The stability of the Middle Holocene climate in China fostered the development of agriculture and animal husbandry in the region. In the Korean Peninsula, arboreal pollen records the HCO as occurring from 8,900 to 4,400 BP, with its core period being 7,600 to 4,800 BP. Sea levels in the Sea of Japan were 2–6 metres higher than in the present, with sea surface temperatures being 1–2 °C higher. The East Korea Warm Current reached as far as Primorye and pushed cold water off of the cooler Primorsky Current to the northeast. The Tsushima Current warmed the northern shores of Hokkaido penetrated into the Sea of Okhotsk. In the northern South China Sea, the HCO was associated with colder winters due to a stronger East Asian Winter Monsoon (EAWM), causing frequent coral die-offs.

In the Indian Subcontinent, the Indian Summer Monsoon (ISM) heavily intensified, creating a hot and wet climate in India along with high sea levels.

Relative sea level in the Spermonde Archipelago was approximately 0.5 metres higher than it is today. Sedimentary infill of lagoons was retarded by the sea level highstand and accelerated after the HCO, when sea levels dropped.

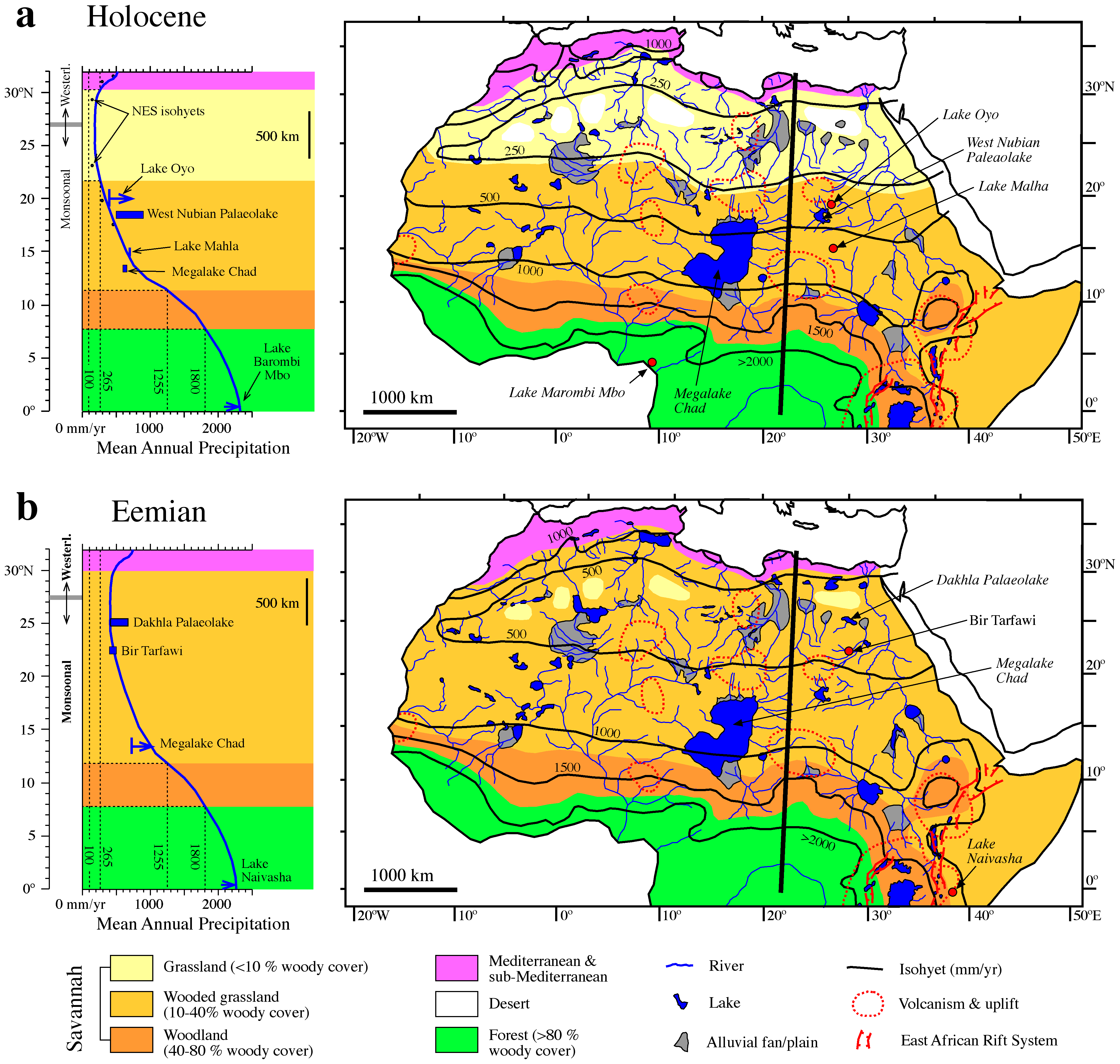
Vegetation and water bodies in northern and central Africa in the Eemian (bottom) and Holocene (top)

West African sediments additionally record the African humid period, an interval between 16,000 and 6,000 years ago during which Africa was much wetter than now. That was caused by a strengthening of the African monsoon by changes in summer radiation, which resulted from long-term variations in the Earth's orbit around the Sun. The "Green Sahara" was dotted with numerous lakes, containing typical African lake crocodile and hippopotamus fauna. A curious discovery from the marine sediments is that the transitions into and out of the wet period occurred within decades, not the previously-thought extended periods. It is hypothesized that humans played a role in altering the vegetation structure of North Africa at some point after 8,000 years ago by introducing domesticated animals, which contributed to the rapid transition to the arid conditions that are now found in many locations in the Sahara. Further south, in Central Africa, the savannas that make up the coastal lowlands of the Congo River drainage basin in the present were entirely absent. Southwestern Africa experienced increased humidity during the HCO.

Northwestern Patagonia, in a region known as the Arid Diagonal, was significantly drier during the Early and Middle Holocene, with the region becoming more humid during the Late Holocene following the end of the HCO.

In the far Southern Hemisphere (New Zealand and Antarctica), the warmest period during the Holocene appears to have been roughly 10,500 to 8,000 years ago, immediately after the end of the last ice age. The Amery Ice Shelf retreated approximately 80 kilometres landward during this warm interval. By 6,000 years ago, which is normally associated with the Holocene Climatic Optimum in the Northern Hemisphere, those regions had reached temperatures similar to today, and they did not participate in the temperature changes of the north. However, some authors have used the term "Holocene Climatic Optimum" to describe the earlier southern warm period as well; typically, the term "Early Holocene Climatic Optimum" is used for the Southern Hemisphere warm interval.

In New Zealand, the HCO was associated with a 2 °C temperature gradient across the subtropical front (STF), a sharp contrast with the 6 °C observed today. Westerly winds in New Zealand were reduced.

== Comparison of ice cores ==
A comparison of the delta profiles at Byrd Station, West Antarctica (2164 m ice core recovered, 1968), and Camp Century, Northwest Greenland, shows the post-glacial climatic optimum. Points of correlation indicate that in both locations, the HCO (post-glacial climatic optimum) probably occurred at the same time. A similar comparison is evident between the Dye 3 1979 and the Camp Century 1963 cores regarding this period.

The Hans Tausen Ice Cap, in Peary Land (northern Greenland), was drilled in 1977, with a new deep drill to 325 m. The ice core contained distinct melt layers all the way to the bedrock. That indicates that Hans Tausen Iskappe contains no ice from the last glaciation and so the world's northernmost ice cap melted away during the post-glacial climatic optimum and was rebuilt when the climate cooled some 4000 years ago.

From the delta-profile, the Renland ice cap in the Scoresby Sound has always been separated from the inland ice, but all of the delta-leaps revealed in the Camp Century 1963 core recurred in the Renland 1985 ice core. The Renland ice core from East Greenland apparently covers a full glacial cycle from the Holocene into the previous Eemian interglacial. The Renland ice core is 325 m long.

Although the depths are different, the GRIP and NGRIP cores also contain the climatic optimum at very similar times.

== Milankovitch cycles ==
Milankovitch cycles.

The climatic event was probably a result of predictable changes in the Earth's orbit (Milankovitch cycles) and a continuation of changes that caused the end of the last glacial period.

The effect would have had the maximum heating of the Northern Hemisphere 9,000 years ago, when the axial tilt was 24° and the nearest approach to the Sun (perihelion) was during the Northern Hemisphere's summer. The calculated Milankovitch Forcing would have provided 0.2% more solar radiation (+40 W/m^{2}) to the Northern Hemisphere in summer, which tended to cause more heating. There seems to have been the predicted southward shift in the global band of thunderstorms, the Intertropical Convergence Zone.

However, orbital forcing would predict maximum climate response several thousand years earlier than those observed in the Northern Hemisphere. The delay may be a result of the continuing changes in climate, as the Earth emerged from the last glacial period and related to ice–albedo feedback. Different sites often show climate changes at somewhat different times and lasting for different durations. At some locations, climate changes may have begun as early as 11,000 years ago or have persisted until 4,000 years ago. As noted above, the warmest interval in the far south significantly preceded warming in the north.

== Other changes ==
Significant temperature changes do not appear to have occurred at most low-latitude sites, but other climate changes have been reported, such as significantly wetter conditions in Africa, Australia and Japan and desert-like conditions in the Midwestern United States. Areas around the Amazon show temperature increases and drier conditions.

== See also ==
- 8.2-kiloyear event – Rapid global cooling about 8,200 years ago
- Hockey stick graph (global temperature) – Graph in climate science
- Little Ice Age – Climatic cooling after the Medieval Warm Period (16th–19th centuries)
- Medieval Warm Period – North Atlantic regional climate era, c. 950 - c. 1250
- Next glacial maximum – Series of alternating glacial and interglacial periods
- Timeline of environmental history
- Younger Dryas – Time period c. 12,900–11,700 years ago
