= Meghalayan =

Third stage of the Holocene epoch

- 0.0042 – 0 Ma

Chronology
← / Y2K; ← / Year 0; ← / 4.2 kiloyear event; ← / 8.2 kiloyear event
Subdivision of the Holocene according to the ICS, as of 2024. Vertical axis scale: Gregorian years

Etymology
- Name formality: Formal
- Name ratified: June 14, 2018

Usage information
- Celestial body: Earth
- Regional usage: Global (ICS)
- Time scale(s) used: ICS Time Scale

Definition
- Chronological unit: Age
- Stratigraphic unit: Stage
- Time span formality: Formal
- Lower boundary definition: 4.2-kiloyear event
- Lower boundary GSSP: Mawmluh Cave, Meghalaya, India; 25.2622°N 91.7150°E
- Lower GSSP ratified: June 14, 2018
- Upper boundary definition: Ongoing
- Upper boundary GSSP: N/A
- Upper GSSP ratified: N/A

The Meghalayan age is the current age or latest geologic age – or uppermost stage of the Quaternary. It was given the name in 2018, by the International Commission on Stratigraphy. It is also the upper, or latest, of three subdivisions of the Holocene epoch or series. This way of breaking down time is based only on geology; for example, it is unrelated to the three-age system of historical periods into which human development is sometimes divided.

== Timeline ==
The Meghalayan begins 4,200 years BP (c. 2251 BCE or 7750 HE). Helama & Oinonen (2019) dated the start of the Meghalayan to 2190–1990 BCE. The age began with a 200-year drought that impacted human civilizations in the Eastern Mediterranean, Mesopotamia, the Indus Valley and the Yangtze River Valley.

== Origins ==
This age is named after the Northeast Indian state of Meghalaya, where the stalagmite was found that is used to mark out its years.

The International Commission on Stratigraphy officially ratified this age in June 2018, along with the earlier Greenlandian and Northgrippian ages/stages. Its Global Boundary Stratotype Section and Point (GSSP) is a Krem Mawmluh Cave formation in Meghalaya. Mawmluh cave is one of the longest and deepest caves in India, and conditions there were suitable for preserving chemical signs of the transition in ages. The global auxiliary stratotype is an ice core from Mount Logan in Canada.

== IUGS geological heritage site ==
In respect of the Mawmluh Cave site being the "GSSP of the youngest unit of the geologic time scale associated with dramatic climate changes with implications on human civilisation," the International Union of Geological Sciences (IUGS) included the GSSP of the Meghalayan Stage in the Mawmluh Cave in its assemblage of 100 "geological heritage sites" around the world in a listing published in October 2022. The organisation defines an IUGS Geological Heritage Site as "a key place with geological elements and/or processes of international scientific relevance, used as a reference, and/or with a substantial contribution to the development of geological sciences through history."

== See also ==
- Geologic time scale
- 4.2-kiloyear event
