= Northgrippian =

Second stage of the Holocene epoch

- 0.0082 – 0.0042 Ma

Chronology
← / Y2K; ← / Year 0; ← / 4.2 kiloyear event; ← / 8.2 kiloyear event
Subdivision of the Holocene according to the ICS, as of 2024. Vertical axis scale: Gregorian years

Etymology
- Name formality: Formal
- Name ratified: 14 June 2018

Usage information
- Celestial body: Earth
- Regional usage: Global (ICS)
- Time scale(s) used: ICS Time Scale

Definition
- Chronological unit: Age
- Stratigraphic unit: Stage
- Time span formality: Formal
- Lower boundary definition: 8.2 kiloyear event
- Lower boundary GSSP: NGRIP1 ice core, Greenland; 75.1000°N 42.3200°W
- Lower GSSP ratified: 14 June 2018
- Upper boundary definition: 4.2 kiloyear event
- Upper boundary GSSP: Mawmluh Cave, Meghalaya, India; 25.2622°N 91.7150°E
- Upper GSSP ratified: 14 June 2018

In the geologic time scale, the Northgrippian is the middle of three ages or stages of the Holocene Epoch or Series. It was officially ratified by the International Commission on Stratigraphy in June 2018, along with the earlier Greenlandian and later Meghalayan ages/stages. The age takes its name from the North Greenland Ice Core Project (NorthGRIP). The age began 8,276 BP (6326 BCE), near the 8.2-kiloyear event, and goes up to the start of the Meghalayan, which began 4,200 BP (2251 BCE), near the 4.2-kiloyear event.

== Stratotype ==
The Global Boundary Stratotype Section and Point (GSSP) defining the base of the Northgrippian is an ice core collected by the North Greenland Ice Core Project (NorthGRIP or NGRIP) from a drill site near central Greenland, located at coordinates 75°06′N, 42°19′W. The GSSP, from drill hole NGRIP1, represents the one-time temperature drop recorded during the 8.2 kiloyear event.

== Climate ==
Diagram of temperatures during the Holocene

After the relative drop in temperatures linked to the 8.2-kiloyear event, the climate warmed up again and reached the highest temperatures recorded during the Holocene. The first part of the Northgrippian thus corresponded to the Holocene climatic optimum, despite some minor fluctuations during the period. Around 2250 BC, the 4.2-kiloyear event was accompanied by a further temporary drop in temperatures, marking the end of the Northgrippian and the beginning of the Meghalayan Age.

The Holocene climatic optimum led to variations in air masses and a shift in precipitation zones compared to the present period. The extent of the polar ice caps was then at its minimum recorded during the Holocene.

== Paleofauna ==
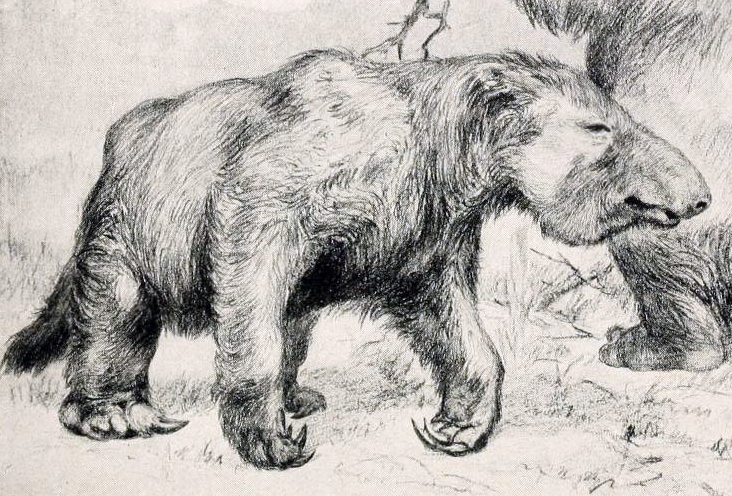
A sketch of Megatherium americanum, the Giant Sloth.

The giant ground sloth, Megatherium americanum, weighing up to 4 tons and measuring up to 6 m in length from head to tail, was one of the largest known land mammals found in Argentina, before going extinct at around 5370 BC. Similarly, the large deer Megaloceros giganteus became extinct in the Urals and western Siberia at around 4866 BC.

== Prehistory ==
The Northgrippian was a period during which many regions of the world transitioned from a predatory economy to a production economy, based on agriculture and livestock rearing, thus marking their entry into the Stone Age's Neolithic period. Only six to eight regions of the planet are considered to have independently invented agriculture. Elsewhere, technologies and lifestyles spread gradually from the first agricultural centers. At the end of the Northgrippian, few regions of Eurasia still had a hunter-gatherer way of life.

== See also ==
- Geologic time scale
- North Greenland Ice Core Project
- 5th millennium BC
- 6th millennium BC
