= Greenlandian =

First age of the Holocene epoch

- 0.0117 – 0.0082 Ma

Chronology
← / Y2K; ← / Year 0; ← / 4.2 kiloyear event; ← / 8.2 kiloyear event
Subdivision of the Holocene according to the ICS, as of 2024. Vertical axis scale: Gregorian years

Etymology
- Name formality: Formal
- Name ratified: 14 June 2018

Usage information
- Celestial body: Earth
- Regional usage: Global (ICS)
- Time scale(s) used: ICS Time Scale

Definition
- Chronological unit: Age
- Stratigraphic unit: Stage
- Time span formality: Formal
- Lower boundary definition: End of the Younger Dryas stadial
- Lower boundary GSSP: NGRIP2 ice core, Greenland; 75.1000°N 42.3200°W
- Lower GSSP ratified: 14 June 2018 (as base of Greenlandian)
- Upper boundary definition: 8.2 kiloyear event
- Upper boundary GSSP: NGRIP1 ice core, Greenland; 75.1000°N 42.3200°W
- Upper GSSP ratified: 14 June 2018

In the geologic time scale, the Greenlandian is the earliest age or lowest stage of the Holocene Epoch or Series, part of the Quaternary. Beginning in 11,650 BP (9701 BCE or 300 HE) and ending with the 8.2-kiloyear event (c. 8200–8300 BP, 6200–6300 BCE, 3600–3700 HE), it is the earliest of three sub-divisions of the Holocene. It was officially ratified by the International Commission on Stratigraphy in June 2018 with the later Northgrippian and Meghalayan Ages/Stages. The lower boundary of the Greenlandian Age is the GSSP sample from the North Greenland Ice Core Project in central Greenland (75.1000°N 42.3200°W). The Greenlandian GSSP has been correlated with the end of Younger Dryas (from near-glacial to interglacial) and a "shift in lower deuterium excess values".

Diagram of temperatures during the Holocene

After the sudden rise in temperatures marking the end of the Late Pleistocene, global warming continued at a slightly more moderate pace during the Greenlandian. It was interrupted at the end of the period by the 8.2 kiloyear event, where the world experienced a relative drop in temperature. This isolated climate fluctuation was used to define the boundary between the Greenlandian and Northgrippian ages.

Global warming led to a rapid rise in sea levels, which engulfed vast regions that were once landforms and transformed portions of continents into islands. Affected areas include the British Isles, the Indonesian islands, and New Guinea and Tasmania, cut off from Europe, Southeast Asia, and Australia respectively. Additionally, the Beringian land bridge was submerged by these rising levels, forming the Bering Strait and separating Asia from the Americas.

== Paleofauna ==
Many species of megafauna became extinct during the Greenlandian, continuing the rate of extinctions from the end of the Late Pleistocene. These extinctions collectively constituted the Late Pleistocene extinction event.

== Prehistory ==
In the Eurasian continent, the beginning of the Greenlandian paved the way for the Mesolithic period, which generally continued until the beginning of the Northgrippian age. In the Near East, agriculture and livestock farming emerged during the Greenlandian age, marking the beginning of the Neolithic period.

== See also ==
- Geologic time scale
- 8th millennium BC
- 9th millennium BC
