= Holocene =

Current geological epoch

- 0.0117 – 0 Ma
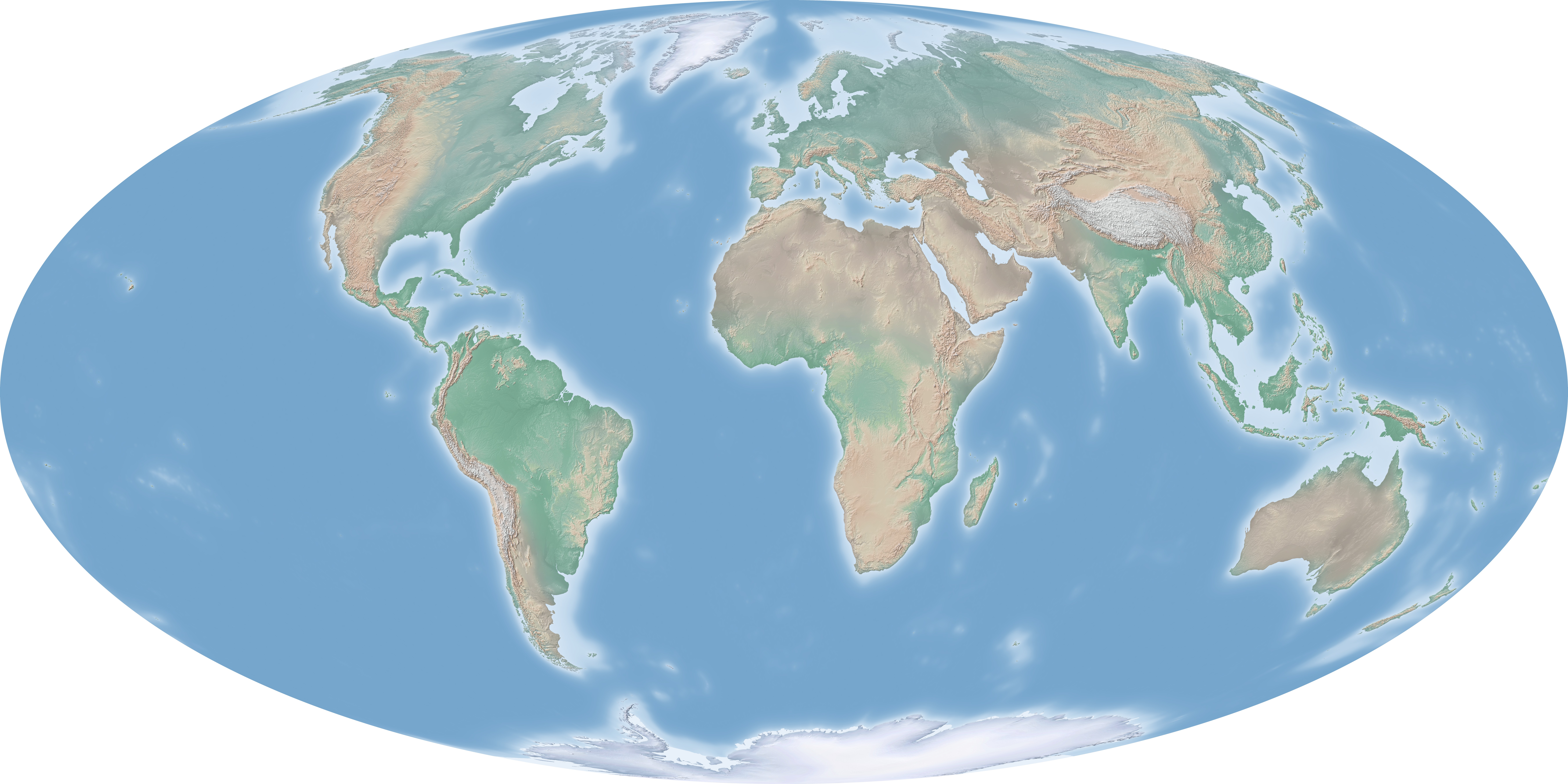
- Map of Earth as it appears during the Holocene Epoch, Meghalayan Age

Chronology
← / Y2K; ← / Year 0; ← / 4.2 kiloyear event; ← / 8.2 kiloyear event
Subdivision of the Holocene according to the ICS, as of 2024. Vertical axis scale: Gregorian years

Etymology
- Name formality: Formal

Usage information
- Celestial body: Earth
- Regional usage: Global (ICS)
- Time scale(s) used: ICS Time Scale

Definition
- Chronological unit: Epoch
- Stratigraphic unit: Series
- Time span formality: Formal
- Lower boundary definition: End of the Younger Dryas stadial.
- Lower boundary GSSP: NGRIP2 ice core, Greenland; 75.1000°N 42.3200°W
- Lower GSSP ratified: 2008
- Upper boundary definition: Present day
- Upper boundary GSSP: N/A; N/A
- Upper GSSP ratified: N/A

The Holocene (/ˈhɒl.əsiːn, -oʊ-, ˈhoʊ.lə-, -loʊ-/) is the current geological epoch, beginning approximately 11,700 years ago. It follows the Last Glacial Period, which concluded with the Holocene glacial retreat. The Holocene, together with the preceding Pleistocene, form the Quaternary period. The Holocene is an interglacial period within the ongoing glacial cycles of the Quaternary, and is equivalent to Marine Isotope Stage 1.

The Holocene correlates with the last maximum axial tilt towards the Sun of the Earth's obliquity. The Holocene corresponds with the rapid proliferation, growth, and impacts of the human species worldwide, hence the Holocene is often commonly referred to as the Age of Humans, including all of its written history, technological revolutions, development of major civilizations, and overall significant transition towards urban living in the present. The human impact on modern-era Earth and its ecosystems may be considered of global significance for the future evolution of living species, including approximately synchronous lithospheric evidence, or more recently hydrospheric and atmospheric evidence of the human impact.

Following the extinction of most large terrestrial mammals outside of Africa during the preceding Late Pleistocene, the ecosystems of the Holocene continued to be impacted by extinctions (the ongoing Holocene extinction), largely of human causation.

In July 2018, the International Union of Geological Sciences split the Holocene Epoch into three distinct ages based on the climate, Greenlandian (11,700 years ago to 8,200 years ago), Northgrippian (8,200 years ago to 4,200 years ago) and Meghalayan (4,200 years ago to the present), as proposed by the International Commission on Stratigraphy. The oldest age, the Greenlandian, was characterized by a warming following the preceding ice age or period. The Northgrippian Age is known for vast cooling due to a disruption in ocean circulations that was caused by the melting of glaciers. The most recent age of the Holocene is the present Meghalayan, which began with extreme drought that lasted around 200 years.

== Etymology ==
The word "Holocene" combines the Ancient Greek works ὅλος (hólos, "whole") and καινός (kainós, "new" or "recent"), referring to an epoch that is "wholly new"; it was proposed in 1850 by the French palaeontologist and entomologist Paul Gervais. Καινός is used as the -cene suffix for all the seven epochs of the Cenozoic (meaning "Newlife") Era, and as the Era's own prefix, being it is the newest and latest geological era.

== Overview ==
The International Commission on Stratigraphy has defined the Holocene as starting approximately 11,700 years before 2000 CE (11,650 cal years BP, or 9,700 BCE). The Subcommission on Quaternary Stratigraphy (SQS) regards the term 'recent' as an incorrect way of referring to the Holocene, preferring the term 'modern' instead to describe current processes. It also observes that the term 'Flandrian' may be used as a synonym for Holocene, although it is becoming outdated. The International Commission on Stratigraphy, however, considers the Holocene to be an epoch following the Pleistocene and specifically following the last glacial period. Local names for the last glacial period include the Wisconsinan in North America, the Weichselian in Europe, the Devensian in Britain, the Llanquihue in Chile and the Otiran in New Zealand.

The Holocene can be subdivided into five time intervals, or chronozones, based on climatic fluctuations:

Time intervals of the Holocene
Chronozone	Interval (ka BP)	
Chronozone	From	To
Preboreal	10	9
Boreal	9	8
Atlantic	8	5
Subboreal	5	2.5
Subatlantic	2.5	Present.

Note: "ka BP" means "kilo-annum Before Present", i.e. thousands of years before 1950 (non-calibrated C14 dates)

Geologists working in different regions are studying sea levels, peat bogs, and ice-core samples, using a variety of methods, with a view toward further verifying and refining the Blytt–Sernander sequence. This is a classification of climatic periods initially defined by plant remains in peat mosses. Though the method was once thought to be of little interest, based on ^{14}C dating of peats that was inconsistent with the claimed chronozones, investigators have found a general correspondence across Eurasia and North America. The scheme was defined for Northern Europe, but the climate changes were claimed to occur more widely. The periods of the scheme include a few of the final pre-Holocene oscillations of the last glacial period and then classify climates of more recent prehistory.

Paleontologists have not defined any faunal stages for the Holocene. If subdivision is necessary, periods of human technological development, such as the Mesolithic, Neolithic, and Bronze Age, are usually used. However, the time periods referenced by these terms vary with the emergence of those technologies in different parts of the world.

Some scholars have argued that a third epoch of the Quaternary, the Anthropocene, has now begun. This term has been used to denote the present time-interval in which many geologically significant conditions and processes have been profoundly altered by human activities. The 'Anthropocene' (a term coined by Paul J. Crutzen and Eugene Stoermer in 2000) was never a formally defined geological unit. The Subcommission on Quaternary Stratigraphy (SQS) of the International Commission on Stratigraphy (ICS) had a working group to determine whether it should be. In May 2019, members of the working group voted in favour of recognizing the Anthropocene as formal chrono-stratigraphic unit, with stratigraphic signals around the mid-twentieth century CE as its base. The exact criteria were still to be determined, after which the recommendation also had to be approved by the working group's parent bodies (ultimately the International Union of Geological Sciences). In March 2024, after 15 years of deliberation, the Anthropocene Epoch proposal of the working group was voted down by a wide margin by the SQS, owing largely to its shallow sedimentary record and extremely recent proposed start date. The ICS and the International Union of Geological Sciences later formally confirmed, by a near unanimous vote, the rejection of the working group's Anthropocene Epoch proposal for inclusion in the Geologic Time Scale.

== Geology ==
The Holocene is a geologic epoch that follows directly after the Pleistocene. Continental motions due to plate tectonics are less than a kilometre over a span of only 10,000 years. However, ice melt caused world sea levels to rise about 35 m (115 ft) in the early part of the Holocene and another 30 m in the later part of the Holocene. In addition, many areas above about 40 degrees north latitude had been depressed by the weight of the Pleistocene glaciers and rose as much as 180 m (590 ft) due to post-glacial rebound over the late Pleistocene and Holocene, and are still rising today.

The sea-level rise and temporary land depression allowed temporary marine incursions into areas that are now far from the sea. For example, marine fossils from the Holocene epoch have been found in locations such as Vermont and Michigan. Other than higher-latitude temporary marine incursions associated with glacial depression, Holocene fossils are found primarily in lakebed, floodplain, and cave deposits. Holocene marine deposits along low-latitude coastlines are rare because the rise in sea levels during the period exceeds any likely tectonic uplift of non-glacial origin.

Post-glacial rebound in the Scandinavia region resulted in a shrinking Baltic Sea. The region continues to rise, still causing weak earthquakes across Northern Europe. An equivalent event in North America was the rebound of Hudson Bay, as it shrank from its larger, immediate post-glacial Tyrrell Sea phase, to its present boundaries.

== Climate ==
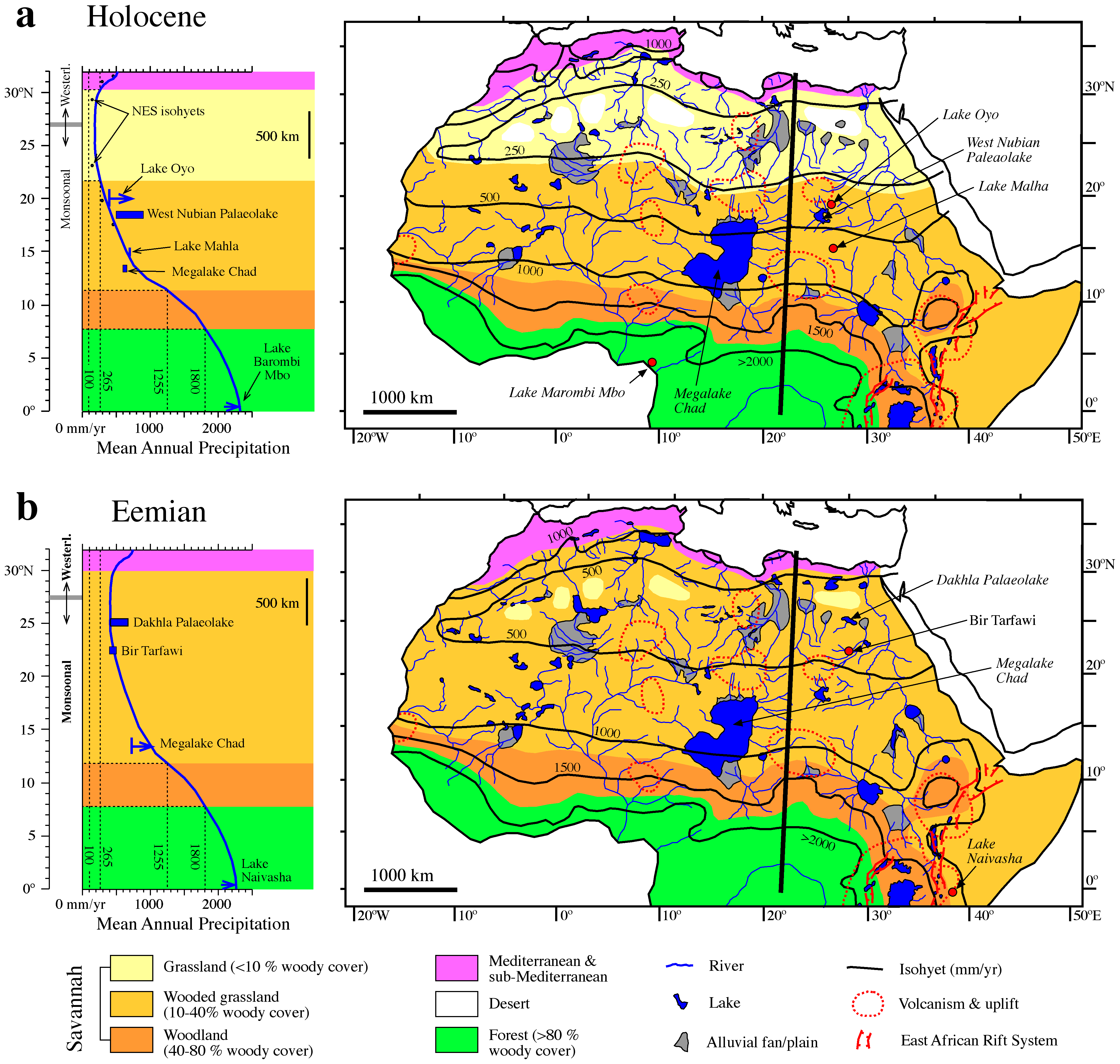
Vegetation and water bodies in northern and central Africa in the Eemian (bottom) and Holocene (top)

The climate throughout the Holocene has shown significant variability despite ice core records from Greenland suggesting a more stable climate following the preceding ice age. Marine chemical fluxes during the Holocene were lower than during the Younger Dryas, but were still considerable enough to imply notable changes in the climate.

The temporal and spatial extent of climate change during the Holocene is an area of considerable uncertainty, with radiative forcing recently proposed to be the origin of cycles identified in the North Atlantic region. Climate cyclicity through the Holocene (Bond events) has been observed in or near marine settings and is strongly controlled by glacial input to the North Atlantic. Periodicities of ≈2500, ≈1500, and ≈1000 years are generally observed in the North Atlantic. At the same time spectral analyses of the continental record, which is remote from oceanic influence, reveal persistent periodicities of 1,000 and 500 years that may correspond to solar activity variations during the Holocene Epoch. A 1,500-year cycle corresponding to the North Atlantic oceanic circulation may have had widespread global distribution in the Late Holocene. From 8,500 BP to 6,700 BP, North Atlantic climate oscillations were highly irregular and erratic because of perturbations from substantial ice discharge into the ocean from the collapsing Laurentide Ice Sheet. The Greenland ice core records indicate that climate changes became more regional and had a larger effect on the mid-to-low latitudes and mid-to-high latitudes after ~5600 B.P.

Human activity through land use changes already by the Mesolithic had major ecological impacts; it was an important influence on Holocene climatic changes, and is believed to be why the Holocene is an atypical interglacial that has not experienced significant cooling over its course. From the start of the Industrial Revolution onwards, large-scale anthropogenic greenhouse gas emissions caused the Earth to warm. Likewise, climatic changes have induced substantial changes in human civilisation over the course of the Holocene.

During the transition from the last glacial to the Holocene, the Huelmo–Mascardi Cold Reversal in the Southern Hemisphere began before the Younger Dryas, and the maximum warmth flowed south to north from 11,000 to 7,000 years ago. It appears that this was influenced by the residual glacial ice remaining in the Northern Hemisphere until the later date. The first major phase of Holocene climate was the Preboreal. At the start of the Preboreal occurred the Preboreal Oscillation (PBO). The Holocene Climatic Optimum (HCO) was a period of warming throughout the globe but was not globally synchronous and uniform. Following the HCO, the global climate entered a broad trend of very gradual cooling known as Neoglaciation, which lasted from the end of the HCO to before the Industrial Revolution. From the 10th-14th century, the climate was similar to that of modern times during a period known as the Mediaeval Warm Period (MWP), also known as the Mediaeval Climatic Optimum (MCO). It was found that the warming that is taking place in current years is both more frequent and more spatially homogeneous than what was experienced during the MWP. A warming of +1 degree Celsius occurs 5–40 times more frequently in modern years than during the MWP. The major forcing during the MWP was due to greater solar activity, which led to heterogeneity compared to the greenhouse gas forcing of modern years that leads to more homogeneous warming. This was followed by the Little Ice Age (LIA) from the 13th or 14th century to the mid-19th century. The LIA was the coldest interval of time of the past two millennia. Following the Industrial Revolution, warm decadal intervals became more common relative to before as a consequence of anthropogenic greenhouse gases, resulting in progressive global warming. In the late 20th century, anthropogenic forcing superseded variations in solar activity as the dominant driver of climate change, though solar activity has continued to play a role.

=== Europe ===
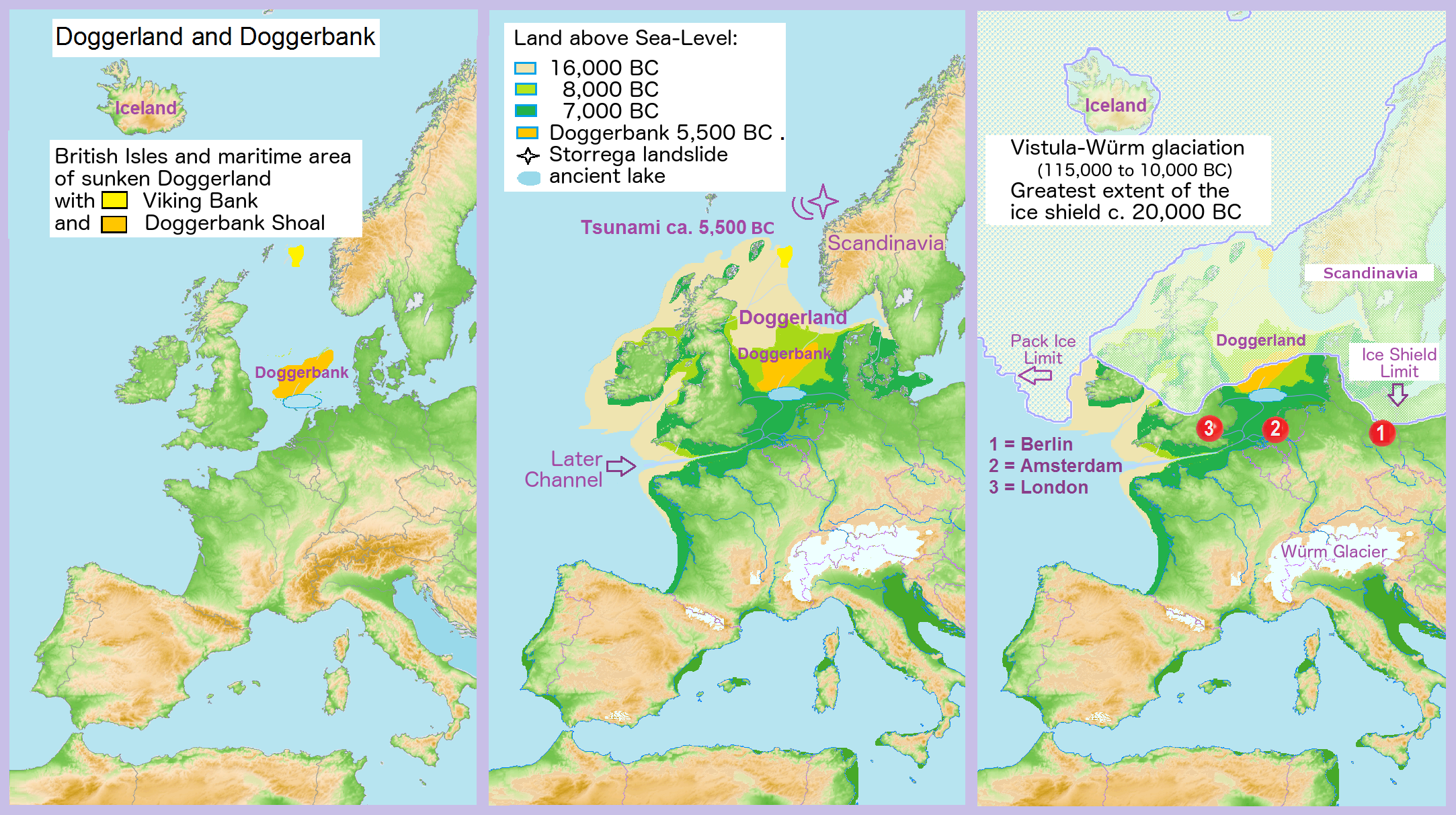
European coastline: modern (left), during the early Holocene (center) and during the Last Glacial Maximum (right)

Drangajökull, Iceland's northernmost glacier, melted shortly after 9,200 BP. In Northern Germany, the Middle Holocene saw a drastic increase in the amount of raised bogs, most likely related to sea level rise. Although human activity affected geomorphology and landscape evolution in Northern Germany throughout the Holocene, it only became a dominant influence in the last four centuries. In the French Alps, geochemistry and lithium isotope signatures in lake sediments have suggested gradual soil formation from the Last Glacial Period to the Holocene climatic optimum, and this soil development was altered by the settlement of human societies. Early anthropogenic activities such as deforestation and agriculture reinforced soil erosion, which peaked in the Middle Ages at an unprecedented level, marking human forcing as the most powerful factor affecting surface processes. The sedimentary record from Aitoliko Lagoon indicates that wet winters locally predominated from 210 to 160 BP, followed by dry winter dominance from 160 to 20 BP.

=== Africa ===
North Africa, dominated by the Sahara Desert in the present, was instead a savanna dotted with large lakes during the Early and Middle Holocene, regionally known as the African Humid Period (AHP). The northward migration of the Intertropical Convergence Zone (ITCZ) produced increased monsoon rainfall over North Africa. The lush vegetation of the Sahara brought an increase in pastoralism. The AHP ended around 5,500 BP, after which the Sahara began to dry and become the desert it is today.

A stronger East African Monsoon during the Middle Holocene increased precipitation in East Africa and raised lake levels. Around 800 AD, or 1,150 BP, a marine transgression occurred in southeastern Africa; in the Lake Lungué basin, this sea level highstand occurred from 740 to 910 AD, or from 1,210 to 1,040 BP, as evidenced by the lake's connection to the Indian Ocean at this time. This transgression was followed by a period of transition that lasted until 590 BP, when the region experienced significant aridification and began to be extensively used by humans for livestock herding.

In the Kalahari Desert, Holocene climate was overall very stable and environmental change was of low amplitude. Relatively cool conditions have prevailed since 4,000 BP.

=== Middle East ===
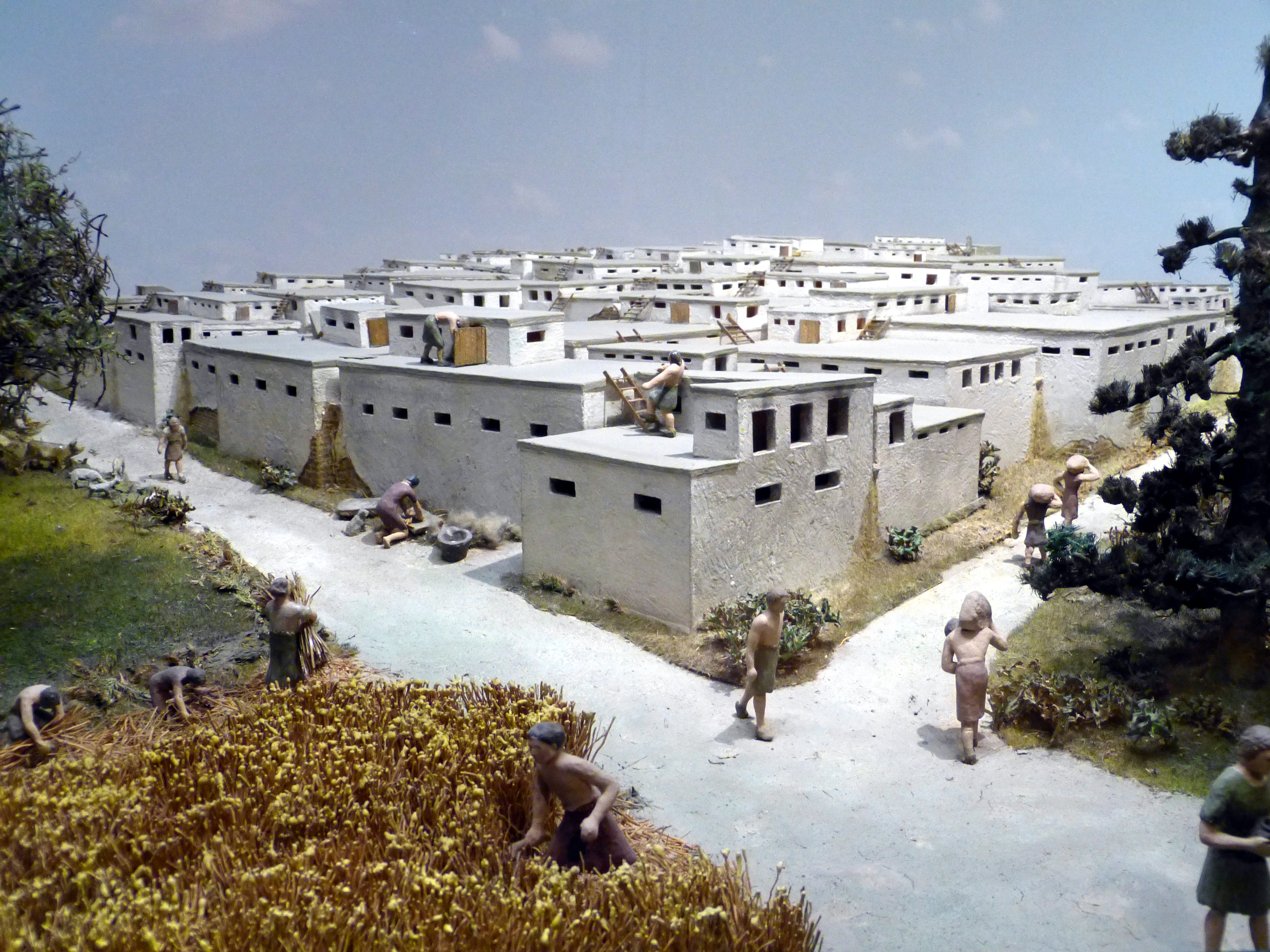
A model of Çatalhöyük, a commonly cited example of a proto-city, 7300 BC

In the Middle East, the Holocene brought a warmer and wetter climate, in contrast to the preceding cold, dry Younger Dryas. The Early Holocene saw the advent and spread of agriculture in the Fertile Crescent—sheep, goat, cattle, and later pig were domesticated, as well as cereals, like wheat and barley, and legumes—which would later disperse into much of the world. This 'Neolithic Revolution', likely influenced by Holocene climatic changes, included an increase in sedentism and population, eventually resulting in the world's first large-scale state societies in Mesopotamia and Egypt.

During the Middle Holocene, the Intertropical Convergence Zone, which governs the incursion of monsoon precipitation through the Arabian Peninsula, shifted southwards, resulting in increased aridity. In the Middle to Late Holocene, the coastline of the Levant and Persian Gulf receded, prompting a shift in human settlement patterns following this marine regression.

=== Siberia ===
Fire activity decreased sharply in Western Siberia during the Early Holocene after a relative high during the Late Glacial Period. The Middle Holocene saw an increase in fire activity concomitant with the spread of pine forests, but fire activity once again decreased during the Late Holocene.

=== Central Asia ===
Central Asia experienced glacial-like temperatures until about 8,000 BP, when the Laurentide Ice Sheet collapsed. In Xinjiang, long-term Holocene warming increased meltwater supply during summers, creating large lakes and oases at low altitudes and inducing enhanced moisture recycling. In the Tien Shan, sedimentological evidence from Swan Lake suggests the period between 8,500 and 6,900 BP was relatively warm, with steppe meadow vegetation being predominant. An increase in Cyperaceae from 6,900 to 2,600 BP indicates cooling and humidification of the Tian Shan climate that was interrupted by a warm period between 5,500 and 4,500 BP. After 2,600 BP, an alpine steppe climate prevailed across the region. Sand dune evolution in the Bayanbulak Basin shows that the region was very dry from the Holocene's beginning until around 6,500 BP, when a wet interval began. In the Tibetan Plateau, the moisture optimum spanned from around 7,500 to 5,500 BP. The Tarim Basin records the onset of significant aridification around 3,000-2,000 BP.

=== South Asia ===
After 11,800 BP, and especially between 10,800 and 9,200 BP, Ladakh experienced tremendous moisture increase most likely related to the strengthening of the Indian Summer Monsoon (ISM). From 9,200 to 6,900 BP, relative aridity persisted in Ladakh. A second major humid phase occurred in Ladakh from 6,900 to 4,800 BP, after which the region was again arid.

From 900 to 1,200 AD, during the MWP, the ISM was again strong as evidenced by low δ^{18}O values from the Ganga Plain.

The sediments of Lonar Lake in Maharashtra record dry conditions around 11,400 BP that transitioned into a much wetter climate from 11,400 to 11,100 BP due to intensification of the ISM. Over the Early Holocene, the region was very wet, but during the Middle Holocene from 6,200 to 3,900 BP, aridification occurred, with the subsequent Late Holocene being relatively arid as a whole.

Coastal southwestern India experienced a stronger ISM from 9,690 to 7,560 BP, during the HCO. From 3,510 to 2,550 BP, during the Late Holocene, the ISM became weaker, although this weakening was interrupted by an interval of unusually high ISM strength from 3,400 to 3,200 BP.

=== East Asia ===
Southwestern China experienced long-term warming during the Early Holocene up until ~7,000 BP. Northern China experienced an abrupt aridification event approximately 4,000 BP. From around 3,500 to 3,000 BP, northeastern China underwent a prolonged cooling, manifesting itself with the disruption of Bronze Age civilisations in the region. Eastern and southern China, the monsoonal regions of China, were wetter than present in the Early and Middle Holocene. Lake Huguangyan's TOC, δ^{13}C_{wax}, δ^{13}C_{org}, δ^{15}N values suggest the period of peak moisture lasted from 9,200 to 1,800 BP and was attributable to a strong East Asian Summer Monsoon (EASM). Late Holocene cooling events in the region were dominantly influenced by solar forcing, with many individual cold snaps linked to solar minima such as the Oort, Wolf, Spörer, and Maunder Minima. A notable cooling event in southeastern China occurred 3,200 BP. Strengthening of the winter monsoon occurred around 5,500, 4,000, and 2,500 BP. Monsoonal regions of China became more arid in the Late Holocene.

In the Sea of Japan, the Middle Holocene was notable for its warmth, with rhythmic temperature fluctuations every 400–500 and 1,000 years.

=== Southeast Asia ===
Before 7,500 BP, the Gulf of Thailand was exposed above sea level and was very arid. A marine transgression occurred from 7,500 to 6,200 BP amidst global warming.

=== North America ===
During the Middle Holocene, western North America was drier than present, with wetter winters and drier summers. After the end of the thermal maximum of the HCO around 4,500 BP, the East Greenland Current underwent strengthening. A massive megadrought occurred from 2,800 to 1,850 BP in the Great Basin.

Eastern North America underwent abrupt warming and humidification around 10,500 BP and then declined from 9,300 to 9,100 BP. The region has undergone a long term wettening since 5,500 BP occasionally interrupted by intervals of high aridity. A major cool event lasting from 5,500 to 4,700 BP was coeval with a major humidification before being terminated by a major drought and warming at the end of that interval.

=== South America ===
During the Early Holocene, relative sea level rose in the Bahia region, causing a landward expansion of mangroves. During the Late Holocene, the mangroves declined as sea level dropped and freshwater supply increased. In the Santa Catarina region, the maximum sea level highstand was around 2.1 metres above present and occurred about 5,800 to 5,000 BP. Sea levels at Rocas Atoll were likewise higher than present for much of the Late Holocene.

=== Australia ===
The Northwest Australian Summer Monsoon was in a strong phase from 8,500 to 6,400 BP, from 5,000 to 4,000 BP (possibly until 3,000 BP), and from 1,300 to 900 BP, with weak phases in between and the current weak phase beginning around 900 BP after the end of the last strong phase.

=== New Zealand ===
Ice core measurements imply that the sea surface temperature (SST) gradient east of New Zealand, across the subtropical front (STF), was around 2 degrees Celsius during the HCO. This temperature gradient is significantly less than modern times, which is around 6 degrees Celsius. A study utilizing five SST proxies from 37°S to 60°S latitude confirmed that the strong temperature gradient was confined to the area immediately south of the STF, and is correlated with reduced westerly winds near New Zealand. Since 7,100 BP, New Zealand experienced 53 cyclones similar in magnitude to Cyclone Bola.

=== Pacific ===
Evidence from the Galápagos Islands shows that the El Niño–Southern Oscillation (ENSO) was significantly weaker during the Middle Holocene, but that the strength of ENSO became moderate to high over the Late Holocene.

== Ecological developments ==
The huge reduction in terrestrial megafauna species outside of Africa during the preceding 40,000 years (the Late Pleistocene megafauna extinctions), likely as a result of climate change, human hunting, or a combination of both, including in the extinction of over half of all megafauna species, left Holocene ecosystems highly altered and depauperate (poor in diversity) at their highest trophic levels compared to those in the preceding Pleistocene. Megafauna losses continued during the early-mid Holocene, with the Irish elk (Megaloceros giganteus, also known as the giant deer) surviving until around 7,700 years ago in western Russia, with woolly mammoths (Mammuthus primigenius) surviving in mainland Siberia until around 10,000 years ago, with a small population on Wrangel Island surviving until around 4,000 years ago.

Throughout the world, ecosystems in cooler climates that were previously regional have been isolated in higher altitude ecological "islands". Surviving animal species like the red deer (Cervus elaphus) showed different behaviours: In the Adriatic region, they have been shown to migrate less than in the Pleistocene.

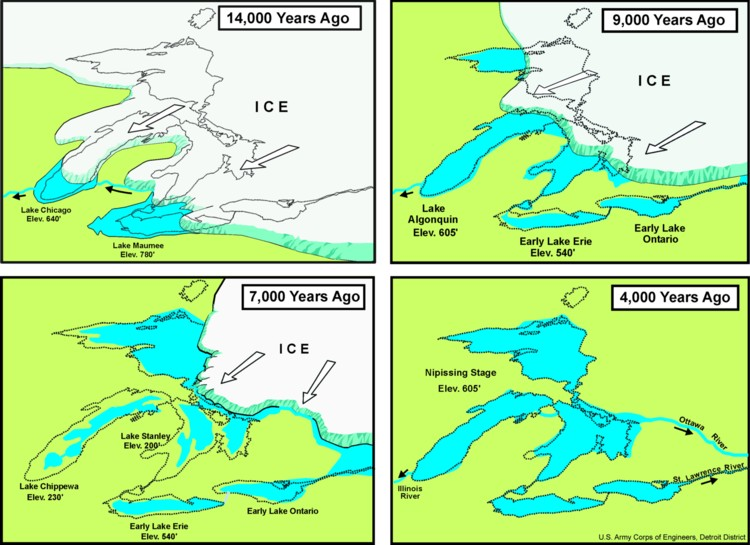
Stages of proglacial lake development in the region of the current North American Great Lakes

The 8.2-ka event, an abrupt cold spell recorded as a negative excursion in the δ^{18}O record lasting 400 years, is the most prominent climatic event occurring in the Holocene Epoch, and may have marked a resurgence of ice cover. It has been suggested that this event was caused by the final drainage of Lake Agassiz, which had been confined by the glaciers, disrupting the thermohaline circulation of the Atlantic. This disruption was the result of an ice dam over Hudson Bay collapsing sending cold Lake Agassiz water into the North Atlantic Ocean. Furthermore, studies show that the melting of Lake Agassiz led to a sea-level rise which flooded the North American coastal landscape. The basal peat plant was then used to determine the resulting local sea-level rise of 0.20-0.56 m in the Mississippi Delta. Subsequent research, however, suggested that the discharge was probably superimposed upon a longer episode of cooler climate lasting up to 600 years, and observed that the extent of the area affected was unclear.

== Human developments ==
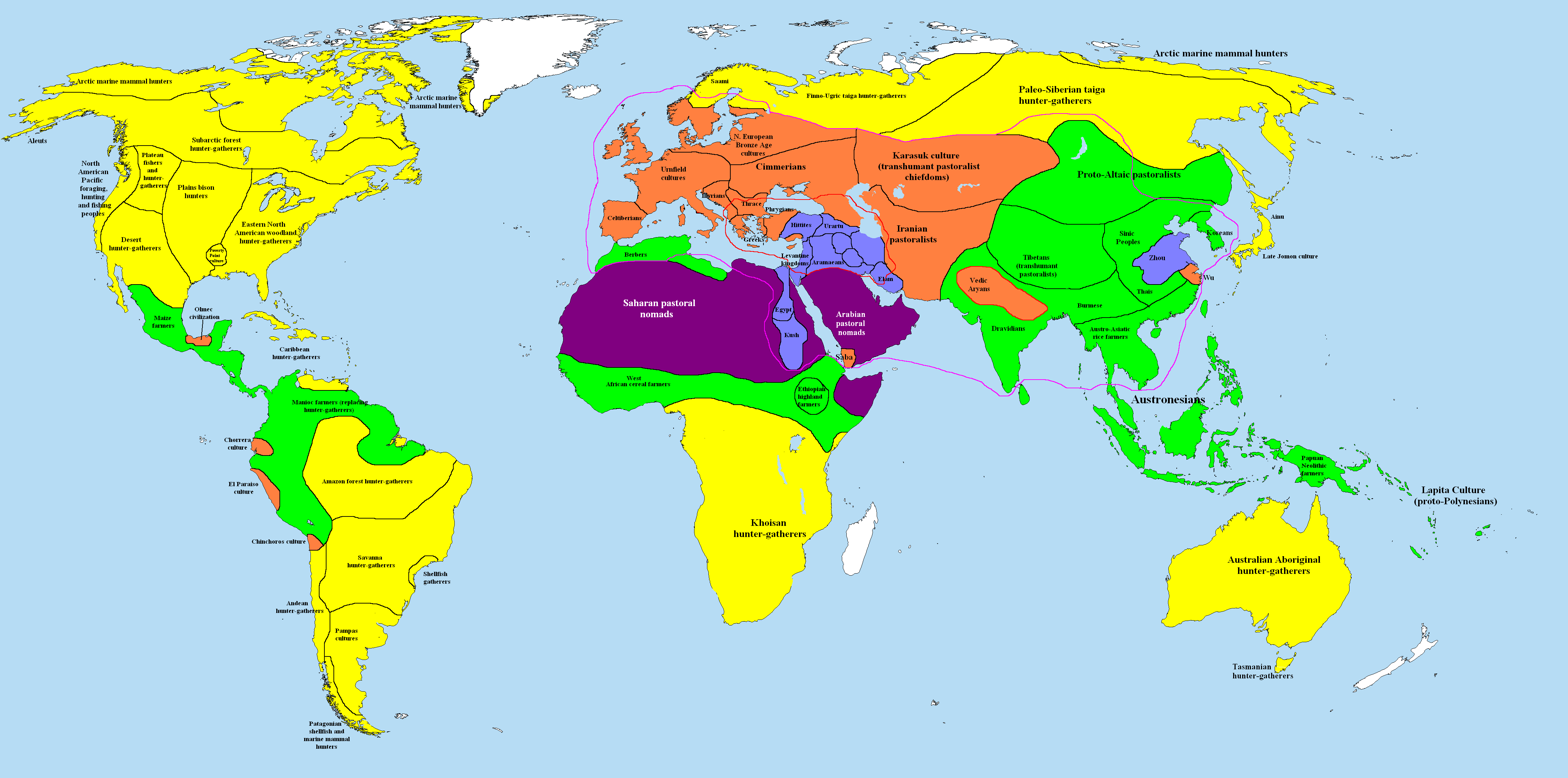
Overview map of the world at the end of the 2nd millennium BC, color-coded by cultural stage: hunter-gatherers (Palaeolithic or Mesolithic) nomadic pastoralists simple farming societies complex farming societies (Bronze Age Old World, Olmecs, Andes) state societies (Fertile Crescent, Egypt, China)

The beginning of the Holocene corresponds with the beginning of the Mesolithic age in most of Europe. In regions such as the Middle East and Anatolia, the term Epipaleolithic is preferred in place of Mesolithic, as they refer to approximately the same time period. Cultures in this period include Hamburgian, Federmesser, and the Natufian culture, during which the oldest inhabited places still existing on Earth were first settled, such as Tell es-Sultan (Jericho) in the Middle East. There is also evolving archeological evidence of proto-religion at locations such as Göbekli Tepe, as long ago as the 9th millennium BC.

The preceding period of the Late Pleistocene had already brought advancements such as the bow and arrow, creating more efficient forms of hunting and replacing spear throwers. In the Holocene, however, the domestication of plants and animals allowed humans to develop villages and towns in centralized locations. Archaeological data shows that between 10,000 and 7,000 BP rapid domestication of plants and animals took place in tropical and subtropical parts of Asia, Africa, and Central America. The development of farming allowed humans to transition away from hunter-gatherer nomadic cultures, which did not establish permanent settlements, to a more sustainable sedentary lifestyle. This form of lifestyle change allowed humans to develop towns and villages in centralized locations, which gave rise to the world known today. It is believed that the domestication of plants and animals began in the early part of the Holocene in the tropical areas of the planet. Because these areas had warm, moist temperatures, the climate was perfect for effective farming. Culture development and human population change, specifically in South America, has also been linked to spikes in hydroclimate resulting in climate variability in the mid-Holocene (8.2–4.2 k cal BP). Climate change on seasonality and available moisture also allowed for favorable agricultural conditions which promoted human development for Maya and Tiwanaku regions. In the Korean Peninsula, climatic changes fostered a population boom during the Middle Chulmun period from 5,500 to 5,000 BP, but contributed to a subsequent bust during the Late and Final Chulmun periods, from 5,000 to 4,000 BP and from 4,000 to 3,500 BP respectively.

== Extinction event ==
The Holocene extinction, otherwise referred to as the sixth mass extinction or Anthropocene extinction, is an ongoing extinction event of species during the present Holocene epoch (with the more recent time sometimes called Anthropocene) as a result of human activity. The included extinctions span numerous families of fungi, plants, and animals, including mammals, birds, reptiles, amphibians, fish and invertebrates. With widespread degradation of highly biodiverse habitats such as coral reefs and rainforests, as well as other areas, the vast majority of these extinctions are thought to be undocumented, as the species are undiscovered at the time of their extinction, or no one has yet discovered their extinction. The current rate of extinction of species is estimated at 100 to 1,000 times higher than natural background extinction rates.

== Gallery ==
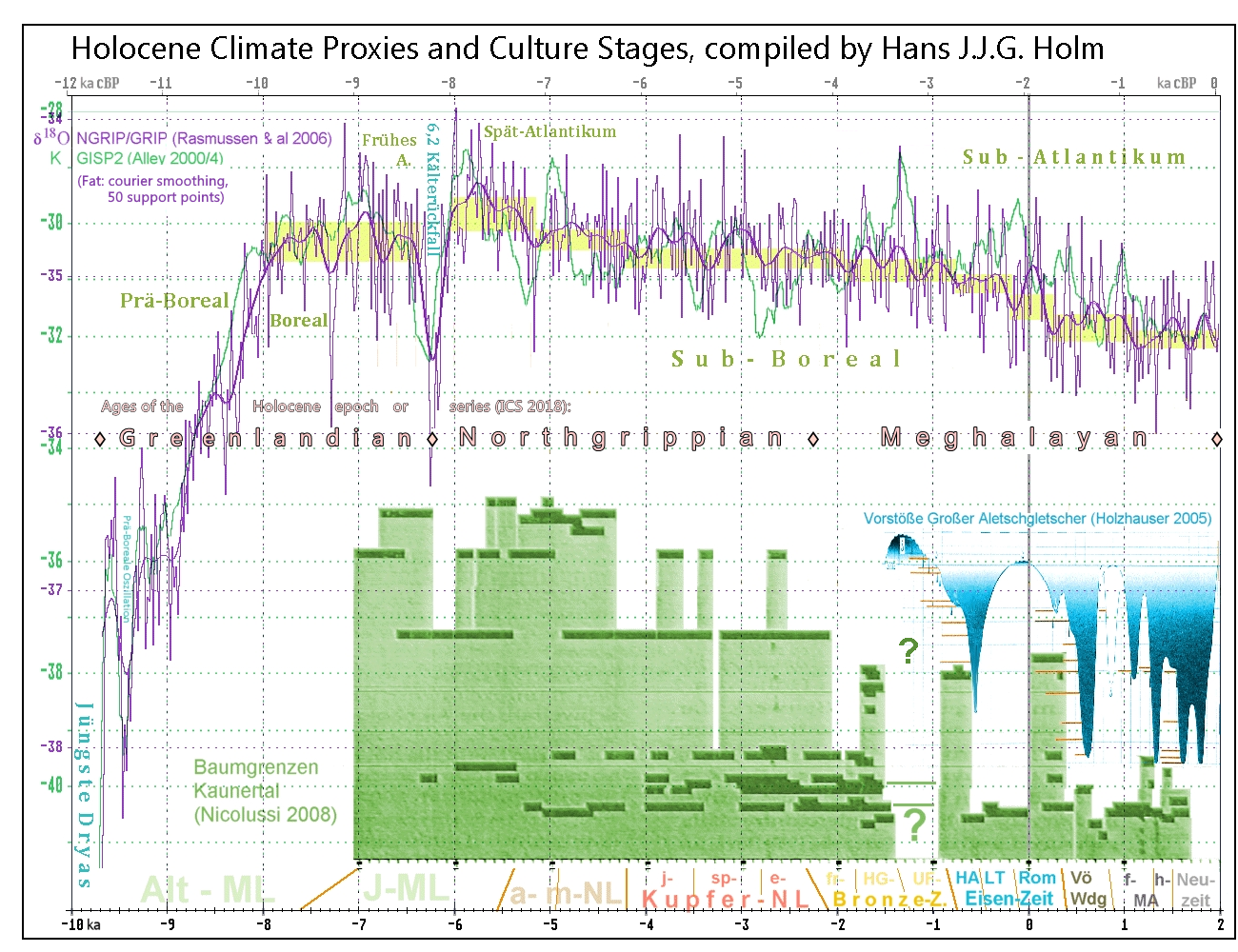
Combination of temperature indicators ("proxies") for north-western Europe from Greenland icecores and Alpine glacier extensions, with subdivisions from three disciplines

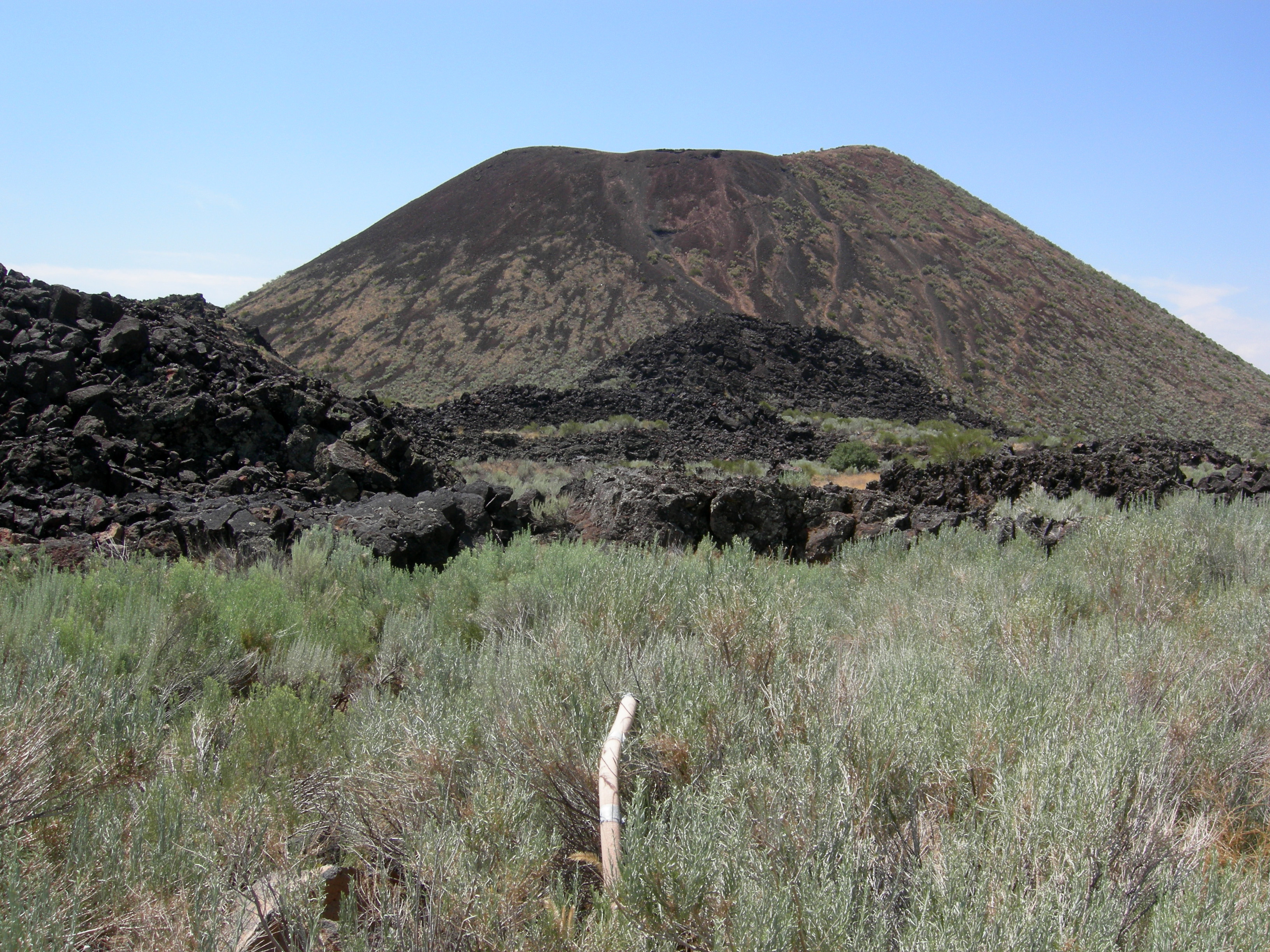
Holocene cinder cone volcano on Utah State Route 18 near Veyo

Paleogeographic reconstruction of the North Sea approximately 9,000 years ago during the early Holocene and after the end of the Last Glacial Period

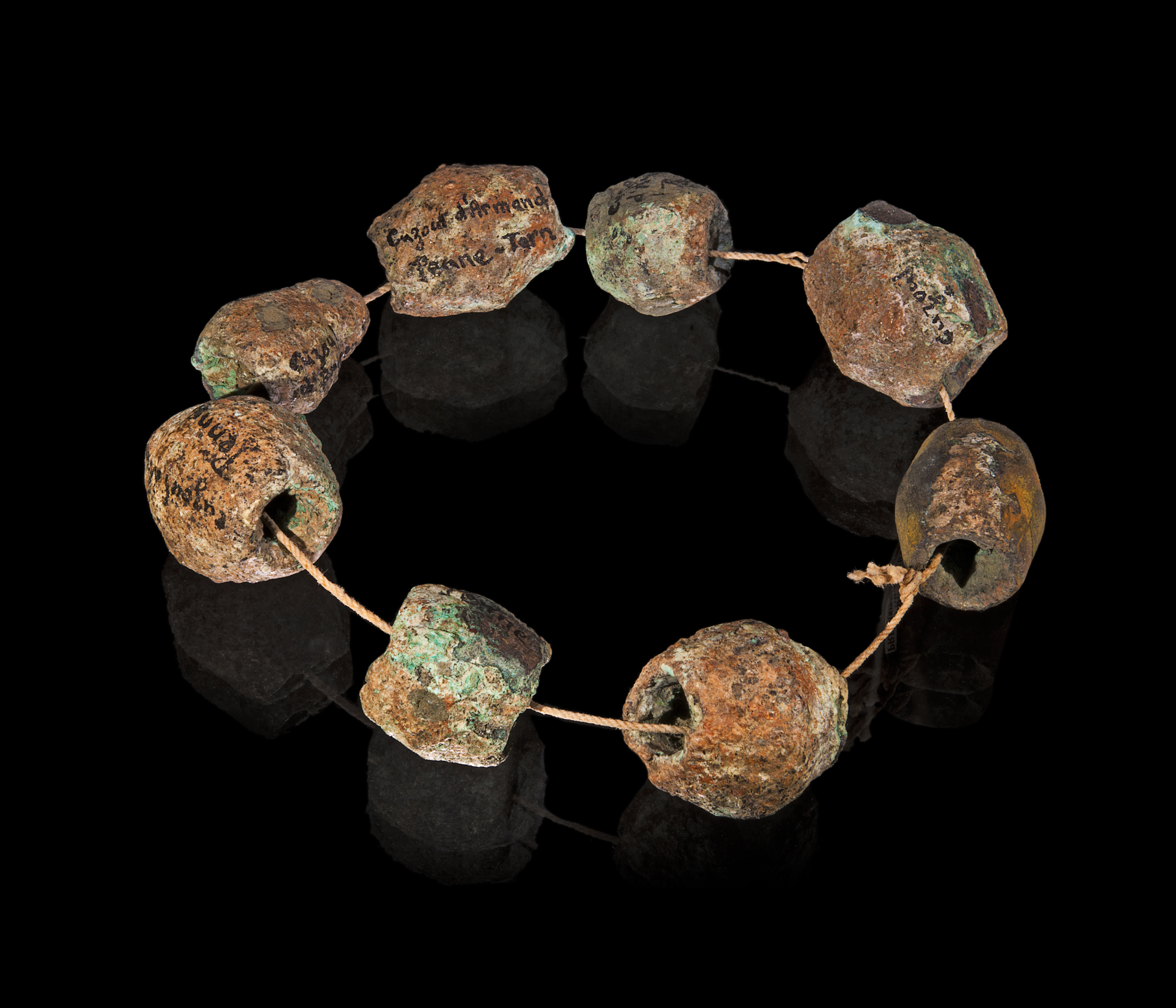
Bronze bead necklace, Muséum de Toulouse

== See also ==
- 4.2-kiloyear event
- 8.2-kiloyear event
- 10th millennium BC
- Blytt–Sernander system
- Holocene calendar
- African humid period
- Older Peron
- Outburst flood
- Piora Oscillation
- Late Pleistocene extinctions
- Ostrich eggshell beads
