= 4.2-kiloyear event =

Severe climatic event starting around 2200 BC

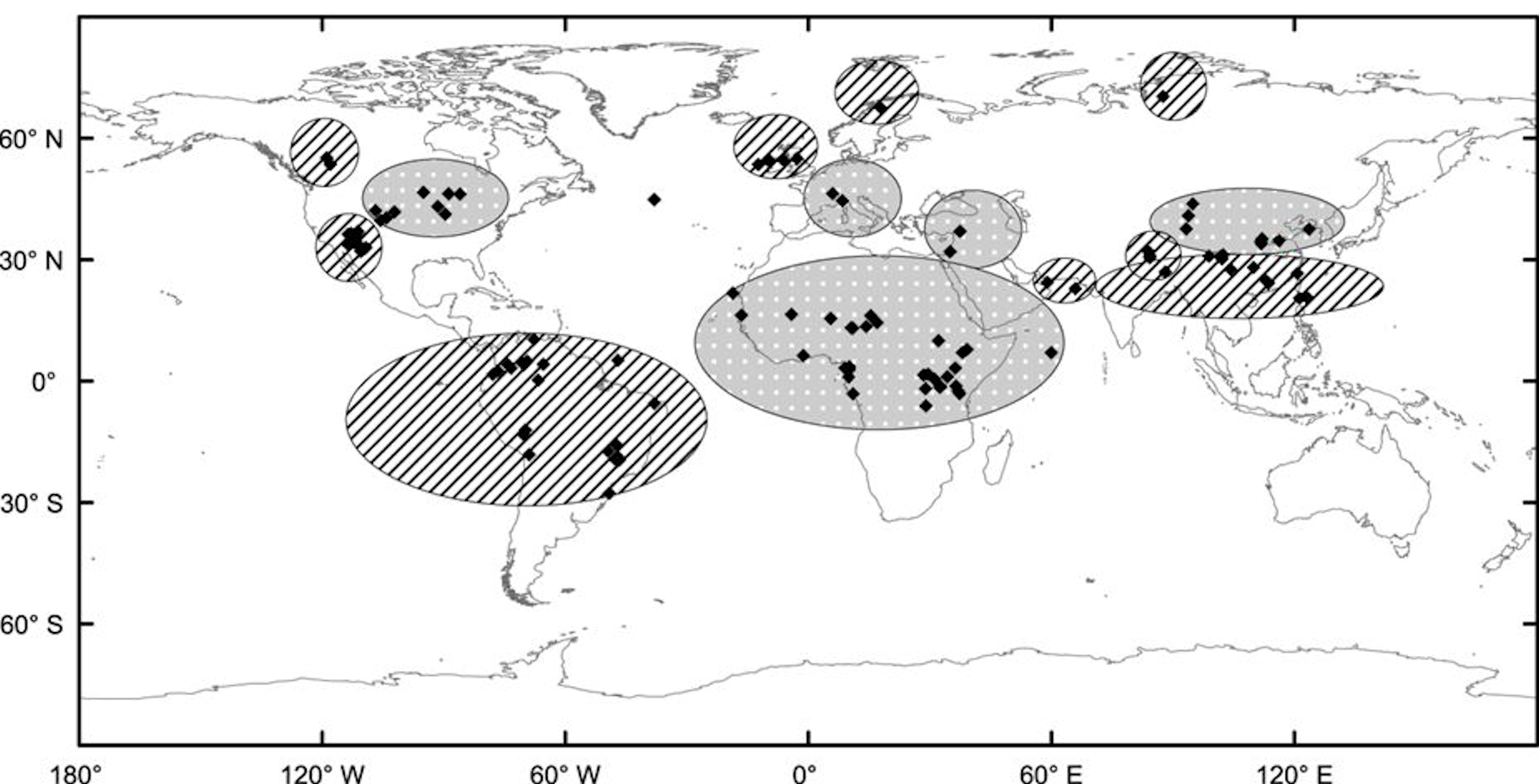
Global distribution of the 4.2 kiloyear event. The hatched areas were affected by wet conditions or flooding, and the dotted areas by drought or dust storms.

The 4.2-kiloyear event (also known as the 4.2 ka event) was an aridification event (long-term drought), 4,200 years ago. It was one of the most severe climatic events of the Holocene epoch. It defines the beginning of the current Meghalayan age in the Holocene epoch.

Starting around 2200 BC, it most likely lasted the entire 22nd century BC. It has been hypothesised to have caused the collapse of the Old Kingdom in Egypt, the Akkadian Empire in Mesopotamia, and the Liangzhu culture in the lower Yangtze River area. The drought may also have initiated the collapse of the Indus Valley Civilisation, with some of its population moving southeast to follow the movement of their desired habitat, as well as the migration of Indo-European-speaking people into India. Some scientists disagree with that conclusion, citing evidence that the event was not a global drought and did not happen in a clear timeline.

== Causes ==
Modelling evidence suggests that the 4.2 ka event was the result of a significant weakening of the Atlantic meridional overturning circulation (AMOC), disrupting global ocean currents and generating precipitation and temperature changes in various regions. The Intertropical Convergence Zone (ITCZ) abruptly shifted southward. Evidence suggests increased El Niño–Southern Oscillation (ENSO) variability also played a role in generating the climatic conditions associated with the event. Explosive volcanism in Iceland has also been proposed as a cause, though the low sulphur content of Icelandic volcanoes has led other studies to suggest it had a negligible impact on global climate.

== Evidence ==
A phase of intense aridity around 2200 BC is recorded in physical evidence across North Africa, the Middle East, the Red Sea, the Arabian Peninsula, the Indian subcontinent, and midcontinental North America. Glaciers throughout the mountain ranges of western Canada advanced around that time. Iceland also experienced glacial advance. Evidence has also been found in an Italian cave flowstone, the Kilimanjaro ice sheet, and in Andean glacier ice. The onset of the aridification in Mesopotamia around 2100 BC also coincided with a cooling event in the North Atlantic, known as Bond event 3.

In 2018, the International Commission on Stratigraphy divided the Holocene epoch into three periods, with the late Holocene from around 2250 BC onwards designated as the Meghalayan stage/age. The boundary stratotype is a speleothem in Mawmluh cave in India, and the global auxiliary stratotype is an ice core from Mount Logan in Canada. However, justification for this division is debated as the event was not a global drought and did not happen within a clear timeframe. Jessica Tierney, a paleoclimatologist at the University of Arizona in Tucson, states that proponents of the new partitioning mistakenly "lumped together evidence of other droughts and wet periods, sometimes centuries away from the event."

== Effects ==
=== Europe ===
==== British Isles ====
In Ireland, there is little definitive record of the 4.2 ka event outside of a brief isotopic excursion in some cave speleothem records. The manner in which this climatic event manifested itself in the region is thus unclear. In Great Britain as in Ireland, the nature of the 4.2 ka event is ambiguous and unclear. The yew tree's abundance declined in eastern England.

==== Central Europe ====
Analysis of sediments from Lake Spore reveals that in Poland, winters became colder between 4250 and 4000 BP, with this cooling likely responsible for a podzolisation (generation of boreal forest soil type) event around 4200 BP, whereas summer temperatures remained constant. Humidity levels were not affected by the 4.2 ka event. Northeastern Poland became drier, as indicated by declining lake levels.

==== Iberian Peninsula ====
On the Iberian Peninsula, in general the climate between 2800 and 1100 BC is quite stable and relatively humid. A reconstruction of precipitation shows two rapid, pronounced dry phases from 2350 to 2200 BC (4.3 - 4.15 ka BP) and from 2100 to 2000 BC (4.05 - 3.95 ka BP). The dry phases were followed by a shift towards wetter conditions, suggesting a more complex pattern of climate change than other regions during the 4.2 ka event.

On the entire Iberian Peninsula, there is a slight decrease in settlement activity from 2500 BC, followed by a significant decline between 2300 and 2100 cal BC. In the southwest, and especially in the Évora region, a collapse of settlement activity has been documented, and in the following centuries settlement remained at a low level. In south-eastern Spain, on the other hand, a few archaeological cultures now started to flourish. One is associated the construction of motillas-type settlements and the other to El Argar.

The construction of motillas-type settlements in the period after 2200 BC is believed to be the consequence of the severe aridification that affected this area. According to M. M. Mejías Moreno, who conducted the first palaeohydrogeological interdisciplinary study in La Mancha, Spain, suggests these motillas may be the Iberian Peninsula's oldest groundwater collection system, with construction possibly linked to the severe, prolonged drought and other climatic disruptions of the 4.2 ka event. The authors' analysis verified a relationship between the geological substrate and the spatial distribution of the motillas.

The other is the El Argar phenomenon, which began to flourish at around the same time, although there was initially a slight collapse, too. However, it soon stabilised and was not negatively affected by the second dry period. It is conceivable, although not perfectly clear as M. Hinz and his colleagues stress, that the two developments of decreasing settlements in the west of the Iberian Peninsula and increasing settlement activities in the east are linked.

==== Italian Peninsula ====
In the Gulf of Genoa, mean annual temperature dropped, winters became drier, and summers became wetter and cooler, a phenomenon most likely caused by the southward retreat of the ITCZ in summer that weakened the high pressure and reduced ocean warming over the western Mediterranean, which led to retarded evaporation rates in the autumn and early winter. The 4.2 ka event appears to have wettened the climate in the Alps. Lake Petit saw increased precipitation during the ice-free season, evidenced by an increase in δ^{18}O_{diatom}. Southern Italy, in contrast, experienced intense aridification. A major decline in forests occurred in Italy as a result of the climatic perturbation.

=== North Africa ===
At the site of Sidi Ali in the Middle Atlas, δ^{18}O values indicate not a dry spell but a centennial-scale period of cooler and more humid climate. In c. 2150 BC, Egypt was hit by a series of exceptionally low Nile floods that may have influenced the collapse of the centralised government of the Old Kingdom after a famine.

=== Middle East ===
The south-central Levant experienced two phases of dry climate punctuated by a wet interval in between and thus the 4.2 ka event in the region has been termed a W-shaped event.

Enhanced dust flux coeval with δ^{18}O peaks is recorded in Mesopotamia from 4260 to 3970 BP, reflecting intense aridity. The aridification of Mesopotamia may have been related to the onset of cooler sea-surface temperatures in the North Atlantic (Bond event 3), as analysis of the modern instrumental record shows that large (50%) interannual reductions in Mesopotamian water supply result when subpolar northwest Atlantic sea surface temperatures are anomalously cool. The headwaters of the Tigris and Euphrates rivers are fed by elevation-induced capture of winter Mediterranean rainfall.

The Akkadian Empire in 2300 BC was the second civilization to subsume independent societies into a single state (the first being ancient Egypt around 3100 BC). It has been claimed that the collapse of the state was influenced by a wide-ranging, centuries-long drought. Archaeological evidence documents widespread abandonment of the agricultural plains of northern Mesopotamia and dramatic influxes of refugees into southern Mesopotamia, around 2170 BC, which may have weakened the Akkadian state. A 180-km-long wall, the "Repeller of the Amorites", was built across central Mesopotamia to stem nomadic incursions to the south. Around 2150 BC, the Gutian people, who originally inhabited the Zagros Mountains, defeated the demoralised Akkadian army, took Akkad and destroyed it around 2115 BC. Widespread agricultural change in the Near East is visible at the end of the 3rd millennium BC. Weiss suggests a figure of 300,000 displaced from the zone of uncertainty, while Burke suggests no less than 126,400 (99,000 displaced from Upper Mesopotamia; 17,400 from Middle Euphrates and approximately 10,000 from territories from northeast to southeast of Ebla). Resettlement of the northern plains by smaller sedentary populations occurred near 1900 BC, three centuries after the collapse.

In the Persian Gulf region, there was a sudden change in settlement pattern, style of pottery and tombs. The 22nd century BC drought marks the end of the Umm Al Nar culture and the change to the Wadi Suq culture. Fossil coral studies from Oman indicate that extended winter shamal seasons circa 2200 BC caused salinization of irrigated fields, sharply reducing crop yields and sparking widespread famine that ultimately brought down the ancient Akkadian Empire.

=== South and Central Asia ===
The Siberian High increased in area and magnitude, which blocked moisture-carrying westerly winds, causing intense aridity in Central Asia.

The Indian Summer Monsoon (ISM) and Indian Winter Monsoon (IWM) both declined in strength, leading to highly arid conditions in northwestern South Asia. The ISM's decline is evident from low Mn/Ti and Mn/Fe values in Rara Lake from this time. The area around PankangTeng Tso Lake in the Tawang district of Arunachal Pradesh had cold and dry conditions and was dominated by subalpine vegetation. Though some proxy records suggest a prolonged, multicentennial dry period, others indicate that the 4.2 ka event was a series of multidecadal droughts instead.

==== Effects on the Indus Valley civilization ====
In the 2nd millennium BC, widespread aridification occurred in the Eurasian steppes and in South Asia. On the steppes, the vegetation changed, driving "higher mobility and transition to the nomadic cattle breeding." (Note: Demkina et al. (2017): "In the second millennium BC, humidization of the climate led to the divergence of the soil cover with secondary formation of the complexes of chestnut soils and solonetzes. This paleoecological crisis had a significant effect on the economy of the tribes in the Late Catacomb and Post-Catacomb time stipulating their higher mobility and transition to the nomadic cattle breeding.") Water shortage also strongly affected South Asia:

This time was one of great upheaval for ecological reasons. Prolonged failure of rains caused acute water shortage in large areas, causing the collapse of sedentary urban cultures in south central Asia, Afghanistan, Iran, and India, and triggering large-scale migrations. Inevitably, the new arrivals came to merge with and dominate the post-urban cultures.

Urban centers of the Indus Valley Civilisation were abandoned and replaced by disparate local cultures because of the same climate change that affected the neighbouring regions to the west. As of 2016, many scholars believed that drought and a decline in trade with Egypt and Mesopotamia caused the collapse of the Indus civilization. The Ghaggar-Hakra system was rain-fed, and water supply depended on the monsoons. The Indus Valley climate grew significantly cooler and drier from around 1800 BC, which is linked to a contemporary general weakening of the monsoon. Aridity increased, with the Ghaggar-Hakra River retracting its reach towards the foothills of the Himalayas, leading to erratic and less-extensive floods, which made inundation agriculture less sustainable. Aridification reduced the water supply enough to cause the civilization's demise, and to scatter its population eastward.

=== East Asia ===
The 4.2 ka event resulted in an enormous reduction in the strength of the East Asian Summer Monsoon (EASM). This profound weakening of the EASM has been postulated to have resulted from a reduction in the strength of the AMOC; the cooling of North Atlantic waters led to retardation of northward movements of the EASM and diminished rainfall on its northern margin. A stark humidity gradient emerged between northern and southern China because of the EASM's southward move. Northeastern China was strongly affected; proxy records from Hulun Lake in Inner Mongolia reveal a major dry event from 4210–3840 BP, while records from Wudalianchi Crater Lake indicate a sharp decline in evergreen broadleaf forests. δ^{18}O values from Yonglu Cave in Hubei confirm that the region became characterised by increased aridity and show that the onset of the event was gradual but that its end was sudden. In the Luoyang Basin, the 4.2 ka event was much less strongly felt; precipitation was low, but not extremely so. In central China, precipitation increased, meanwhile.

In the Korean Peninsula, the 4.2 ka event was associated with significant aridification, measured by the large decline in arboreal pollen percentage (AP). On Jeju Island, in contrast, the climate was humid, as evidenced by the presence of tychoplanktonic species found in the Sara-oreum and Muljangori-oreum wetlands.

The Sannai-Maruyama site in Japan declined during the same period; the growing population of the Jomon culture gradually turned to decline after that.

Rebun Island experienced an abrupt, intense cooling around 4,130 BP believed to be associated with the 4.2 ka event.

==== Effects on Chinese civilization ====
The drought may have caused the collapse of Neolithic cultures around Central China in the late 3rd millennium BC, or at least partially contributed to it. In the Yishu River Basin (a river basin that consists of the Yi River (沂河) of Shandong and Shu River), the flourishing Longshan culture was affected by a cooling that severely reduced rice output and led to a substantial decrease in population and to fewer archaeological sites. Around 2000 BC, Longshan was displaced by the Yueshi culture, which had fewer and less-sophisticated artifacts of ceramic and bronze. The Liangzhu civilization in the lower reaches of the Yangtze River also declined during the same period. The 4.2 ka event is also believed to have helped collapse the Dawenkou culture. The Longshan culture of the less strongly affected Luoyang Basin, however, continued to develop and thrive. The 4.2 ka event had no discernible impact on the spread of millet cultivation in the region.

=== Southeast Asia ===
The 4.2 ka event substantially reduced El Niño–Southern Oscillation (ENSO) variability in Borneo, as evidenced by stalagmite δ^{18}O values. The reduction in ENSO variability that occurred was comparable only to the earlier 8.2 ka event.

=== Southern Africa ===
Stalagmites from northeastern Namibia demonstrate the region became wetter thanks to the southward shift of the Intertropical Convergence Zone (ITCZ). The Namibian humidification event had two pulses.

=== Mascarenes ===
No signal of the 4.2 ka event has been found in Rodrigues.

== See also ==
- 2300–2200 BCE Great Flood (China)
- 2354–2345 BCE climate anomaly
- 8.2-kiloyear event
- African humid period
- Bond event
- Climate variability and change
- Late Bronze Age collapse § Environmental (c. 1200–1150 BC)
- Timeline of environmental history
