= Older Peron =

Global sea-level high-stand during the Holocene Epoch

The Older Peron was the name for a period identified in 1961 as an episode of a global sea-level (i.e. eustatic) high-stand during the Holocene Epoch. Modern understanding of the various factors involved in quantifying eustatic sea level, particularly processes relating to ocean siphoning and glacio-hydro-isostatic adjustment, claim that such previous instances of purported high-stands were not globally coherent, and do not constitute episodes of eustatic sea level higher than present.
