= 8.2-kiloyear event =

Rapid global cooling about 8,200 years ago

The 8.2-kiloyear event was a rapid drop in global temperatures that occurred around 8,200 years ago (BP), lasting between two and four centuries. This event marks the beginning of the Northgrippian stage within the Holocene epoch. While this cooling phase was not as intense as the earlier Younger Dryas period that occurred just before the Holocene began, it was still significant. During the 8.2-kiloyear event, atmospheric methane levels dropped by 80 parts per billion, a 15% reduction, suggesting a broad cooling and drying trend across the Northern Hemisphere.

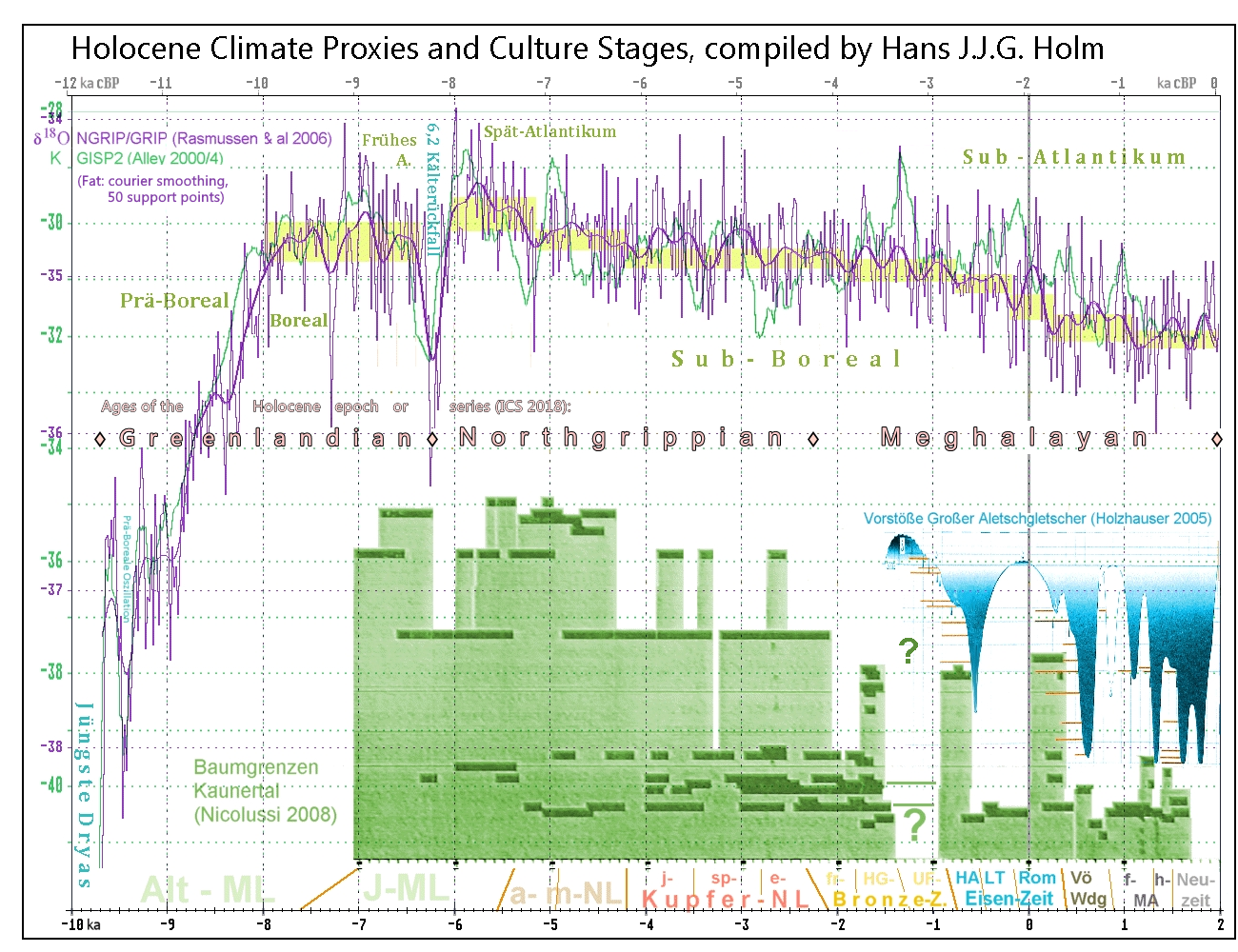
The 8.2 ky event in its holocene context: Combination of temperature indicators ("proxies") for north-western Europe from Greenland icecores and Alpine glacier extensions, with three subdivision proposals from three disciplines.

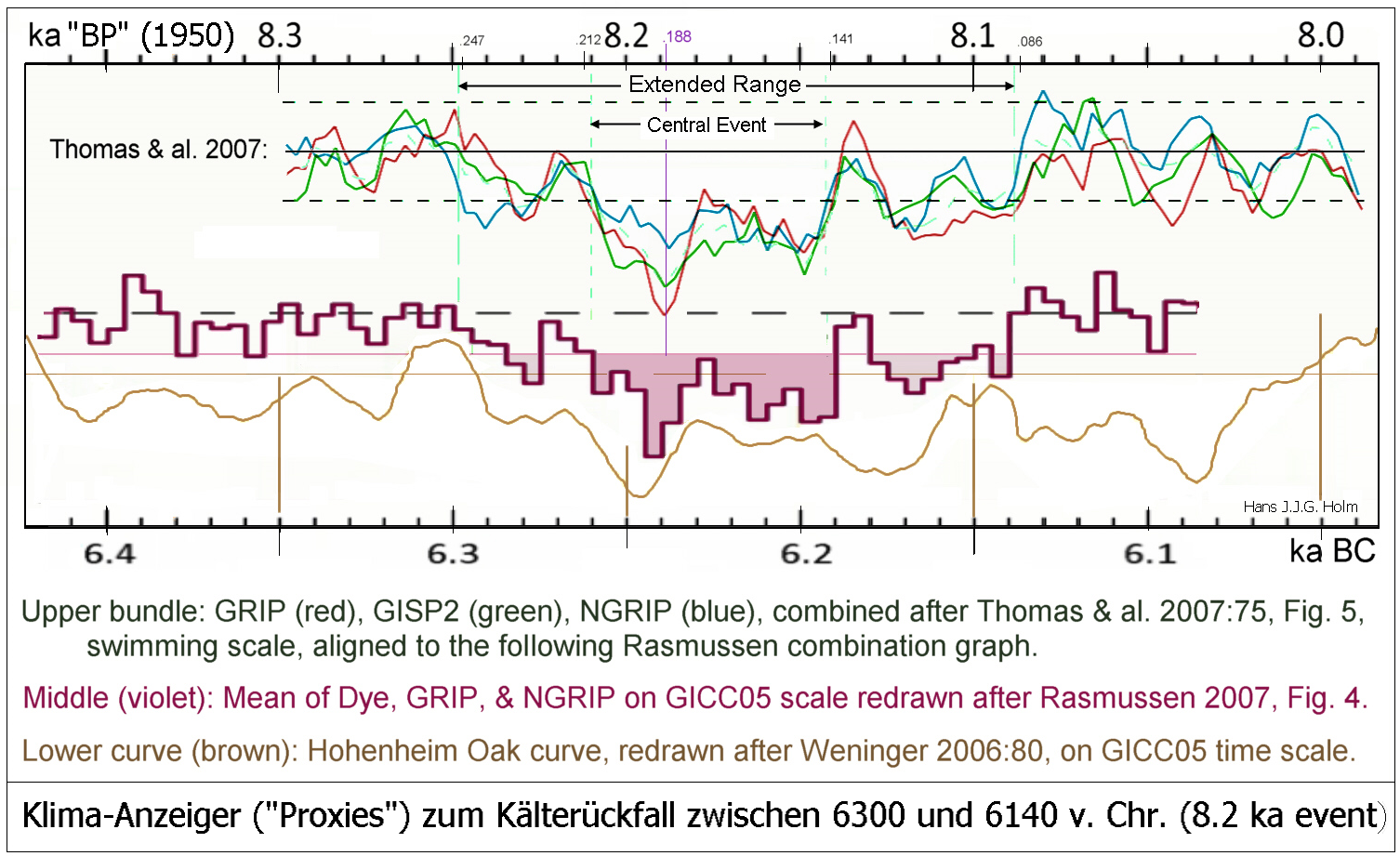
The 8.2 ky-event in detail: This is the most prominent temperature fallback (regression) of the Holocene immediately preceding the Atlantic temperature peak.

== Identification ==
A rapid cooling around 8,200 BP was first identified by Swiss botanist Heinrich Zoller in 1960, who named the event the Misox oscillation for the Val Mesolcina. It is also known as the Finse event in Norway. Evidence for the 8.2 kiloyear event has been found in speleothem records across Eurasia, the Mediterranean, South America, and southern Africa, indicating the event was globally synchronous. The strongest evidence for the event comes from the North Atlantic region; the disruption in climate shows clearly in Greenland ice cores, sedimentary records, and other records of the temperate and tropical North Atlantic. There is less evidence in ice cores from Antarctica and South American records. The effects of the sudden temperature decrease were global, most notably sea level change.

== Cause ==
The event may have been caused by a large meltwater pulse, which probably resulted from the final collapse of the Laurentide Ice Sheet of northeastern North America, most likely when the glacial lakes Ojibway and Agassiz suddenly drained into the North Atlantic Ocean. The same type of action produced the Missoula floods which formed the Channeled Scablands of the Columbia River basin. The meltwater pulse may have affected the North Atlantic thermohaline circulation, reducing northward heat transport in the Atlantic and causing significant North Atlantic cooling. The resulting Atlantic meridional overturning circulation weakened by 55% to 62%. Estimates of the cooling vary and depend somewhat on the interpretation of the proxy data, but decreases of around 1 to 5 °C (1.8 to 9.0 °F) have been reported. In Greenland, the event started at 8,175 BP, and the cooling was 3.3 °C below the decadal average in less than 20 years. The coldest period lasted for about 60 years, and its duration was about 150 years. Researchers suggest that the discharge was probably superimposed upon a longer episode of cooler climate lasting up to 600 years, and it was merely one contributing factor to the event as a whole.

Further afield from the Laurentide Ice Sheet, some tropical records report a 3 °C (5.4 °F) cooling, based on cores drilled into an ancient coral reef in Indonesia. The event caused a global CO_{2} decline of about 25 ppm over about 300 years. However, dating and interpretation of other tropical sites are more ambiguous than the North Atlantic sites. Climate modeling shows that the amount of meltwater and the pathway of meltwater are both important in perturbing the North Atlantic thermohaline circulation.

The initial meltwater pulse caused between 0.5 and 4 m (1 ft 8 in and 13 ft 1 in) of sea-level rise. Based on estimates of lake volume and decaying ice cap size, values of 0.4–1.2 m (1 ft 4 in – 3 ft 11 in) circulate. Based on sea-level data from the Mississippi Delta, the end of the Lake Agassiz–Ojibway drainage occurred at 8,310 to 8,180 BP and ranges from 0.8 to 2.2 m. The sea-level data from the Rhine–Meuse Delta indicate a 2–4 m (6 ft 7 in – 13 ft 1 in) of near-instantaneous rise at 8,540 to 8,200 BP, in addition to 'normal' post-glacial sea-level rise. Meltwater pulse sea-level rise was experienced fully at a great distance from the release area. Gravity and rebound effects associated with the shifting of water masses meant that the sea-level rise was smaller in areas closer to the Hudson Bay. The Mississippi Delta records around 20%, Northwestern Europe 70%, and Asia 105% of the globally averaged amount. The cooling of the 8.2-kiloyear event was a temporary feature, but the sea-level rise of the meltwater pulse was permanent.

In 2003, the Office of Net Assessment (ONA) at the United States Department of Defense was commissioned to produce a study on the likely and potential effects of modern climate change. The study, conducted under ONA head Andrew Marshall, modeled its prospective climate change on the 8.2 kiloyear event because it was the middle alternative between the Younger Dryas and the milder Little Ice Age.

== Effects ==
Across much of the world, the 8.2 kiloyear event engendered drier environmental conditions. Northern Hemisphere monsoon precipitation declined by 12.4% for every °C of global mean temperature change, while Southern Hemisphere monsoon precipitation rose by 4.2%/°C. The 8.2 kiloyear event was also associated with an increase in ocean salinity and terrestrial dust flux.

=== North Africa and Mesopotamia ===
Drier conditions were notable in North Africa; the area around the Charef River in eastern Morocco records an episode of extreme aridity around 8,200 BP. East Africa was significantly affected by five centuries of general drought. In West Asia, especially Mesopotamia, the event precluded a 300-year aridification and cooling episode which may have provided the natural force for Mesopotamian irrigation agriculture and surplus production, which were essential for the earliest formation of classes and urban life. However, changes taking place over centuries around the period are difficult to link specifically to the approximately 100-year abrupt event, as recorded most clearly in the Greenland ice cores.

In particular, in Tell Sabi Abyad, Syria, significant cultural changes were observed at c. 6200 BC; the settlement was not abandoned at the time.

=== Madagascar ===
In northwestern Madagascar, the event is associated with a negative δ^{18}O excursion and calcite deposition, indicating wet, humid conditions caused by the southward migration of the Intertropical Convergence Zone. Summer monsoons in the Southern Hemisphere likely became stronger, contributing to precipitation increases. Humidification was two-phased, with an 8.3 kiloyear sub-event preceding the 8.2 kiloyear event by about 20 years.

=== Europe ===
The sediment core records of the Fram Strait show a short-lived cooling during the 8.2 kiloyear event superimposed on a broader interval of warm climate. In western Scotland, the event coincided with a dramatic reduction in the Mesolithic population. Around Lake Mondsee in the Alps, deciduous forests declined while boreal vegetation took over. In the Iberian Peninsula, the event is linked to greater summer aridity that caused an increase in the frequency of fires and a consequent expansion of fire-resistant evergreen oak trees. At Tenaghi Philippon in northeastern Greece, average winter temperatures dropped by over 4 °C, likely due to increased influence of the Siberian High.

=== Asia ===
Lacustrine sediment records show that western Siberia underwent humidification, and southeastern Siberia experienced a precipitation decline. Carbonates from the Riwasa palaeolake show a weakening of the Indian Summer Monsoon (ISM). Stalagmites from Kotumsar Cave and from Socotra and Oman further confirm the ISM precipitously diminished in strength. A sediment core from Lop Nur in the Tarim Basin shows a major dry spell. The impact on forests in the Korean Peninsula was severe, shown by a sizeable reduction in pollen production. It took approximately 400 years for forest ecosystems to recover from the event to their state before the climatic perturbation.

Evidence from the Gulf of Thailand reveals a sea level drop concordant with the event. Also detectable from palynological and sedimentological records is an increase in runoff. Rainfall in the Indo-Pacific Warm Pool decreased for about 200 years, though this hydroclimatic response lagged the North Atlantic cooling by about 100 years.

=== North America ===
In Greenland, the event is associated with a large negative spike in ice core δ^{18}O values. Elk Lake in Minnesota shifted from being well stratified to well mixed, and the area around it went from boreal forest to open prairie. The waters off Cape Hatteras experienced a major increase in salinity. Bat guano δ^{13}C and δD values in the Grand Canyon declined. Southwestern Mexico became significantly drier, evidenced by the interruption of stalagmite growth. In the Gulf of Mexico, bay-head deltas back stepped as sea levels rose. Mustang Island was breached and ceased to be an effective salinity barrier. Gulf of Mexico δ^{18}O_{seawater} values dropped by 0.8%.

=== South America ===
In the western cordillera of Colombia, the event coincides with a major dry event. The South American Summer Monsoon drastically intensified as revealed by sediment records from Juréia paleolagoon.

== See also ==
- 4.2-kiloyear event
- African humid period
- Antarctic Cold Reversal
- Bond event
- Older Peron
- Piora Oscillation
- Sahara pump theory
- Storegga Slide
