= Aridification =

Long-term process of a region becoming increasingly arid

Aridification is the process of a region becoming increasingly arid, or dry. It refers to long term change, rather than seasonal variation.

It is often measured as the reduction of average soil moisture content. It can be caused by reduced precipitation, increased evaporation, lowering of water tables, and changes in ground cover acting individually or in combination. Its major consequences include reduced agricultural production, soil degradation, ecosystem changes and decreased water catchment runoff.

Some researchers have found that the Colorado River basin and other parts of western North America are currently undergoing aridification.

A December 2024 report from the UNCCD concluded that more than three-quarters of the Earth's land "has become permanently dryer in recent decades", that "drier climates now affecting vast regions across the globe will not return to how they were", and that a quarter of the global population lives in expanding drylands.

== See also ==
- Arid
- Aridity index
- Central Arid Zone Research Institute
- Arid Forest Research Institute
- Desert
- Desertification
- Global warming
- Groundwater
- Soil moisture
- Water balance
- Water content
- Water cycle
