= Early expansions of hominins out of Africa =

First hominin expansion into Eurasia (2.1–0.1 Ma)

Successive dispersals of Homo erectus (yellow), Homo neanderthalensis (ochre) and Homo sapiens (red, Out of Africa II), with the numbers of years since they appeared before present.

Several expansions of populations of archaic humans (genus Homo) out of Africa and throughout Eurasia took place in the course of the Lower Paleolithic, and into the beginning Middle Paleolithic, between about 2.1 million and 0.2 million years ago (Ma). These expansions are collectively known as Out of Africa I, in contrast to the expansion of anatomically modern humans (Homo sapiens) into Eurasia, which may have begun shortly after 0.2 million years ago (known in this context as "Out of Africa II").

The earliest presence of Homo (or indeed any hominin) outside of Africa dates to close to 2 million years ago. A 2018 study identified possible hominin presence at Shangchen, central China, as early as 2.12 Ma based on magnetostratigraphic dating of the lowest layer containing what may possibly be stone artefacts. The oldest known human skeletal remains outside of Africa are from Dmanisi, Georgia (Dmanisi skull 4), and are dated to 1.8 Ma. These remains are classified as Homo erectus georgicus.

Later waves of expansion are proposed around 1.4 Ma (early Acheulean industries), associated with Homo antecessor and 0.8 Ma (cleaver-producing Acheulean groups), associated with Homo heidelbergensis.

Until the early 1980s, early humans were thought to have been restricted to the African continent in the Early Pleistocene, or until about 0.8 Ma; Hominin migrations outside East Africa were apparently rare in the Early Pleistocene, leaving a fragmentary record of events.

== Early dispersals ==
Pre-Homo hominin expansion out of Africa is suggested by the presence of Graecopithecus and Ouranopithecus, found in Greece and Anatolia and dated to c. 8 million years ago, but these are probably Homininae but not Hominini. Possibly related are the Trachilos footprints found in Crete, dated to close to 6 million years ago; the age of the footprints was later reestimated to be 6.05 million years ago, 0.35 million years older than previous estimations. Another reestimation by Willem Jan Zachariasse and Lucas Lourens interpret the purported footprints to have originated 3 million years ago and doubt if they were footprints or the hominins had made the footprints because of the shallow marine setting and the separation of Crete from mainland Greece and Turkey in the Late Pliocene by the South Aegean Basin.

Australopithecina emerged about 5.6 million years ago, in East Africa (Afar Depression). Gracile australopithecines (Australopithecus afarensis) emerged in the same region, around 4 million years ago. The earliest known retouched tools were found in Lomekwi, Kenya, and date back to 3.3 Ma, in the late Pliocene. They might be the product of Australopithecus garhi or Paranthropus aethiopicus, the two known hominins contemporary with the tools. Genus Homo is assumed to have emerged by around 2.8 million years ago, with Homo habilis being found at Lake Turkana, Kenya. The delineation of the "human" genus, Homo, from Australopithecus is somewhat contentious, for which reason the superordinate term "hominin" is often used to include both. "Hominin" technically includes chimpanzees as well as pre-human species as old as 10 million years old (the separation of Homininae into Hominini and Gorillini).

The earliest known hominin presence outside of Africa dates to close to 2 million years ago. A 2018 study claims evidence for human presence at Shangchen, central China, as early as 2.12 Ma based on magnetostratigraphic dating of the lowest layer containing stone artefacts.

It has been suggested that Homo floresiensis was descended from such an early expansion. It is not clear whether these earliest hominins leaving Africa should be considered Homo habilis, or a form of early Homo or late Australopithecus closely related to Homo habilis, or a very early form of Homo erectus. In any case, the morphology of H. floresiensis has been found to show greatest similarity with Australopithecus sediba, Homo habilis and Dmanisi Man, raising the possibility that the ancestors of H. floresiensis left Africa before the appearance of H. erectus. A phylogenetic analysis published in 2017 suggests that H. floresiensis was descended from a species (presumably Australopithecine) ancestral to Homo habilis, making it a "sister species" either to H. habilis or to a minimally habilis-erectus-ergaster-sapiens clade, and its line is older than H. erectus itself. On the basis of this classification, H. floresiensis is hypothesized to represent a hitherto unknown and very early migration out of Africa, dating to before 2.1 million years ago. A similar conclusion is suggested by the date of 2.1 Ma for the oldest Shangchen artefacts.

== Homo erectus ==
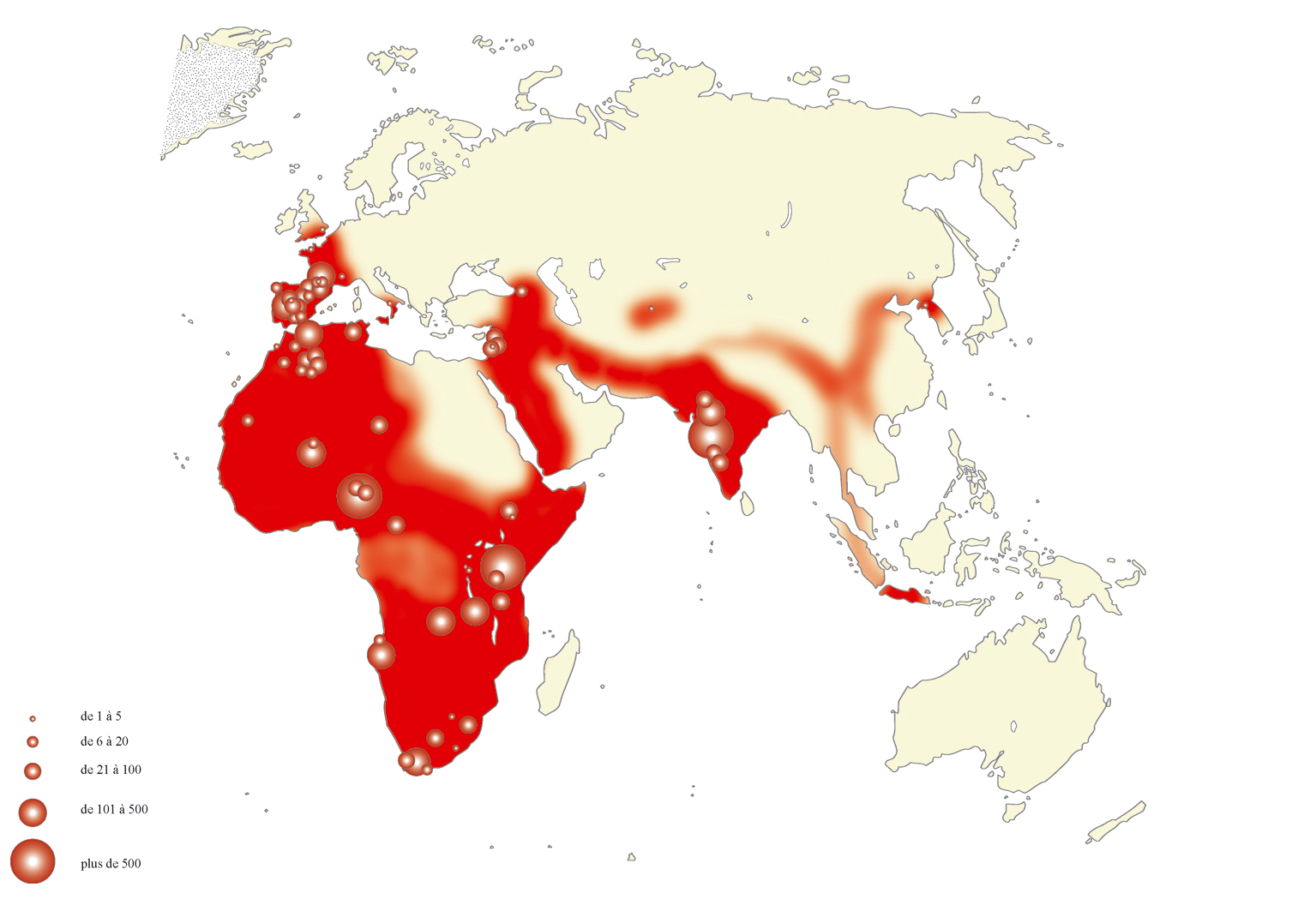
Map of the distribution of Middle Pleistocene (Acheulean) cleaver finds

Homo erectus emerges just after 2 million years ago. Early H. erectus would have lived face to face with H. habilis in East Africa for nearly half a million years. The oldest Homo erectus fossils appear almost contemporaneously, shortly after two million years ago, both in Africa and in the Caucasus.

=== Dmanisi and social complexity ===
The earliest documented Eurasian H. erectus were the Dmanisi hominins near the city of Dmanisi, Georgia, securely dated to 1.8 Ma. One specimen (composite skull D 3444/D 3900) excavated at Dmanisi has been framed as evidence for human social care of the elderly or disabled, a social adaptation likely important for success in diverse and novel ecosystems. The specimen shows signs of advanced age and severe periodontal disease based on extensive bone loss in the maxilla and mandible from resorption of the tooth alveoli, something very commonly seen in elderly humans and appearing as a loss of height in the upper lip and an increased gonial angle. It has been cited as the earliest edentulous human skull, a term which refers to long-term lifespan and pathophysiological effects of tooth loss rather than an specimen where simply no teeth remains, such as from a traumatic injury. In the publication first describing the remains, David Lordkipanidze and colleagues suggested that this individual likely could not have survived without supportive care and perhaps preparation of pulverized food, in addition to other assistance likely needed for survival at very advanced age in a Lower Paleolithic context. It has been suggested that this type of social complexity would have been necessary for the successful adaptation of H. erectus and descendant groups to the wide variety of ecosystems they eventually inhabited.

=== Expansion ===
The earliest known evidence for African H. erectus, dubbed Homo ergaster, is a single occipital bone (KNM-ER 2598), described as "H. erectus-like", and dated to about 1.9 Ma (contemporary with Homo rudolfensis). This is followed by a fossil gap, the next available fossil being KNM-ER 3733, a skull dated to 1.6 Ma. Early Pleistocene sites in North Africa, the geographical intermediate of East Africa and Georgia, are in poor stratigraphic context. The earliest of the dated is Ain Hanech in northern Algeria (c. 1.8 – 1.2 Ma), an Oldowan grade layer. These sites attest that early Homo erectus have crossed the North African tracts, which are usually hot and dry. There is little time between Homo erectus' apparent arrival in South Caucasus around 1.8 Ma, and its probable arrival in East and Southeast Asia. There is evidence of H. erectus in Yuanmou, China, dating to 1.7 Ma and in Sangiran, on Java, Indonesia, from 1.66 Ma.

Ferring et al. (2011) suggest that it was still Homo habilis that reached West Asia, and that early H. erectus developed there. H. erectus would then have dispersed from West Asia, to East Asia (Peking Man) Southeast Asia (Java Man), back to Africa (Homo ergaster), and to Europe (Tautavel Man).

It appears H. erectus took longer to move into Europe, the earliest site being Barranco León in southeastern Spain dated to 1.4 Ma, associated with Homo antecessor, and a controversial Pirro Nord in Southern Italy, allegedly from 1.7 – 1.3 Ma. The paleobiogeography of early human dispersals in western Eurasia characterizes H. ex gr. erectus as a temperature sensitive stenobiont, that failed to disperse north of the Alpide Belt. The geographically restricted earliest human presence in the Iberian Peninsula should be regarded as evidence of a sustainable presence of human population in this isolated area. The Pannonian plain, situated south-west of the Carpathian Mountains, was apparently characterized by a comparatively warm climate similar to that of the Mediterranean Area, while the climate of the western European paleobiogeographic area was mitigated by Gulf Stream influence and could support the episodic hominin dispersals toward the Iberian Peninsula. Apparently, the faunal exchanges between southeastern Europe and the Near East and southern Asia were controlled by the complex interaction of such geographic obstacles as the Bosporus and the Manych Strait, the climate barrier from the north of the Greater Caucasus range, and the 41 kyr glacial Milankovitch cycles that repeatedly closed the Bosporus and thus triggered the two-way faunal exchange between southeastern Europe and the Near East, and, apparently, the further westward dispersal of the archaic hominins in Eurasia.

By 1 Ma, Homo erectus had spread across Eurasia (mostly restricted to latitudes south of the 50th parallel north). It is hard to say, however, whether settlement was continuous in Western Europe, or if successive waves repopulated the territory in glacial interludes. Early Acheulean tools at Ubeidiya from 1.4 Ma is some evidence for a continuous settlement in the West, as successive waves out of Africa after then would likely have brought Acheulean technology to Western Europe.

He has reproduced a primitive dirigible (steerable) raft to demonstrate the feasibility of faring across the Lombok Strait on such a device, which he believes to have been done before 850 ka. The strait has maintained a width of at least 20 km for the whole of the Pleistocene.

== Homo heidelbergensis ==
Archaic humans in Europe beginning about 0.8 Ma (cleaver-producing Acheulean groups) are classified as a separate, erectus-derived species, known as Homo heidelbergensis. H. heidelbergensis from about 0.4 Ma develops its own characteristic industry, known as Clactonian. H. heidelbergensis is closely related to Homo rhodesiensis (also identified as Homo heidelbergensis sensu lato or African H. heidelbergensis), known to be present in southern Africa by 0.3 Ma.

Homo sapiens emerges in Africa before about 0.3 Ma from a lineage closely related to early H. heidelbergensis. The first wave of "Out of Africa II and "earliest presence of H. sapiens in West Asia, may date to between .3 and 0.2 Ma, and ascertained for 0.13 Ma. Genetic research also indicates that a later migration wave of H. sapiens (from .07-.05 Ma) from Africa is responsible for all to most of the ancestry of current non-African populations.

== Routes out of Africa ==
Most attention as to the route taken from Africa to West Asia is given to the Levantine land corridor and the Bab-el-Mandeb straits. The latter separates the Horn of Africa and Arabia, and may have allowed dry passage during some periods of the Pleistocene. Another candidate is the Strait of Gibraltar. A route across the Strait of Sicily was suggested in the 1970s but is now considered unlikely.

=== Levantine corridor ===
The use by hominins of the Levantine corridor, connecting Egypt via the Sinai Peninsula with the Eastern Mediterranean, has been associated to the phenomenon of rising and declining humidity of the desert belt of northern Africa, known as the Sahara pump. The numerous hominin sites in the Levant, such as Ubeidiya and Misliya Cave, are used as indicators of this migration route. As of 2012, the genetic analysis of human populations in Africa and Eurasia supports the concept that during the Paleolithic and Mesolithic periods, this route was more important for bi-directional human migrations between Africa and Eurasia than was the Horn of Africa.

=== Horn of Africa to Arabia (Bab el-Mandeb) ===
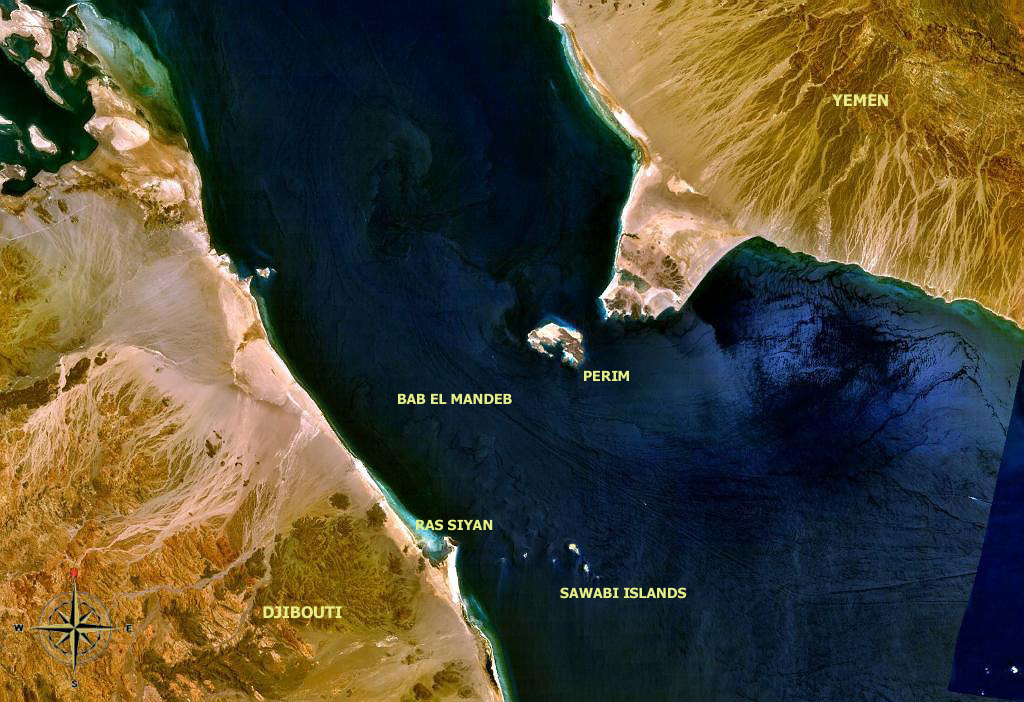
Bab-el-Mandeb strait

Bab-el-Mandeb is a 30 km strait between East Africa and the Arabian Peninsula, with a small island, Perim, 3 km off the Arabian bank. The strait has a major appeal in the study of Eurasian expansion in that it brings East Africa close to Eurasia. It does not require hopping from one water body to the next across the North African desert.

The land connection with Arabia disappeared in the Pliocene, and though it may have briefly reformed, the evaporation of the Red Sea and associated increase in salinity would have left traces in the fossil record after just 200 years and evaporite deposits after 600 years. Neither have been detected. A strong current flows from the Red Sea into the Indian Ocean and crossing would have been difficult without a land connection.

Oldowan grade tools are reported from Perim Island, implying that the strait could have been crossed in the Early Pleistocene, but these finds have yet to be confirmed.

=== Strait of Gibraltar ===
The Strait of Gibraltar is the Atlantic entryway to the Mediterranean, where Spanish and Moroccan banks are only 14 km apart. A decrease in sea levels in the Pleistocene due to glaciation would not have brought this down to less than 10 km. Deep currents push westwards, and surface water flows strongly back into the Mediterranean. Entrance into Eurasia across the strait of Gibraltar could explain the hominin remains at Barranco León in southeastern Spain (1.4 Ma) and Sima del Elefante in northern Spain (1.2 Ma). But the site of Pirro Nord in southern Italy, allegedly from 1.3 – 1.7 Ma, suggests a possible arrival from the East. Resolution is insufficient to settle the matter.

=== Strait of Sicily ===
Passage across the Strait of Sicily was suggested by Alimen (1975) based on the 1973 discovery of Oldowan grade tools in Sicily. Radiometric dates, however, have not been produced, and the artefacts might as well be from the Middle Pleistocene, and it is unlikely that there was a land bridge during the Pleistocene.

== Causes for dispersal ==
=== Climate change and hominin flexibility ===
For a given species in a given environment, available resources will limit the number of individuals that can survive indefinitely. This is the carrying capacity. Upon reaching this threshold, individuals may find it easier to gather resources in the poorer yet less exploited peripheral environment than in the preferred habitat. Homo habilis could have developed some baseline behavioural flexibility prior to its expansion into the peripheries (such as encroaching into the predatory guild). This flexibility could then have been positively selected and amplified, leading to Homo erectus' adaptation to the peripheral open habitats. A new and environmentally flexible hominin population could have come back to the old niche and replaced the ancestral population. Moreover, some step-wise shrinking of the woodland and the associated reduction of hominin carrying capacity in the woods around 1.8 Ma, 1.2 Ma, and 0.6 Ma would have stressed the carrying capacity's pressure for adapting to the open grounds. With Homo erectus' new environmental flexibility, favourable climate fluxes likely opened it the way to the Levantine corridor, perhaps sporadically, in the Early Pleistocene. There is evidence that the Mid-Pleistocene Revolution facilitated mammalian turnovers during the Late Early and Early Middle Pleistocene that may have included the hominin dispersals observed in the fossil record around this time.

=== Chasing fauna ===
Lithic analysis implies that Oldowan hominins were not predators. However, Homo erectus appears to have followed animal migrations to the north during wetter periods, likely as a source of scavenged food. The sabre-tooth cat Megantereon was an apex predator of the Early and Middle Pleistocene (before MIS 12). It became extinct in Africa c. 1.5 Ma, but had already moved out through the Sinai, and is among the faunal remains of the Levantine hominin site of Ubeidiya, c. 1.4 Ma. It could not break bone marrow and its kills were likely an important food source for hominins, especially in glacial periods. According to this hypothesis, hominins would also have successfully competed with the kleptoparasitic giant short-faced hyena, Pachycrocuta, for these carcasses. In colder Eurasian times, the hominin diet would have to be principally meat-based and Acheulean hunters must have competed with cats.

Some papers have argued against this hypothesis, showing that the dispersals of hominins from Africa into Eurasia were asynchronous with those of other land mammals and that the latter was thus unlikely to be the cause of the former.

=== Coevolved zoonotic diseases ===
Bar-Yosef and Belfer-Cohen suggest that the success of hominins within Eurasia once out of Africa is in part due to the absence of zoonotic diseases outside their original habitat. Zoonotic diseases are those that are transmitted from animals to humans. While a disease specific to hominins must keep its human host alive long enough to transmit itself, zoonotic diseases will not necessarily do so as they can complete their life cycle without humans. Still, these infections are well accustomed to human presence, having evolved alongside them. The higher an African ape's population density, the better a disease fares. 55% of chimps at the Gombe reserve die of disease, most of them zoonotic. The majority of these diseases are still restricted to hot and damp African environments. When hominins moved out into drier and colder habitats of higher latitudes, one major limiting factor in population growth was removed.

=== Physiological traits ===
While Homo habilis was certainly bipedal, its long arms are indicative of an arboreal adaptation. Homo erectus had longer legs and shorter arms, revealing a transition to obligate terrestriality, though it remains unclear how this change in relative leg length might have been an advantage. Sheer body size, on the other hand, seems to have allowed for better walking energy efficiency and endurance. A larger Homo erectus would also dehydrate more slowly and could thus cover greater distances before facing thermoregulatory limitations. The ability for prolonged walking at a normal pace would have been a decisive factor for effective colonisation of Eurasia.

== Effects ==
The appearance of early hominins in Eurasia coincided with a reduction in the diversity of the continent's carnivore guild. It has been postulated that this was related to the Oldowan-Acheulean transition, as the development of Acheulean technology signifies a change in human ecology from a passive, scavenging role to that of more active predation.

== See also ==
- Archaic humans in Southeast Asia
- Early human migrations
- Interbreeding between archaic and modern humans
