= List of periods and events in climate history =

The list of periods and events in climate history includes some notable climate events known to paleoclimatology. Knowledge of precise climatic events decreases as the record goes further back in time. The timeline of glaciation covers ice ages specifically, which tend to have their own names for phases, often with different names used for different parts of the world. The names for earlier periods and events come from geology and paleontology. The marine isotope stages (MIS) are often used to express dating within the Quaternary.

== Before 1 million years ago ==
500 million years of climate change

Ice core data for the past 400,000 years, with the present at right. Note length of glacial cycles averages ~100,000 years. Blue curve is temperature, green curve is CO_{2}, and red curve is windblown glacial dust (loess).

Scale: Millions of years before present, earlier dates approximate.

Date (Mya)	Event
Before 1,000	Faint young Sun paradox
2,400	Great Oxidation Event probably leads to Huronian glaciation perhaps covering the whole globe
650–600	Later Neoproterozoic Snowball Earth or Marinoan glaciation, precursor to the Cambrian explosion
517	End-Botomian mass extinction; like the next two, little understood
502	Dresbachian extinction event
486.85	Cambrian–Ordovician extinction event
450–440	Ordovician–Silurian extinction event, in two bursts, after cooling perhaps caused by tectonic plate movement
450	Andean-Saharan glaciation
360–260	Karoo Ice Age
305	Cooler climate causes Carboniferous rainforest collapse
251.9	Permian–Triassic extinction event
199.6	Triassic–Jurassic extinction event, causes as yet unclear
66	Perhaps 30,000 years of volcanic activity form the Deccan Traps in India, or a large meteor impact.
66	Cretaceous–Paleogene boundary and Cretaceous–Paleogene extinction event, extinction of non-avian dinosaurs
55.8	Paleocene–Eocene Thermal Maximum
53.7	Eocene Thermal Maximum 2
49	Azolla event may have ended a long warm period
5.3–2.6	Pliocene climate became cooler and drier, and seasonal, similar to modern climates.
2.5 to present	Quaternary glaciation, with permanent ice on the polar regions, many named stages in different parts of the world

== Pleistocene ==
All dates are approximate. "(B-S)" means this is one of the periods from the Blytt-Sernander sequence, originally based on studies of Danish peat bogs.

Date (BC)	Event
118,000–88,000	Abbassia Pluvial wet in North Africa
108,000–8,000	Last Glacial Period, not to be confused with the Last Glacial Maximum or Late Glacial Maximum below. (The following events also fall into this period.)
48,000–28,000	Mousterian Pluvial wet in North Africa
26,500–19,000	Last Glacial Maximum, what is often meant in popular usage by "Last Ice Age"
16,000–13,000	Oldest Dryas cold, begins slowly and ends sharply (B-S)
12,700	Antarctic Cold Reversal warmer Antarctic, sea level rise
12,400	Bølling oscillation warm and wet in the North Atlantic, begins the Bølling-Allerød period (B-S)
12,400–11,500 (much discussed)	Older Dryas cold, interrupts warm period for some centuries (B-S)
12,000–11,000	Allerød oscillation warm & moist (B-S)
11,400–9,500	Huelmo–Mascardi Cold Reversal cold in Southern Hemisphere
10,800–9,500	Younger Dryas sudden cold and dry period in Northern Hemisphere (B-S)
9,500–5,500	Holocene climatic optimum A warm period about 4.9 °C warmer than the LGM

== Holocene ==
All dates are BC (BCE) and approximate. "(B-S)" means this is one of the periods from the Blytt-Sernander sequence, originally based on studies of Danish peat bogs.

Date (BC)	Event
From 10,000	Holocene glacial retreat, the present Holocene or Postglacial period begins
9400	Pre-Boreal sharp rise in temperature over 50 years (B-S), precedes Boreal
8500–6900	Boreal (B-S), rising sea levels, forest replaces tundra in northern Europe
7500–3900	Neolithic Subpluvial/African humid period in North Africa, wet
7000–3000	Holocene climatic optimum, or Atlantic in northern Europe (B-S)
6200	8.2-kiloyear event cold
5000–4100	Older Peron warm and wet, global sea levels were 2.5 to 4 meters (8.2 to 13.1 ft) higher than the twentieth-century average
3900	5.9 kiloyear event dry and cold.
3500	End of the African humid period, Neolithic Subpluvial in North Africa, expands Sahara Desert
3000 – 0	Neopluvial in North America
3,200–2,900	Piora Oscillation, cold, perhaps not global. Wetter in Europe, drier elsewhere, linked to the domestication of the horse in Central Asia.
2200	4.2-kiloyear event dry, lasted most of the 22nd century BC, linked to the end of the Old Kingdom in Egypt, and the Akkadian Empire in Mesopotamia, various archaeological cultures in Persia and China
1800–1500	Middle Bronze Age Cold Epoch, a period of unusually cold climate in the North Atlantic region
Bond Event 2	Possibly triggering the Late Bronze Age collapse
900–300	Iron Age Cold Epoch cold in North Atlantic. Perhaps associated with the Homeric Minimum
250 BC–400 AD	Roman Warm Period

=== Common Era/AD ===
- Climate changes of 535-536 (535–536 AD), sudden cooling and failure of harvests, perhaps caused by volcanic dust
- 900–1300 Medieval Warm Period, wet in Europe, arid in North America, may have depopulated the Great Plains of North America, associated with the Medieval renaissances in Europe
  - Great Famine of 1315–1317 in Europe
- Little Ice Age: Various dates between 1250 and 1550 or later are held to mark the start of the Little ice age, ending at equally varied dates around 1850
  - 1460–1550 Spörer Minimum cold
  - 1656–1715 Maunder Minimum low sunspot activity
  - 1790–1830 Dalton Minimum low sunspot activity, cold
  - 1816 Year Without a Summer, caused by volcanic dust of Mount Tambora eruption
- 1850–present Retreat of glaciers since 1850, instrumental temperature record
- Present and recent past global warming, perhaps to be named the Anthropocene period

== See also ==
- Climate change (modern day)
- Climate change (general concept)
- Climate across Cretaceous–Paleogene boundary
- Thermal history of Earth
- Geologic temperature record
- Timeline of prehistory
