= Upper Paleolithic =

Subdivision of the Paleolithic, or Old Stone Age

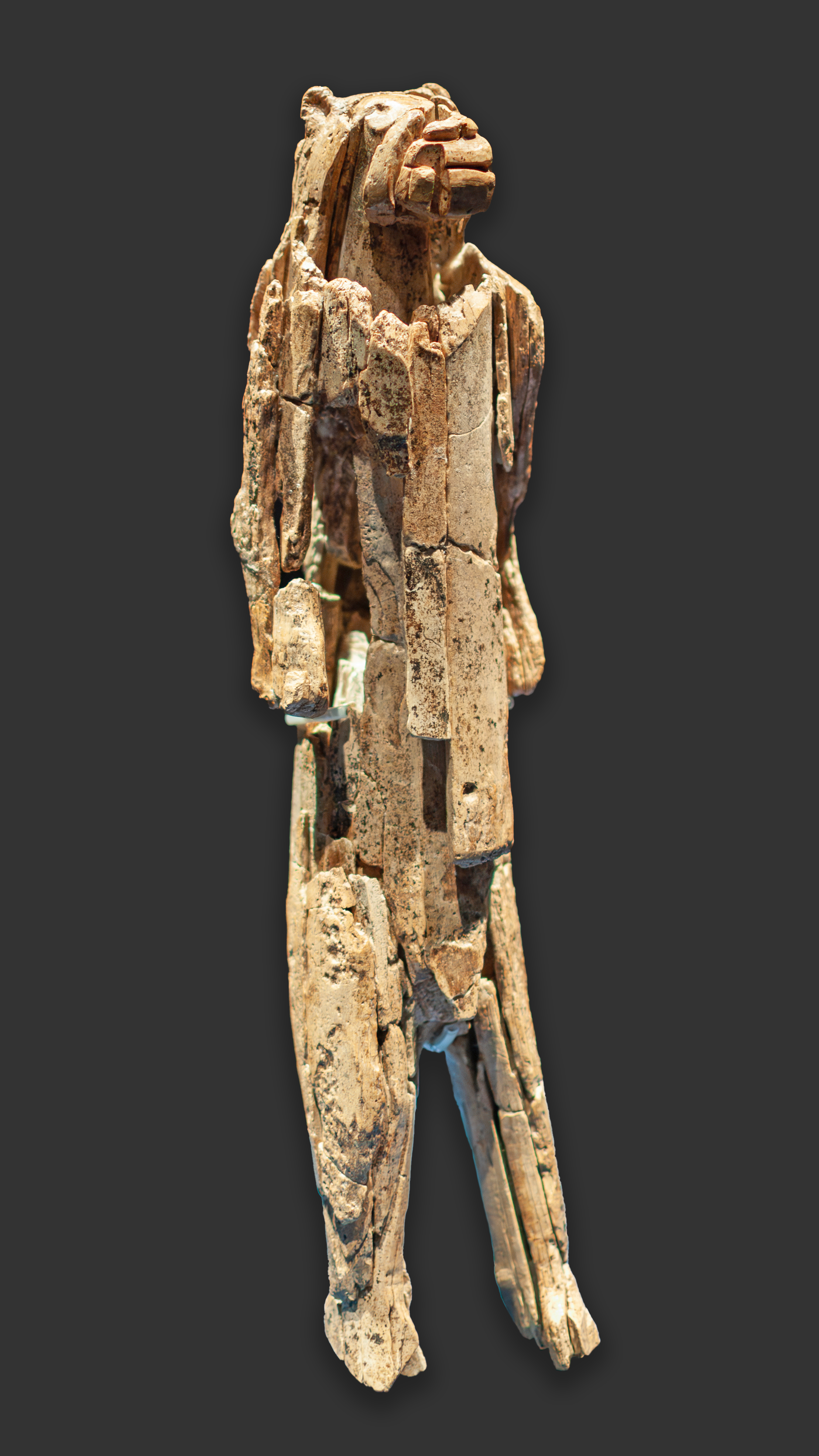
- Löwenmensch, a prehistoric ivory sculpture discovered in Hohlenstein-Stadel, c. 40,000–35,000 years old
- Period: Stone Age
- Dates: 50,000 to 12,000 BP
- Preceded by: Middle Paleolithic
- Followed by: Mesolithic; Epipalaeolithic

Selected Upper Paleolithic sites from the ROAD database (CC BY-SA 4.0 ROCEEH)

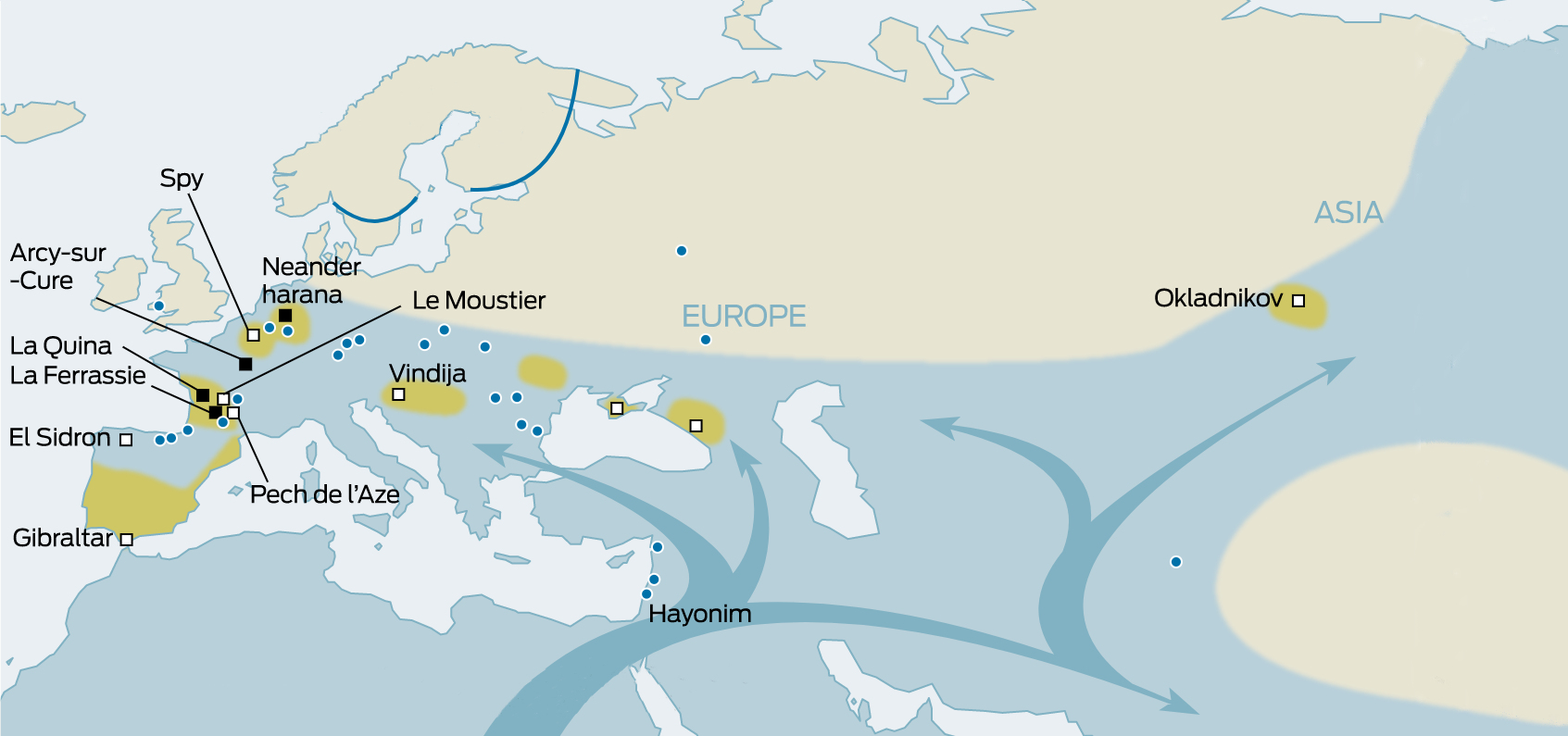
Expansion of early modern humans from Africa

The Upper Paleolithic (or Upper Palaeolithic) is the third and last subdivision of the Paleolithic or Old Stone Age. Very broadly, it dates to between 50,000 and 12,000 years ago (the beginning of the Holocene), according to some theories coinciding with the appearance of behavioral modernity in humans. It is followed by the Mesolithic.

Anatomically modern humans (i.e. Homo sapiens) are believed to have emerged in Africa around 300,000 years ago. It has been argued by some that their ways of life changed relatively little from that of archaic humans of the Middle Paleolithic, until about 50,000 years ago, when there was a marked increase in the diversity of artefacts found associated with modern human remains.

The Upper Paleolithic has the earliest known evidence of organized settlements, in the form of campsites, some with storage pits. Artistic work blossomed, with cave painting, petroglyphs, carvings and engravings on bone or ivory. The first evidence of human fishing is also found from a 125,000 years old artefacts in Buya, Eritrea, and in other places such as Blombos cave in South Africa. More complex social groupings emerged, supported by more varied and reliable food sources and specialized tool types. This probably contributed to increasing group identification or ethnicity.

The peopling of Australia most likely took place before c. 60 ka. Europe was peopled after c. 45 ka. Anatomically modern humans are known to have expanded northward into Siberia as far as the 58th parallel by about 45 ka (Ust'-Ishim man). The Upper Paleolithic is divided by the Last Glacial Maximum (LGM), from about 25 to 15 ka. The peopling of the Americas occurred during this time, with East and Central Asia populations reaching the Bering land bridge after about 35 ka, and expanding into the Americas by about 15 ka. In Western Eurasia, the Paleolithic eases into the so-called Epipaleolithic or Mesolithic from the end of the LGM, beginning 15 ka. The Holocene glacial retreat begins 11.7 ka (10th millennium BC), falling well into the Old World Epipaleolithic, and marking the beginning of the earliest forms of farming in the Fertile Crescent.

== Lifestyle and technology ==
Both Homo erectus and Neanderthals used the same crude stone tools. Archaeologist Richard G. Klein, who has worked extensively on ancient stone tools, describes the stone tool kit of archaic hominids as impossible to categorize. He argues that almost everywhere, whether Asia, Africa or Europe, before 50,000 years ago all the stone tools are much alike and unsophisticated.

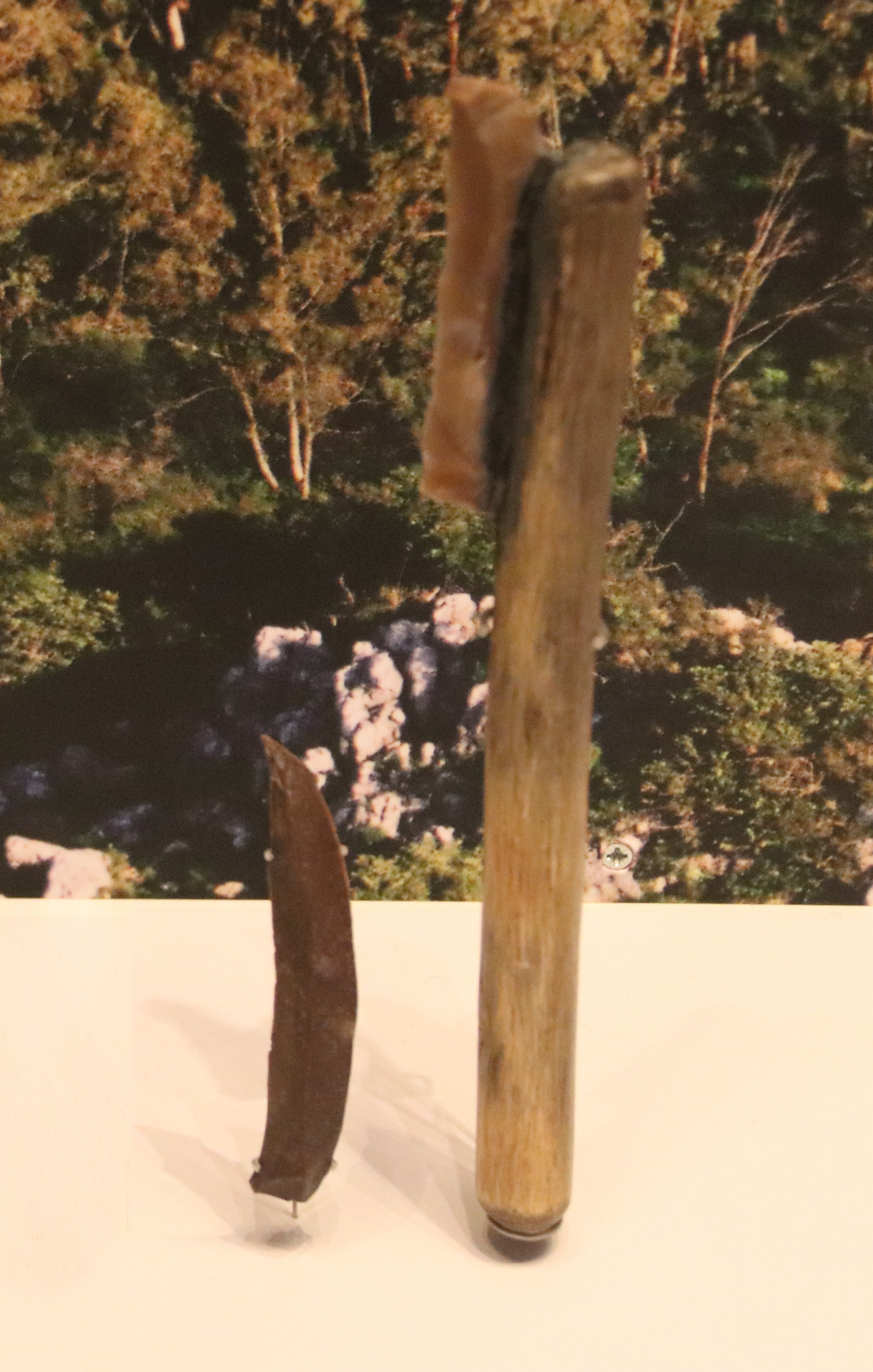
Flint Knives, Ahmarian Culture, Nahal Boqer, Israel, 47,000–40,000 BP. Israel Museum.

Firstly among the artefacts of Africa, archeologists found they could differentiate and classify those of less than 50,000 years into many different categories, such as projectile points, engraving tools, knife blades, and drilling and piercing tools. These new stone-tool types have been described as being distinctly differentiated from each other; each tool had a specific purpose. The early modern humans who expanded into Europe, commonly referred to as the Cro-Magnons, left many sophisticated stone tools, carved and engraved pieces on bone, ivory and antler, cave paintings and Venus figurines.

The Neanderthals continued to use Mousterian stone tool technology and possibly Châtelperronian technology. These tools disappeared from the archeological record at around the same time the Neanderthals themselves disappeared from the fossil record, about 40,000 cal BP.

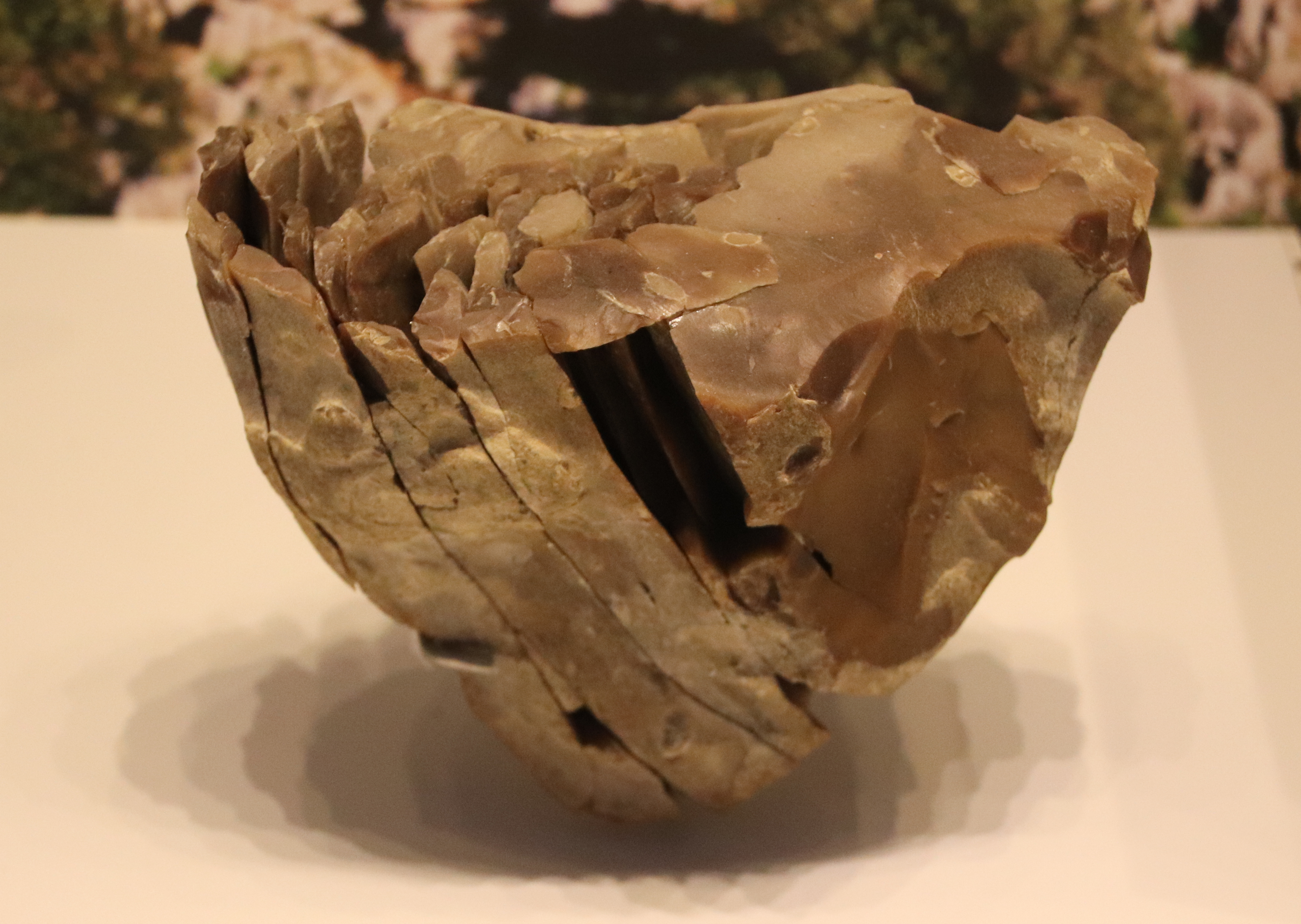
Stone core for making fine blades, Boqer Tachtit, Negev, Israel, c. 40,000 BP

Settlements were often located in narrow valley bottoms, possibly associated with hunting of passing herds of animals. Some of them may have been occupied year round, though more commonly they appear to have been used seasonally; people moved between the sites to exploit different food sources at different times of the year. Hunting was important, and caribou/wild reindeer "may well be the species of single greatest importance in the entire anthropological literature on hunting".

Technological advances included significant developments in flint tool manufacturing, with industries based on fine blades rather than simpler and shorter flakes. Burins and racloirs were used to work bone, antler and hides. Advanced darts and harpoons also appear in this period, along with the fish hook, the oil lamp, rope, and the eyed needle. Fishing of pelagic fish species and navigating the open ocean is evidenced by sites from Timor and Buka (Solomon Islands).

The changes in human behavior have been attributed to changes in climate, encompassing a number of global temperature drops. These led to a worsening of the already bitter cold of the last glacial period (popularly but incorrectly called the last ice age). Such changes may have reduced the supply of usable timber and forced people to look at other materials. In addition, flint becomes brittle at low temperatures and may not have functioned as a tool.

=== Notational signs ===
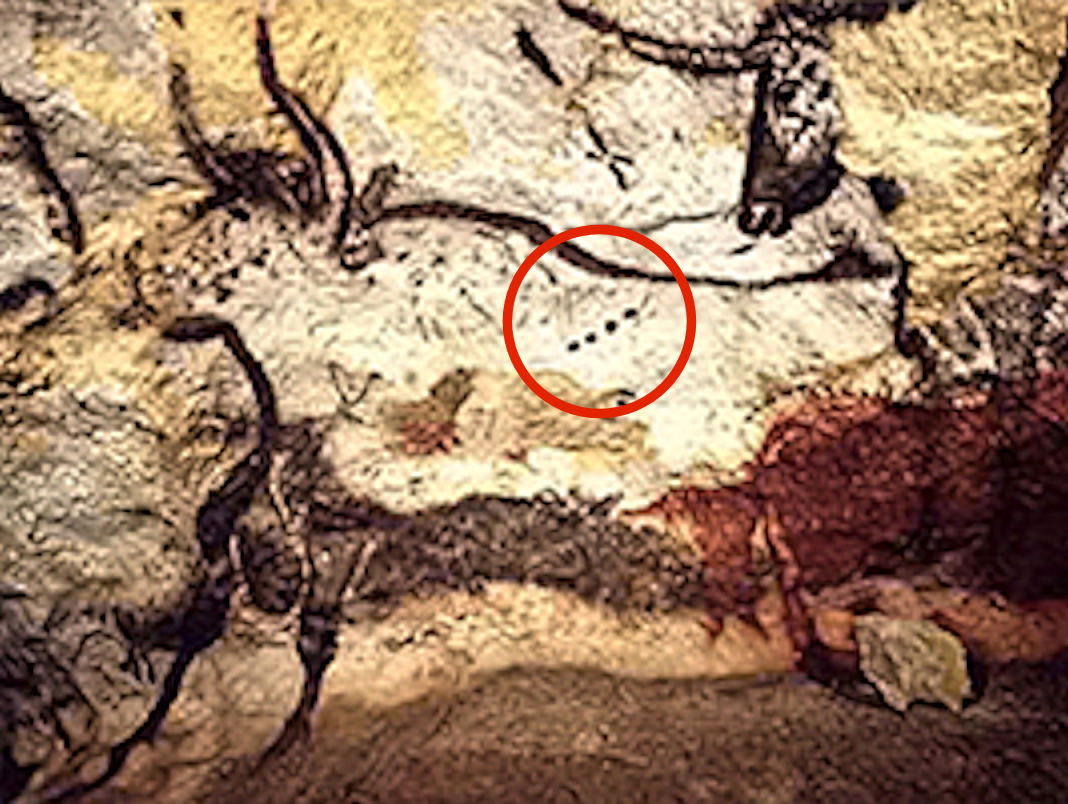
Art of Lascaux, with painted animal, and four dots, a possible notation for Lunar months

Some notational signs, used next to images of animals, may have appeared as early as the Upper Palaeolithic in Europe circa 35,000 BCE, and may be the earliest proto-writing: several symbols were used in combination as a way to convey seasonal behavioural information about hunted animals. Lines (|) and dots (•) were apparently used interchangeably to denote lunar months, while the (Y) sign apparently signified "To give birth". These characters were seemingly combined to convey the breeding period of hunted animals.

== Changes in climate and geography ==
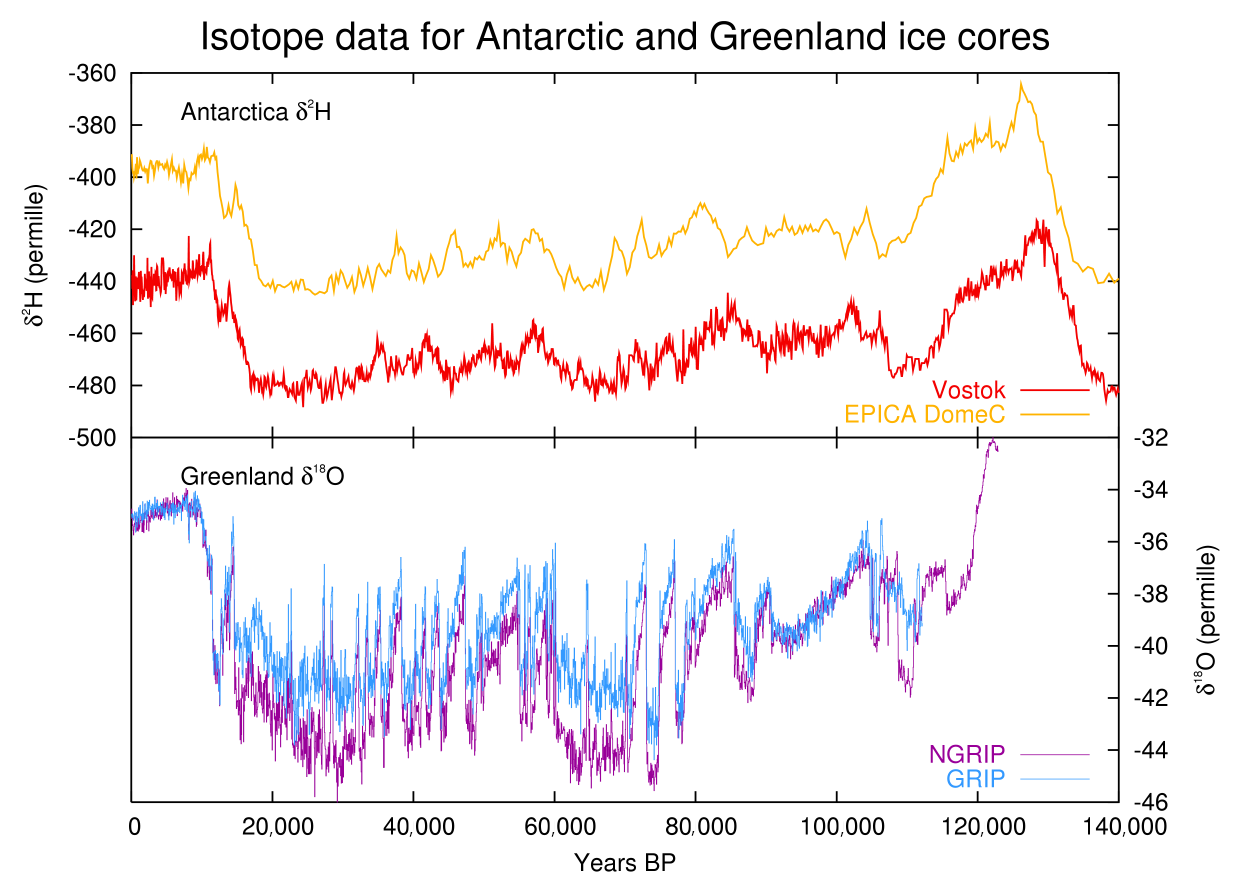
The Upper Paleolithic covered the second half of the Last glacial period from 50,000 to 10,000 before present, until the warming of the Holocene. Ice core data from Antarctica and Greenland.

The climate of the period in Europe saw dramatic changes, and included the Last Glacial Maximum, the coldest phase of the last glacial period, which lasted from about 26.5 to 19 kya, being coldest at the end, before relatively rapid warming (all dates vary somewhat for different areas, and in different studies). During the Maximum, most of Northern Europe was covered by an ice-sheet, forcing human populations into the areas known as Last Glacial Maximum refugia, including modern Italy and the Balkans, parts of the Iberian Peninsula and areas around the Black Sea.

This period saw cultures such as the Solutrean in France and Spain. Human life may have continued on top of the ice sheet, but we know next to nothing about it, and very little about the human life that preceded the European glaciers. In the early part of the period, up to about 30 kya, the Mousterian Pluvial made northern Africa, including the Sahara, well-watered and with lower temperatures than today; after the end of the Pluvial the Sahara became arid.

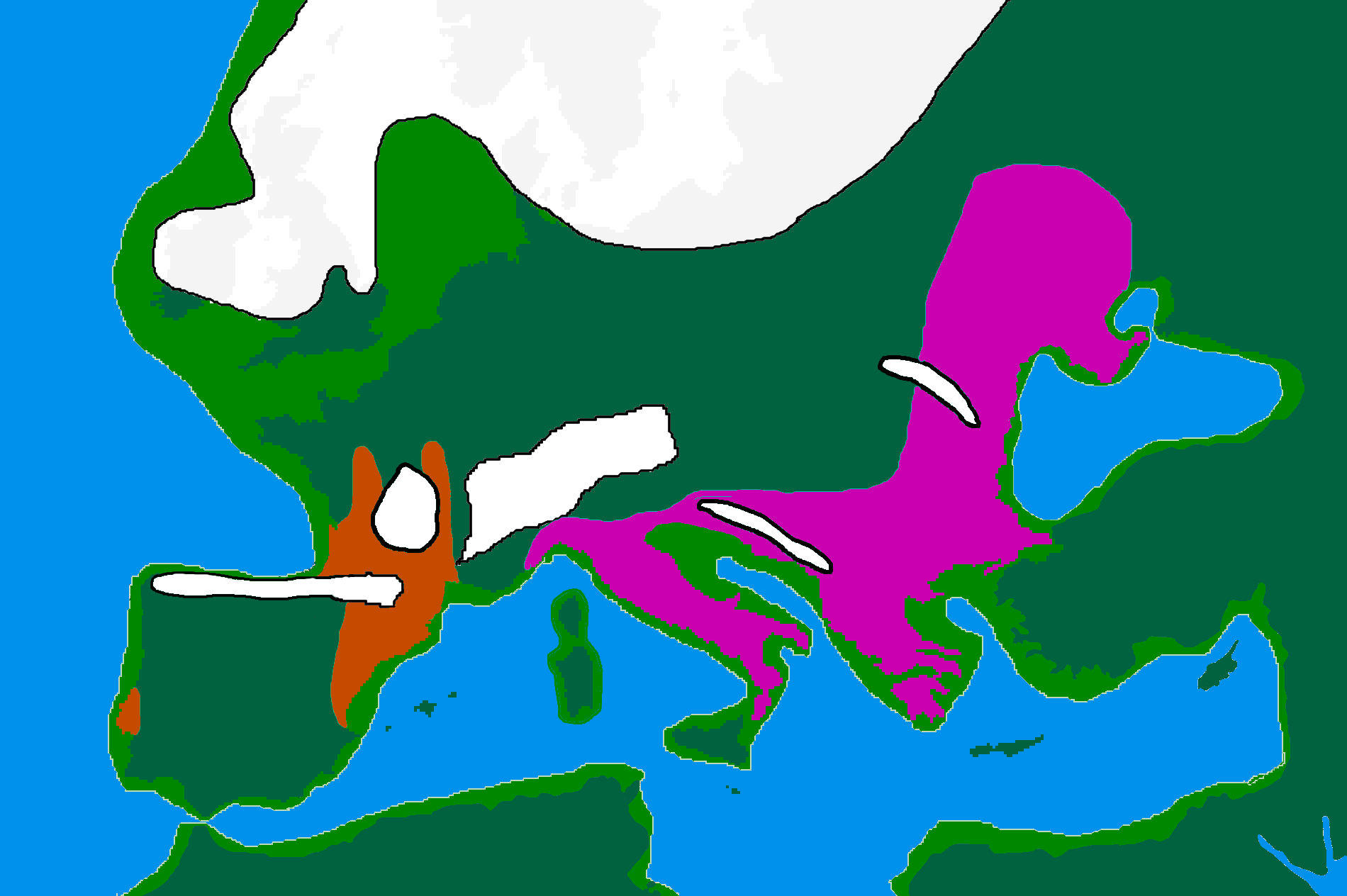
European Last Glacial Maximum refuges, 20,000 BP: Solutrean and Proto Solutrean Cultures Epigravettian Culture

The Last Glacial Maximum was followed by the cold Oldest Dryas and then the Bølling–Allerød, a warm and moist interstadial that occurred around 14.7 to 12.9 kya in the northern hemisphere. Then there was a very rapid onset, perhaps within as little as a decade, of the cold and dry Younger Dryas climate period, giving sub-arctic conditions to much of northern Europe. The Preboreal rise in temperatures also began sharply around 10.3 kya, and by its end around 9.0 kya had brought temperatures nearly to present day levels, although the climate was wetter. This period saw the Upper Paleolithic give way to the start of the following Mesolithic cultural period.

As the glaciers receded sea levels rose; the English Channel, Irish Sea and North Sea were land at this time, and the Black Sea a fresh-water lake. In particular the Atlantic coastline was initially far out to sea in modern terms in most areas, though the Mediterranean coastline has retreated far less, except in the north of the Adriatic and the Aegean. The rise in sea levels continued until at least 7.5 kya (5500 BC), so evidence of human activity along Europe's coasts in the Upper Paleolithic is mostly lost, though some traces have been recovered by fishing boats and marine archaeology, especially from Doggerland, the lost area beneath the North Sea.

== Timeline ==
=== 50,000–40,000 BP ===
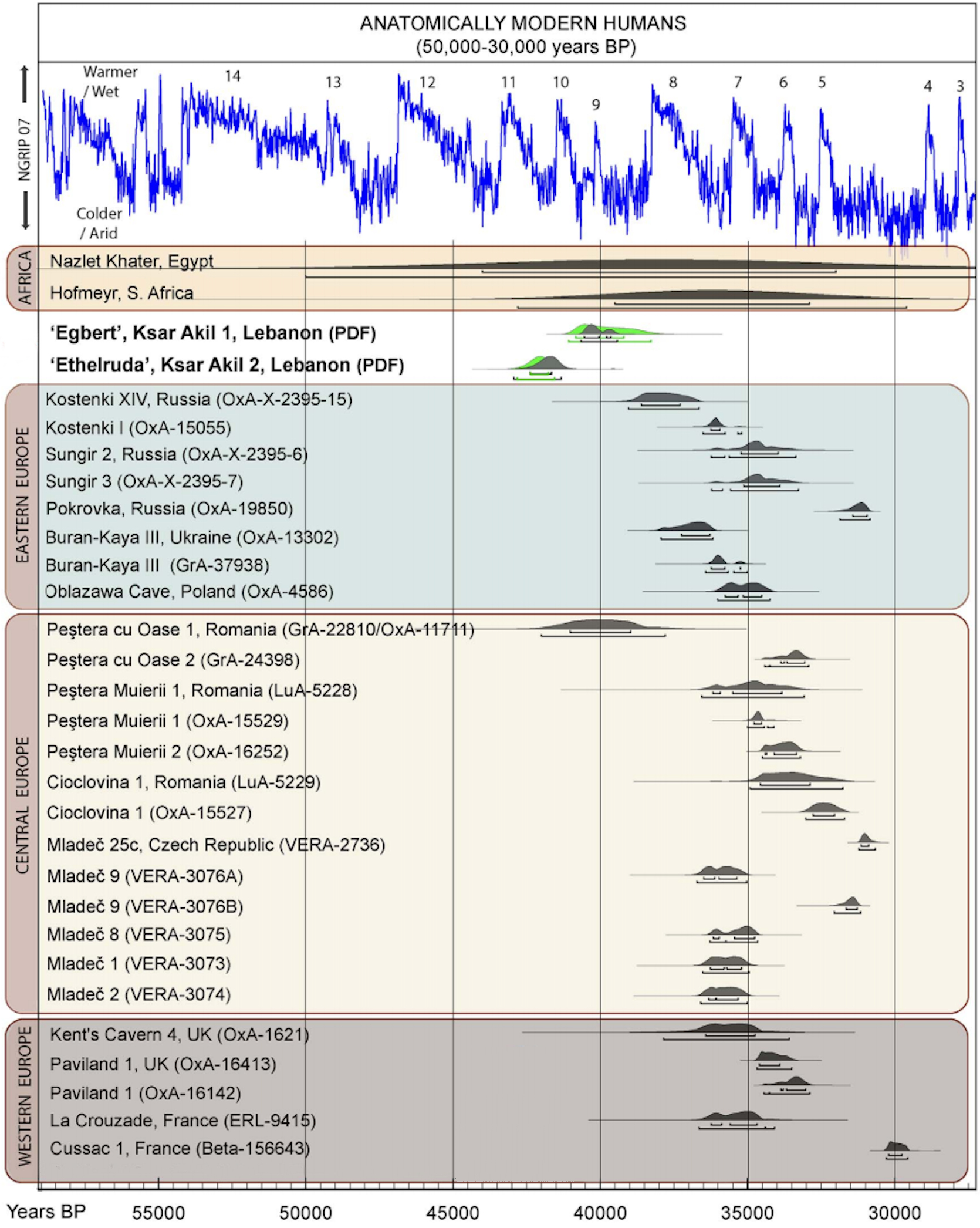
Known archaeological remains in Europe and Africa of anatomically modern humans: directly dated, calibrated carbon dates as of 2013

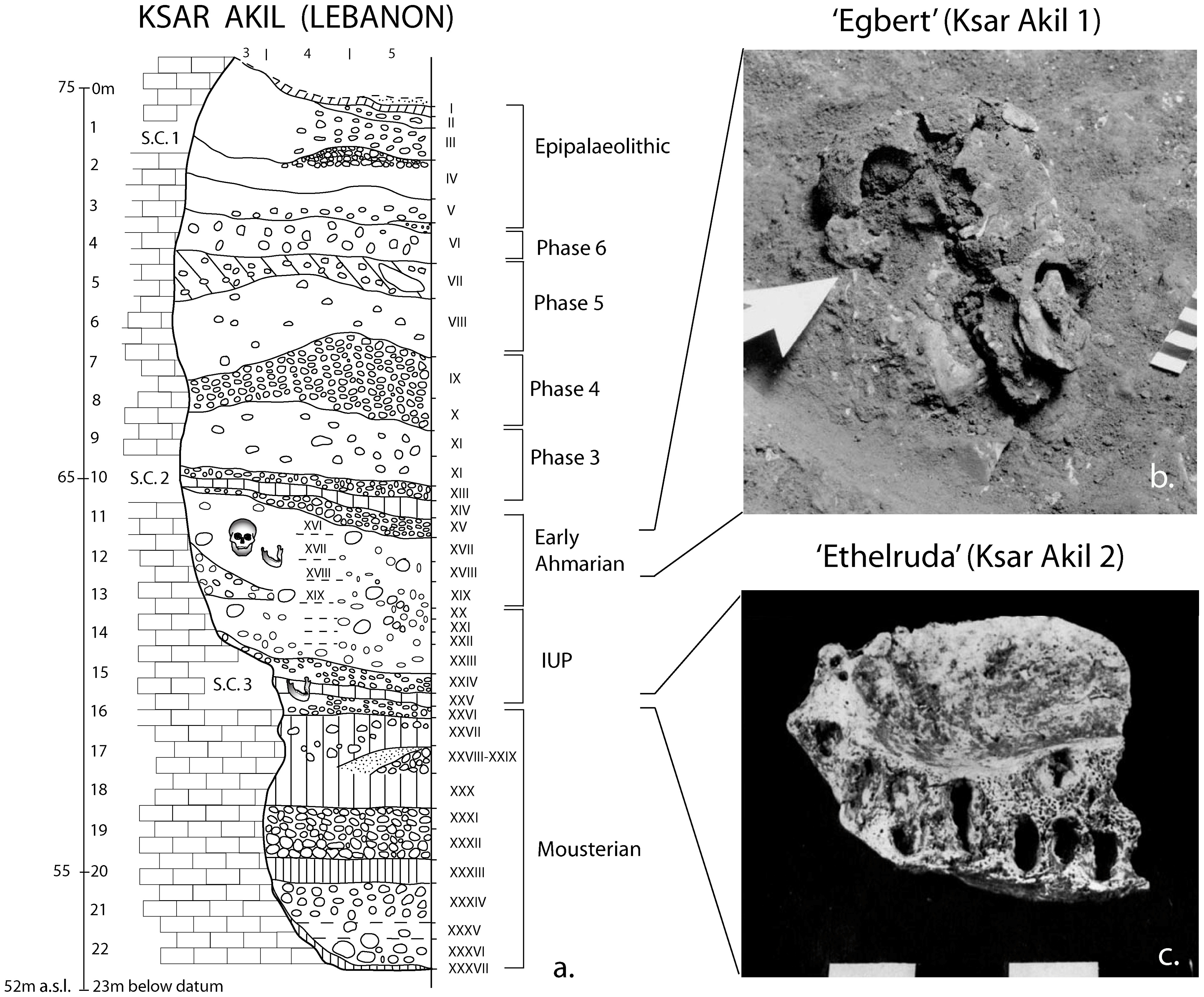
Layer sequence at Ksar Akil in the Levantine corridor, and discovery of two fossils of Homo sapiens, dated to 40,800 to 39,200 years BP for "Egbert",and 42,400–41,700 BP for "Ethelruda"

==== 50,000 BP ====
- Numerous Aboriginal stone tools were found in gravel sediments in Castlereagh, Sydney, Australia. At first when these results were new they were controversial; more recently dating of the same strata has revised and corroborated these dates.
- Start of the Mousterian Pluvial in North Africa.
- Occupants of the Fa-Hien Lena cave, Sri Lanka had developed bow and arrow technology 48,000 BP (though the earliest known bow and arrow technology dates to about 65,000 BP from Sibudu Cave, South Africa).

==== 48,000 BP ====
The first direct evidence for Neanderthals hunting cave lions. This is based on a cave lion skeleton found in Seigsdorf, Germany which has hunting lesions.

==== 45,000–43,000 BP ====
- Earliest evidence of modern humans found in Europe, in Southern Italy. These are indirectly dated.
- Earliest mathematical artifact, the notched Lebombo bone, a possible tally stick or lunar calendar, dated to 44,000–43,000 BP in Eswatini (Swaziland), southern Africa.
- Oldest-known mining in archaeological record, the Ngwenya Mine in Swaziland, at about 43,000 years ago, where humans mined hematite to make the red pigment ochre.
- Earliest directly dated figurative cave art of mankind at Leang Bulu' Sipong in Sulawesi, Indonesia.

=== 43,000–41,000 BP ===
- Microlithic artefacts have been excavated from Kana, West Bengal, India.
- Ornaments and skeletal remains of modern humans, at Ksar Akil in Lebanon. These are directly dated.
- Denisova hominins live in the Altai Mountains (Russia, China, Mongolia, and Kazakhstan).

=== 40,000–30,000 BP ===
==== 40,000–35,000 BP ====
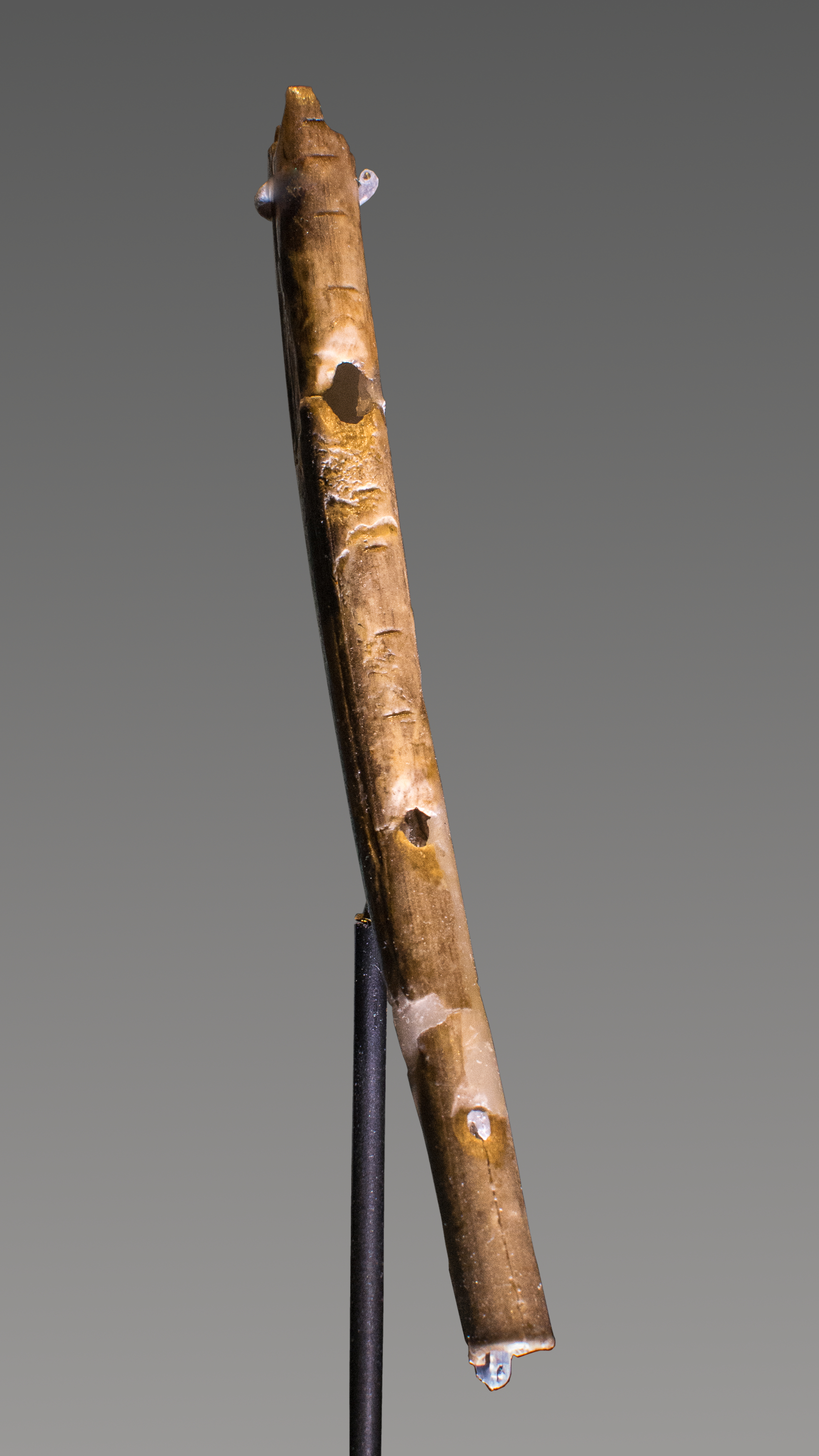
Bone flute, Aurignacian, c. 35,000 BC

- First human inhabitants in Perth, Australia, as evidenced by archaeological findings on the Upper Swan River.
- During this time period, Melbourne, Australia was occupied by hunter-gatherers.
- Early cultural centre in the Swabian Alps, oldest depiction of a human being (Venus of Hohle Fels), beginning of the Aurignacian.
- Löwenmensch figure created in Hohlenstein-Stadel, one of the earliest examples of figurative art. It is now in Ulmer Museum, Ulm, Germany.
- The first flutes appear in Germany.
- Notational signs in caves, apparently conveying calendaric meaning about the behaviour of animal species drawn next to them, are the first known proto-writing in history.
- Most of the giant vertebrates and megafauna in Australia became extinct.
- Fishing of pelagic fish species at Jerimalai shelter, Timor.
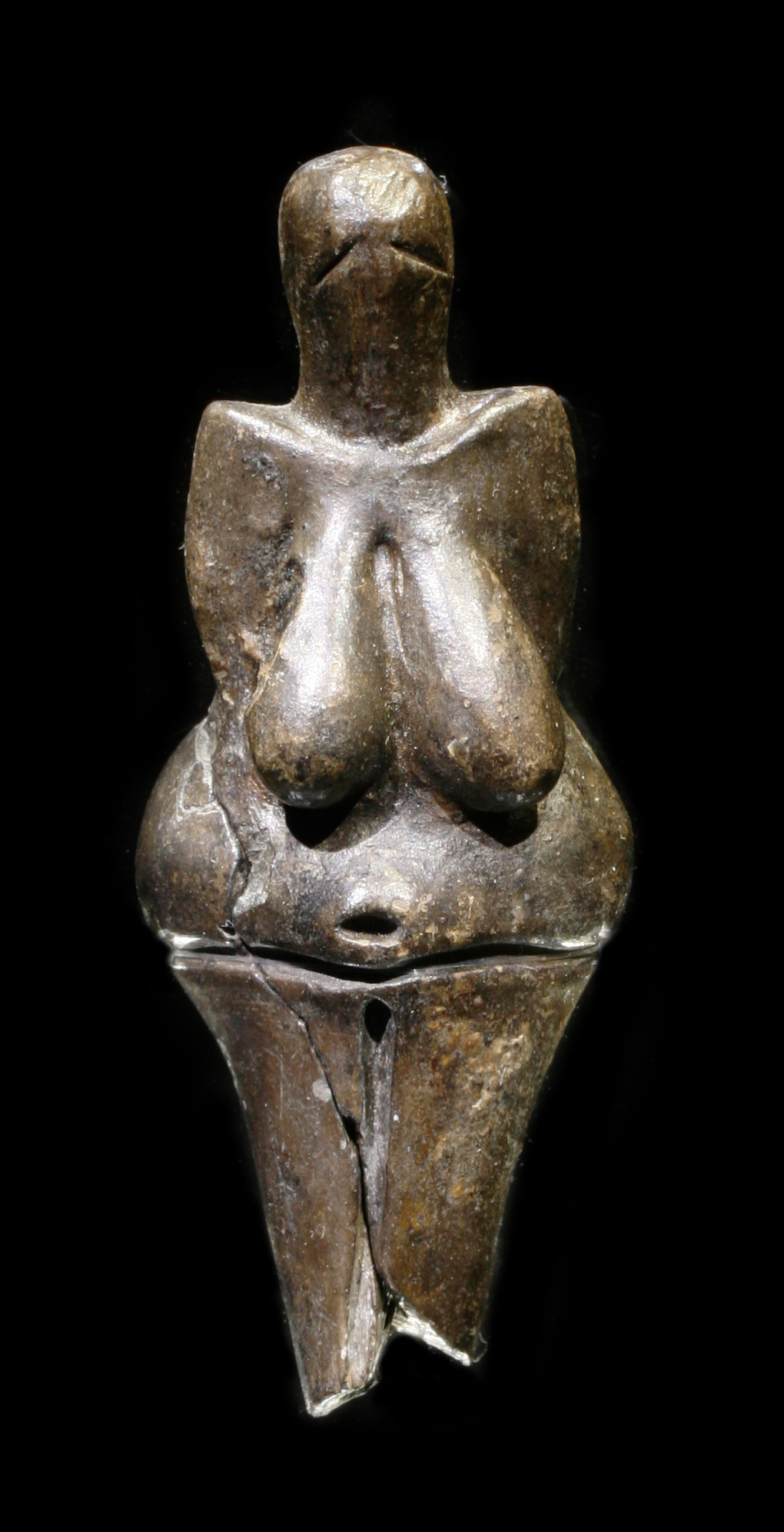
  Venus of Dolní Věstonice, the oldest surviving ceramic figurine in the world (29,000 – 25,000 BC)
- Examples of cave art in Spain are dated from around 40,000 BP, making them the oldest examples of cave art yet discovered in Europe (see: Caves of Nerja). Scientists theorise that the paintings may have been made by Neanderthals, rather than by modern humans.
- Wall painting with horses, rhinoceroses and aurochs is made at Chauvet Cave, Vallon-Pont-d'Arc, Ardéche gorge, France. Discovered in December 1994.
- Evidence for continued Neanderthal presence in the Iberian Peninsula at 37,000 years ago was published in 2017.
- Archaeological studies support human presence in the Chek Lap Kok area (now Hong Kong International Airport) from 35,000 to 39,000 years ago.
- Zar, Yataghyeri, Damjili and Taghlar caves in Azerbaijan.
- First evidence of people inhabiting Japan.

==== 35,000–30,000 BP ====
- Kostenki XVII, a layer of the Kostenki (Kostyonki) site, on the middle Don River, was occupied by the early upper paleolithic Spitsyn culture.
- The Red Lady of Paviland (really a young man) lived around 33,600 years ago.

==== 30,000 BP ====
- First ground stone tools appear in Japan.
- End of the Mousterian Pluvial in North Africa.
- The area of Sydney was occupied by Aboriginal Australians during this time period, as evidenced by radiocarbon dating. In an archaeological dig in Parramatta, Western Sydney, it was found that the Aboriginals used charcoal, stone tools and possible ancient campfires.
- First human settlement in Alice Springs, Northern Territory, Australia.
- Kilu Cave at Buka in the Solomons is evidence for the first human settlement of an oceanic island and for navigating the open ocean.

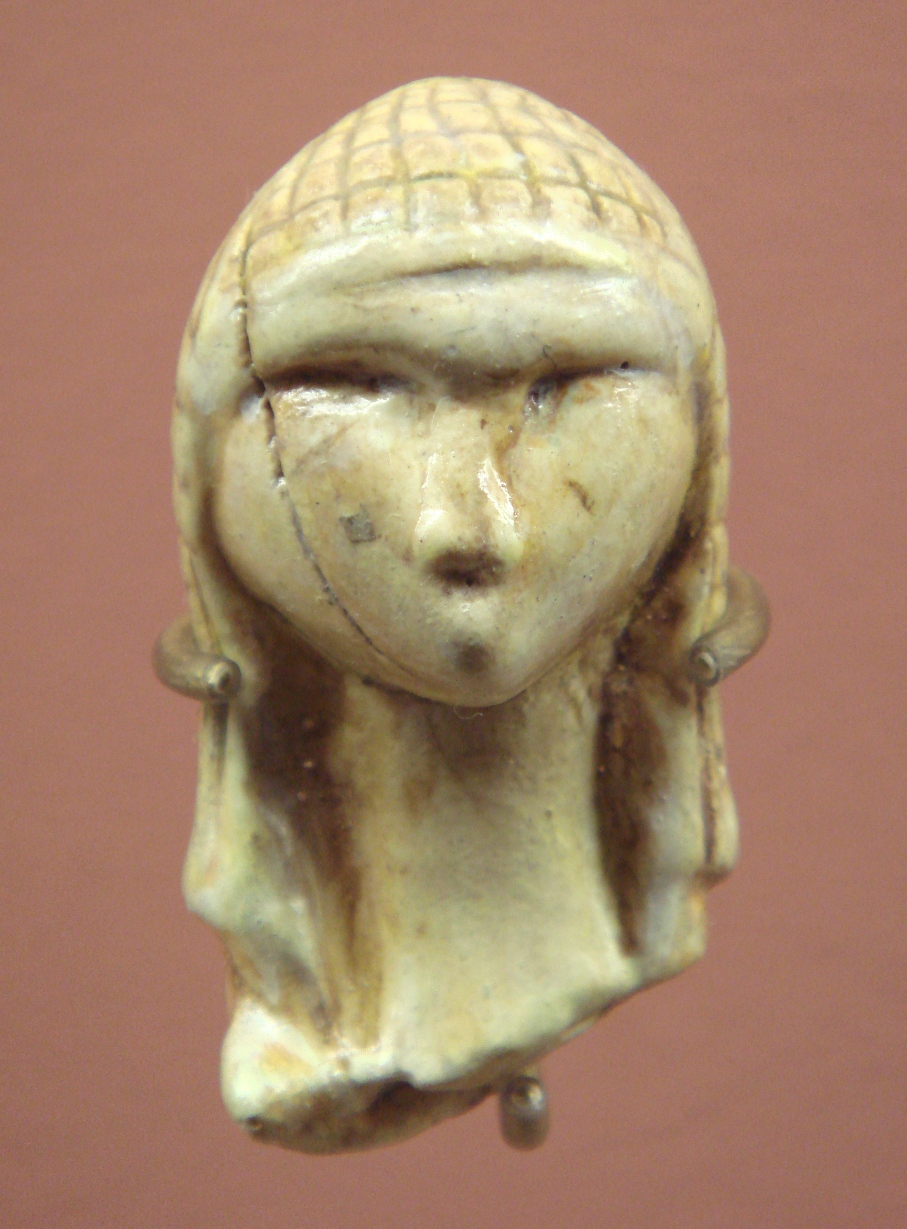
The Venus of Brassempouy is preserved in the Musée d'Archéologie Nationale at Saint-Germain-en-Laye, near Paris.

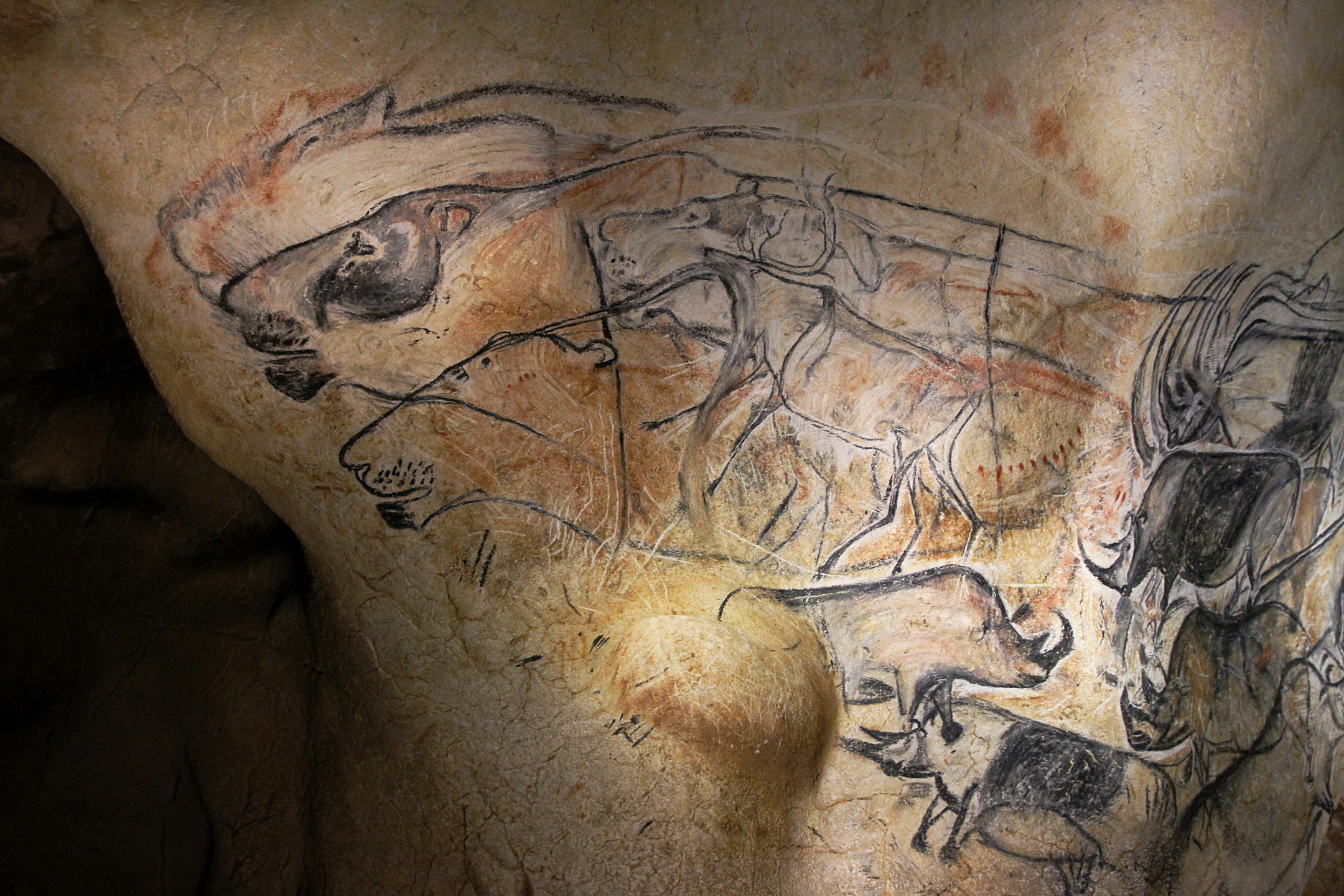
30,000-year-old cave lion and woolly rhinoceros painting found in the Chauvet Cave, France

=== 30,000–20,000 BP ===
==== 29,000–25,000 BP ====
- Eruption of the Ciomad volcano, the last volcanic eruption in the Carpathians.
- Venus of Dolní Věstonice (Czech Republic). It is the oldest known ceramic in the world.
- Venus of Willendorf, Austria, created. It is now at the Natural History Museum, Vienna.
- Human settlement in Beijing, China dates from about 27,000 to 10,000 years ago.
- Paintings of spotted horses, Pech Merle cave, Dordogne, date to c.25,000 years ago

==== 24,000 BP ====
- Start of the second Mousterian Pluvial in North Africa.

==== 23,000 BP ====
- Venus of Petřkovice is created at Petřkovice in Ostrava, Czech Republic. It is now in Archeological Institute, Brno.

==== 22,000 BP ====
- Last Glacial Maximum: Venus of Brassempouy, Grotte du Pape, Brassempouy, Landes, France, created. It is now at Musée des Antiquités Nationales, Saint-Germain-en-Laye.

==== 21,000 BP ====
- Artifacts suggests early human activity occurred at some point in Canberra, Australia. Archaeological evidence of settlement in the region includes inhabited rock shelters, rock art, burial places, camps and quarry sites, and stone tools and arrangements.
- End of the second Mousterian Pluvial in North Africa.

=== 20,000–10,000 BP ===
- Last Glacial Maximum. Mean sea levels are believed to be 110 to 120 metres (360 to 390 ft) lower than present, with the direct implication that many coastal and lower riverine valley archaeological sites of interest are today under water.

==== 18,000 BP ====
- Ibex-headed spear-thrower, from Mas-d'Azil cave, now at the Musée de la Préhistoire in the village of Le Mas-d'Azil.
- Mammoth-bone village in Mezhyrich, Ukraine

==== 17,000 BP ====
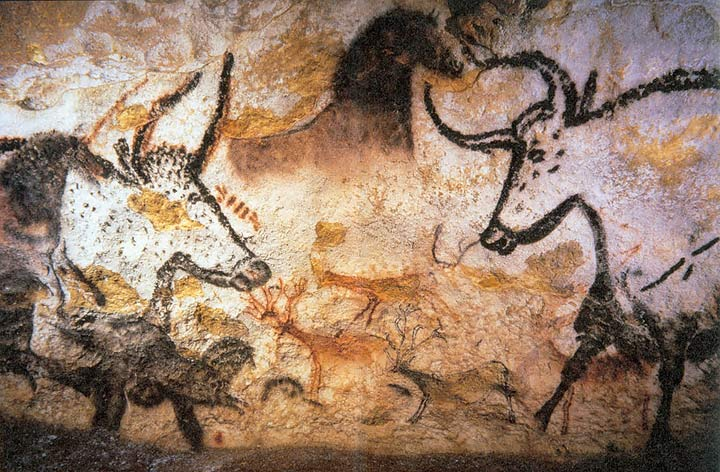
Lascaux cave painting, 15,000 BC, a UNESCO World Heritage Site

- Spotted human hands are painted at Pech Merle cave, Dordogne, France. Discovered in December 1994.
- Oldest Dryas stadial.
- Hall of Bulls at Lascaux in France is painted. Discovered in 1940. Closed to the public in 1963.
- Bird-Headed man with bison and Rhinoceros, Lascaux, is painted.
- Lamp with ibex design, from La Mouthe cave, Dordogne, France, is made. It is now at Musée des Antiquités Nationales, Saint-Germain-en-Laye.
- Paintings in Cosquer Cave are made, where the cave mouth is now under water at Cap Margiou, France.

==== 15,000 BP ====
- Bølling interstadial.
- Bison, Le Tuc d'Audoubert, Ariège, France.
- Paleo-Indians move across North America, then southward through Central America.
- Pregnant woman and deer (?), from Laugerie-Basse, France was made. It is now at Musée des Antiquités Nationales, St.-Germain-en-Laye.

14,000 BP

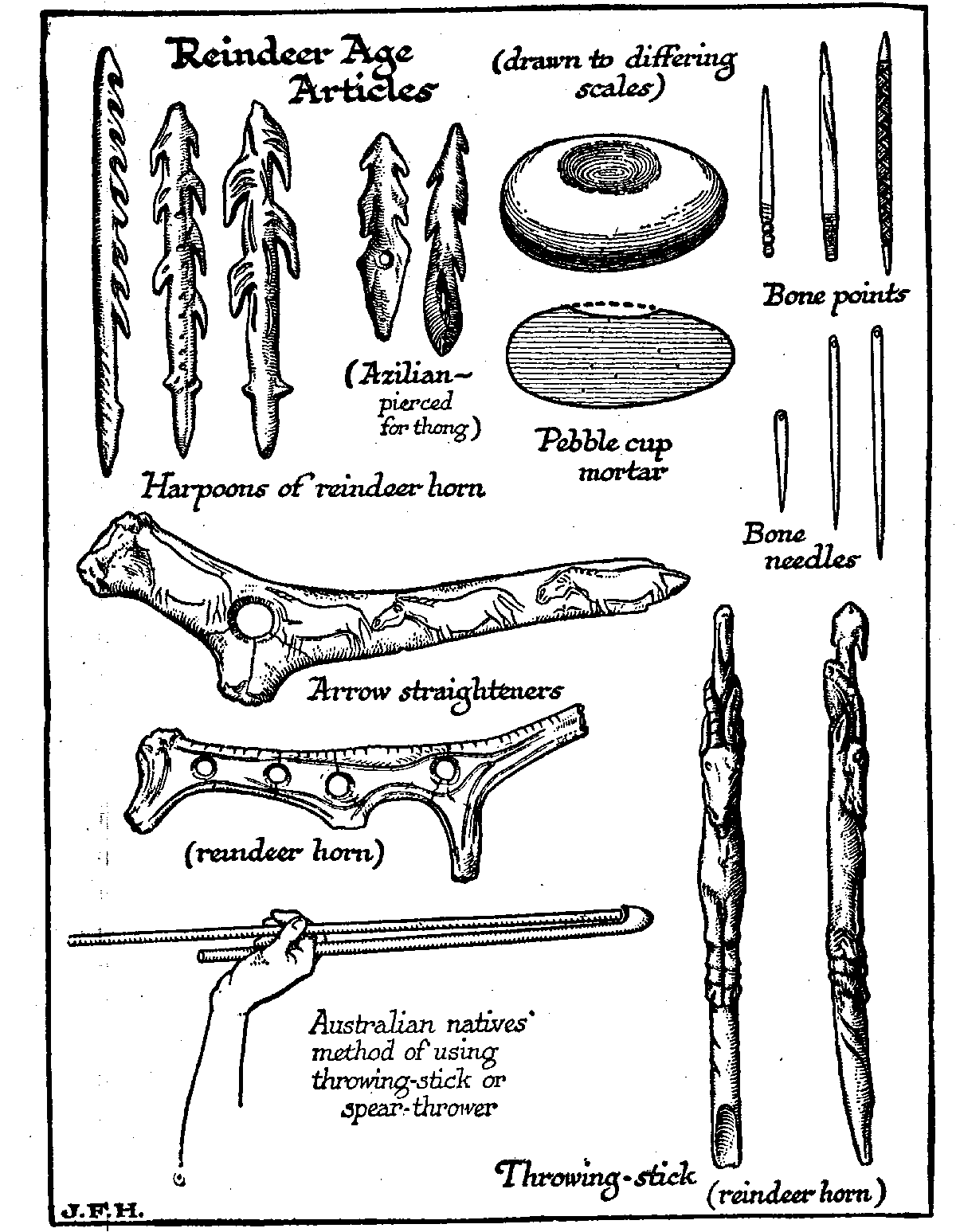
Reindeer Age articles

- Older Dryas stadial, Allerød interstadial.
- Paleo-Indians searched for big game near what is now the Hovenweep National Monument.
- Bison, on the ceiling of a cave at Altamira, Spain, is painted. Discovered in 1879. Accepted as authentic in 1902.
- Younger Dryas stadial.
- Beginning of the Holocene extinction.

==== 12,000 BP ====
- Wooden buildings in South America (Chile).
- First pottery vessels in Japan.

==== 11,000 BP ====
- First evidence of human settlement in Argentina.
- The Arlington Springs Man dies on the island of Santa Rosa, off the coast of California, United States.
- Human remains deposited in caves which are now located off the coast of Yucatán, Mexico.
- Creswellian culture settlement on Hengistbury Head, England, dates from around this year.

==== 10,000 BP ====
- Evidence of a massacre near Lake Turkana, Kenya indicates upper paleolithic warfare.

== Cultures ==
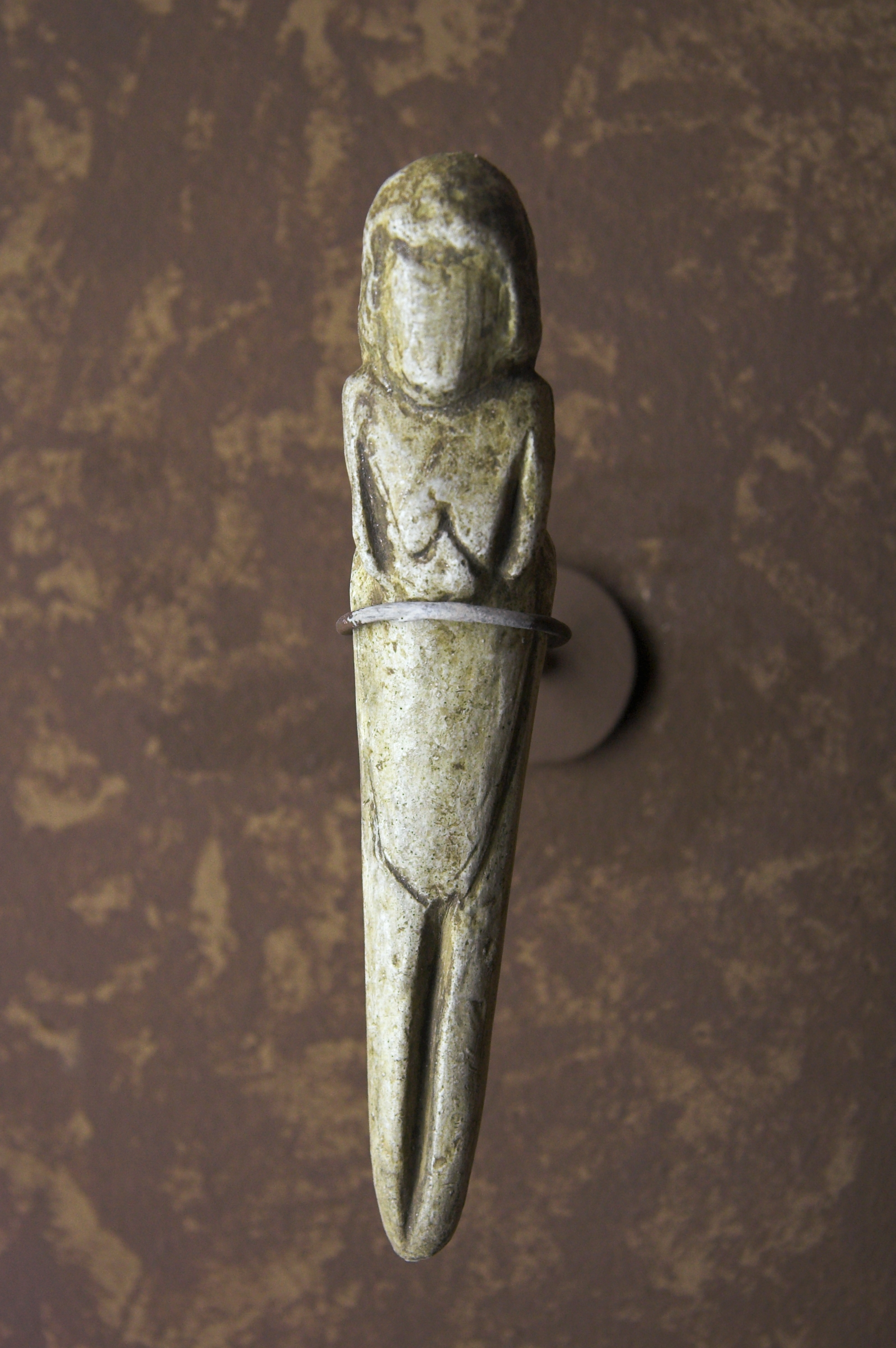
Statuette from the Venus figurines of Mal'ta, from the easternmost Upper Paleolithic culture, the Mal'ta–Buret' culture, Siberia

The Upper Paleolithic in the Franco-Cantabrian region:

- The Châtelperronian culture was located around central and south western France, and northern Spain. It appears to be derived from the Mousterian culture, and represents the period of overlap between Neanderthals and Homo sapiens. This culture lasted from approximately 45,000 BP to 40,000 BP.
- The Aurignacian culture was located in Europe and south west Asia, and flourished between 43,000 and 26,000 BP. It may have been contemporary with the Périgordian (a contested grouping of the earlier Châtelperronian and later Gravettian cultures).
- The Gravettian culture was located across Europe. Gravettian sites generally date between 33,000 and 20,000 BP.
- The Solutrean culture was located in eastern France, Spain, and England. Solutrean artifacts have been dated c. 22,000 to 17,000 BP.
- The Magdalenian culture left evidence from Portugal to Poland during the period from 17,000 to 12,000 BP.
- Central and east Europe:
  - 33,000 BP, Gravettian culture in southern Ukraine
  - 30,000 BP, Szeletian culture
  - 22,000 BP, Pavlovian, Aurignacian cultures
  - 13,000 BP, Ahrensburg culture (Western Germany, Netherlands, England)
  - 12,000 BP, Epigravettian
- North and west Africa, and Sahara:
  - 32,000 BP, Aterian culture (Algeria, Libya)
  - 12,000 BP, Ibero-Maurusian (a.k.a. Oranian, Ouchtatian), and Sebilian cultures
  - 10,000 BP, Capsian culture (Tunisia, Algeria)
- Central, south, and east Africa:
  - 50,000 BP, Fauresmith culture
  - 30,000 BP, Stillbayan culture
  - 12,000 BP, Lupembian culture
  - 11,000 BP, Magosian culture (Zambia, Tanzania)
  - 9,000 BP, Wiltonian culture
- West Asia (including Middle East):
  - 50,000 BP, Jabroudian culture (Levant)
  - 40,000 BP, Amoudian culture
  - 30,000 BP, Emireh culture
  - 20,000 BP, Aurignacian culture
  - 12,000 BP, Kebarian, Athlitian cultures
- South, central and northern Asia:
  - 30,000 BP, Angara culture
  - 11,000 BP, Khandivili culture
- East and southeast Asia:
  - 30,000 BP, Sen-Doki culture
  - 16,000 BP, Jōmon period starts in Ancient Japan
  - 12,000 BP, pre-Jōmon ceramic culture (Japan)
  - 10,000 BP, Hoabinhian culture (Northern Vietnam)
  - 9,000 BP, Jōmon culture (Japan)

== See also ==
- Last Glacial Maximum
- Mesolithic
- Neolithic
- Neolithic Europe
- Behavioral modernity
- Cro-Magnon 1
- Aurignacian
- Epigravettian
- Sungir
- Cultural universal
- Quaternary extinction event
- Early human migrations
- Dean R. Snow – A leading archeologist who has conducted extensive Paleolithic research.
