= African pluvial periods =

Obsolete system of climatic periods

African pluvial periods are an obsolete system of climatic periods previously used by paleontologists working in East Africa.

== Background ==
The sedimentary deposits left by ancient lakes in East Africa had enabled Louis Leakey and post-war paleontologists to define major climatic periods considered wet, interspersed with drier periods. Of progressively decreasing durations, they each bore the name of the site where the first clues had been collected: Kageran (Kagera), Kamasian, Kanjeran (Kanjera) and Gamblian. Paleontologists believed that the quasi-arid zones then became wooded savannahs where animals and prehistoric hunter-gatherers could thrive.

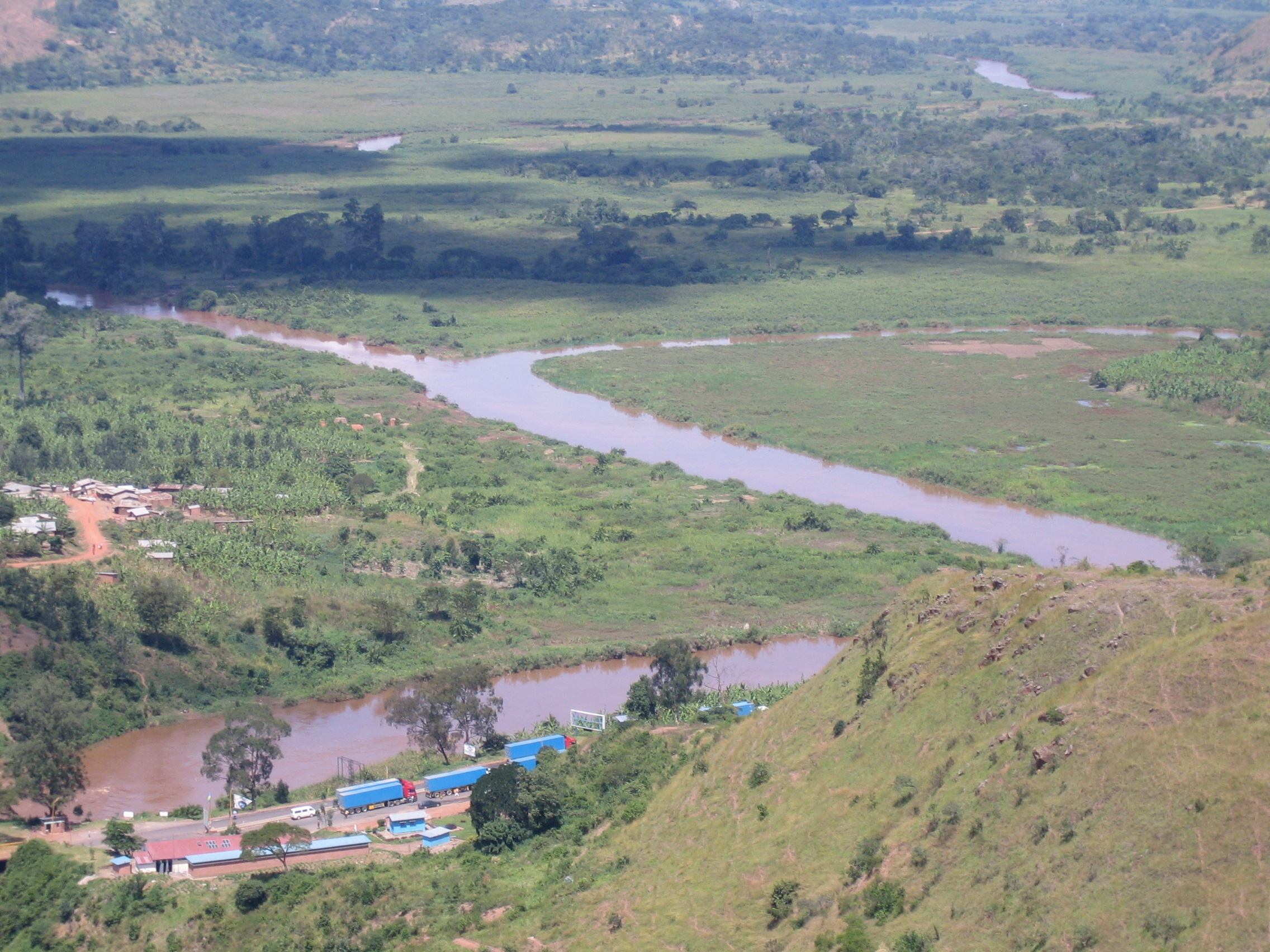
The Kagera River, on the Rwanda-Tanzania border

== Chronology ==
These ancient climatic periods were only very approximately dated:

- Kageran: Calabrian (Early Pleistocene)

The Kageran takes its name from the Kagera River, which flows through Rwanda and northwestern Tanzania before flowing into Lake Victoria.

- Kamasian: Early Middle or Central Pleistocene; the Kamasian was more or less related to the Mindel glaciation

Kamasian is a district of Kenya located in the Great Rift Valley.

- Kanjeran: Late Middle Pleistocene; the Kanjerian was more or less related to the Riss glaciation

Kanjera is a site in Kenya located on the shores of Lake Victoria.

- Gamblian: Late Pleistocene; the Gamblian was more or less related to the Würm glaciation

The term Gamblian was introduced by Louis Leakey in the 1930s.

== New climatic division ==
These ancient climatic periods have been gradually replaced in the scientific literature by the isotopic chronology in force since the end of the 20th century, which defines the alternation of glacial and interglacial periods on a global scale. Interglacial periods are warmer and, therefore, wetter on average than ice ages. The latter, however, themselves experience alternations of more or less heavy rainfall, but at a much faster rate (on a geological scale) than what had originally been imagined for East Africa.

== See also ==
- Interglacial
- Sahara pump theory
- Abbassia Pluvial
- Mousterian Pluvial

== Bibliography ==
- Sonia Cole (1954). "The Prehistory of East Africa". American Anthropologist. 56. Londres: 1026-1050.
- J. Moeyersons (1979). "Environmental Evolution in Central Africa during Prehistoric Times". African Economic History. 7. Tervuren: 22-29.
