= Pluvial =

Climate or climatological period climate characterized by relatively high precipitation

In geology and climatology, a pluvial is either a modern climate characterized by relatively high precipitation or an interval of time of variable length, decades to thousands of years, during which a climate is characterized by relatively high precipitation or humidity. Subdivisions of a pluvial, which are characterized by relatively high precipitation, are known as a subpluvials. Formally, pluvials were equated with glacial stages of the Quaternary. However, pluvials, as in equatorial regions, can also occur during interglacial stages. Some lower latitudes have experienced major pluvials in early to mid-Holocene times.

In geomorphology, a pluvial refers to a geologic episode, change, process, deposit, or feature that is the result of the action or effects of rain. Sometimes, it also refers to the fluvial action of rainwater flowing in a stream channel, including a flood, known as a pluvial flood, that is the direct result of excessive precipitation.

== See also ==
- African pluvial periods
- Abbassia Pluvial
- Carnian Pluvial Event
- Mousterian Pluvial
- Neolithic Subpluvial
- Pluvial lake
