= North African climate cycles =

Cyclic climate pattern

North African climate cycles have a unique history that can be traced back millions of years. The cyclic climate pattern of the Sahara is characterized by significant shifts in the strength of the North African Monsoon. When the North African Monsoon is at its strongest, annual precipitation and consequently vegetation in the Sahara region increase, resulting in conditions commonly referred to as the "green Sahara". For a relatively weak North African Monsoon, the opposite is true, with decreased annual precipitation and less vegetation resulting in a phase of the Sahara climate cycle known as the "desert Sahara".

Variations in the climate of the Sahara region can, at the simplest level, be attributed to the changes in insolation because of slow shifts in Earth's orbital parameters. The parameters include the precession of the equinoxes, obliquity, and eccentricity as put forth by the Milankovitch theory. The precession of the equinoxes is regarded as the most important orbital parameter in the formation of the "green Sahara" and "desert Sahara" cycle.

A January 2019 MIT paper in Science Advances shows a cycle from wet to dry approximately every 20,000 years.

== Orbital Monsoon Hypothesis ==
=== Development ===
The idea that changes in insolation caused by shifts in the Earth's orbital parameters are a controlling factor for the long-term variations in the strength of monsoon patterns across the globe was first suggested by Rudolf Spitaler in the late nineteenth century, The hypothesis was later formally proposed and tested by the meteorologist John Kutzbach in 1981. Kutzbach's ideas about the impacts of insolation on global monsoonal patterns have become widely accepted today as the underlying driver of long term monsoonal cycles. Kutzbach never formally named his hypothesis and as such it is referred to here as the "Orbital Monsoon Hypothesis" as suggested by Ruddiman in 2001.

=== Insolation ===
Insolation, which is simply a measure of the amount of solar radiation received on a given surface area in a given time period, is the fundamental factor behind the Orbital Monsoon Hypothesis. Due to variations in heat capacity, continents heat up faster than surrounding oceans during summer months when insolation is at its strongest and cool off faster than the surrounding oceans during winter months when insolation is at its weakest. The wind pattern that results from the continent/ocean insolation temperature gradient is known as a monsoon. Values of summer insolation are more important for a region's climate than winter values. This is because the winter phase of a monsoon is always dry. Thus the flora and fauna of a monsoonal climate are determined by the amount of rain that falls during the summer phase of the monsoon. Over periods of tens to hundreds of thousands of years the amount of insolation changes in a highly complex cycle that is based on orbital parameters. The result of this cycle of insolation is a waxing and waning in the strength of the monsoonal climates across the globe. A wide range of geologic evidence has shown that the North African Monsoon is particularly susceptible to insolation cycles, and long term trends in monsoonal strength can be linked to slow variations in insolation. However, the abrupt shifts back and forth from the "green Sahara" to the "desert Sahara" are not entirely explained by long term changes in the insolation cycle.

=== Precession ===
Precession of the equinoxes on Earth can be divided up into two distinct phases. The first phase is created by a wobbling of the Earth's axis of rotation and is known as axial precession. While the second phase is known as apsidal precession or procession of the ellipse and is related to the slow rotation of the Earth's elliptical orbit around the Sun. When combined these two phases create a precession of the equinoxes that has a strong 23,000-year cycle and a weak 19,000-year cycle.

Variations in the strength of the North African Monsoon have been found to be strongly related to the stronger 23,000-year processional cycle. The relationship between the precession cycle and the strength of the North African Monsoon exists because procession affects the amount of insolation received in a given hemisphere. The amount of insolation is maximized for the northern hemisphere when the precession cycle is aligned such that the northern hemisphere points toward the sun at perihelion. According to the Orbital Monsoon Hypothesis this maximum in insolation increases the strength of monsoon circulations in the northern hemisphere. On the opposite end of the spectrum, when the Northern Hemisphere is pointed toward the sun during aphelion, there is a minimum in insolation and the North African Monsoon is at its weakest.

=== Obliquity ===
Obliquity, otherwise known as (axial) tilt, refers to the angle that Earth's axis of rotation makes with a line that is perpendicular to Earth's orbital plane. The current tilt of Earth's axis is roughly 23.5°. However, over long periods of time the tilt of Earth's axis of rotation changes because of the uneven distribution of mass across the planet and gravitational interactions with the Sun, Moon, and planets. Due to these interactions the tilt of Earth's axis of rotation varies between 22.2° and 24.5° on a 41,000-year cycle.

Modulation of the precession-driven insolation cycle is the primary impact of obliquity on the North African Monsoon. Evidence for the impact of obliquity on the intensity of the North African Monsoon has been found in records of dust deposits from ocean cores in the Eastern Mediterranean that occur as a result of Aeolian processes. This evidence requires complex feedback mechanisms to explain since the strongest impact of obliquity on insolation is found in the high latitudes. Two possible mechanisms for the existence of an obliquity tracer found in the Eastern Mediterranean Aeolian dust deposits have been proposed. The first of which suggests that at times of higher obliquity the temperature gradient between the poles and the equator in the southern hemisphere is greater during boreal summer (summer in the northern hemisphere). As a result of this gradient the strength of the North African Monsoon increases. A second theory that may explain the existence of an obliquity signature in the North African climate record suggests that obliquity maybe related to changes in the latitude of the tropics. The latitudinal extent of the tropics is roughly defined by the maximum wandering path of the thermal equator. An area that today is located between the Tropic of Capricorn and the Tropic of Cancer. However, as the obliquity changes, the overall wandering path of the thermal equator shifts between 22.2° and 24.5° north and south. This wandering may affect the positioning of the North African Summer Monsoon Front and thus impact the perceived strength of the North African Monsoon. Further confirmation of the impacts of obliquity on the North African Monsoonal have been provided through a global fully coupled atmosphere–ocean–sea ice climate model, which confirmed that precession and obliquity can combine to increase precipitation in North Africa through insolation feedbacks.

=== Eccentricity ===
Orbital eccentricity is a measure of the deviation of the Earth's orbit from a perfect circle. If the Earth's orbit was a perfect circle then the eccentricity would have a value of 0, and eccentricity value of 1 would indicate a parabola. The Earth has two cycles of eccentricity that occur on cycles of 100,000 and 400,000 years. Over the years the Earth's eccentricity has varied between 0.005 and 0.0607, today the eccentricity of Earth's orbit is approximately 0.0167. While the value of eccentricity does impact the distance of the Earth from the Sun, its primary impact on insolation comes from its modulating effect on the procession cycle. For example, when the orbit of the Earth is highly elliptical one hemisphere will have hot summers and cold winters, corresponding to a larger than average yearly insolation gradient. At the same time the other hemisphere will have warm summers and cool winters due to a smaller than average yearly insolation gradient.

Like obliquity, eccentricity is not considered to be a primary driver of the strength of the North African Monsoon. Instead eccentricity modulates the amplitude of the insolation maxima and minima that occur due to the precession cycle. Strong support for the modulation of the precession cycle by eccentricity can be found in Aeolian dust deposits in the Eastern Mediterranean. Upon close examination it can be shown that periods of low and high hematite fluxes correspond to both the 100,000-year and 400,000-year eccentricity cycles. It is believed that this evidence for the eccentricity cycles in the dust record of the Eastern Mediterranean indicates a stronger northward progression of the North African Monsoonal Front during times when the eccentricity and precession insolation maxima coincide. The modulating effect of eccentricity on the precession cycle has also been shown using a global fully coupled atmosphere–ocean–sea ice climate model.

=== Lag ===
One key issue with the Orbital Monsoon Hypothesis is that a detailed inspection of climate record indicates that there is a 1000 to 2000 year lag in the observed North African Monsoon maximum compared to the predicted maximum. This issue occurs because the Orbital Monsoon Hypothesis assumes that there is an instantaneous response by the climate system to changes in insolation from orbital forcing. However, there are a number of fixes for this problem. The most reasonable fix can be shown through a simple analog to today's climate. Currently the peak in solar radiation occurs on June 21, but the peak of the summer monsoon in North Africa occurs a month later in July. A one-month lag such as this should be represented by roughly a 1500 to 2000 year lag in the monsoonal circulation maximum, because a July insolation maximum in a 19,000 to 23,000-year precession cycle occurs roughly 1500 to 2000 years after the June insolation maximum. Two other possible explanations for the observed lag in the data have been put forward. The first suggest that the development of the monsoons in the subtropics is tempered by the slow melting of polar ice sheets. Thus the full strength of the monsoonal pattern is not observed until the polar ice sheets have become so small that their impact on the development of yearly monsoons is minimal. The second alternative solution proposes that relatively cool tropical oceans left over from glaciation may initially slow the development of monsoons globally, since colder oceans are less potent sources of moisture.

== Supporting evidence ==
=== Sapropels ===
Sapropels are dark organic rich marine sediments that contain greater than 2% organic carbon by weight. In the Eastern Mediterranean layers of sapropels can be found in marine sediment cores that align with periods of maximum insolation in the precession cycle over Northern Africa. Such an alignment can be explained by a link to the North African Monsoon. During periods of high insolation the increased strength and northward progression of the North African Monsoonal Front causes very heavy rain along the upper and middle reaches of the Nile River basin. These rains then flow northward and are discharged into the Eastern Mediterranean, where the large influx of nutrient rich fresh water causes a steep vertical salinity gradient. As a result, thermohaline convection is shut off and the water column becomes stably stratified. Once this stable stratification occurs, bottom waters in the Eastern Mediterranean quickly become depleted in oxygen and the large influx of pelagic organic matter from the nutrient rich surface waters is preserved as sapropel formations. One of the key pieces of evidence linking the formation of sapropels to enhance discharge from the Nile River is the fact that they have occurred during both interglacial and glacial periods. Therefore, the formation of sapropels must be linked to fresh water discharge from the Nile River and not melt water from dissipating ice sheets.

=== Paleolakes ===
Evidence for the existence of large lakes in the Sahara can be found and interpreted from the geologic record. These lakes fill as the precession cycle approaches the insolation maximum and are then depleted as the precession cycle nears the insolation minimum. The largest of these paleolakes was Lake Megachad, which at its peak was 173 m deep and covered an area of roughly 400,000 km^{2}. Today the remnants of this once massive lake are known as Lake Chad, which has a maximum depth of 11 m and an area of only 1,350 km^{2}. Satellite imagery of the shorelines of ancient Lake Megachad reveal that the lake has existed under two distinctive wind regimes, one northeasterly and southwesterly. The northeasterly wind regime is consistent with today's wind patterns and is characteristic of weak monsoonal flow. Meanwhile, the southwesterly wind regime is characteristic of a stronger monsoonal flow.

=== Freshwater diatoms ===
Another key piece of evidence for a processional control on the North African Monsoon can be found in the deposits of freshwater diatoms in the tropical Atlantic. Ocean cores from the tropical Atlantic have been found to have distinct layers of the freshwater diatom Aulacoseira granulata, also known as Melosira granulata. These layers occur on a 23,000-year cycle that lags the maximum in precession insolation by roughly 5000 to 6000 years. To explain these cyclic freshwater diatom deposits we have to look inland at the Sahara region of Africa. Around the time of the insolation maximum in the precession cycle the North African Monsoon is at its strongest and the Sahara region becomes dominated by large monsoonal lakes. Then as time progress toward the insolation minima, these lakes begin to dry out due to weakening North African Monsoon. As the lakes dry up thin sediment deposits containing freshwater diatoms are exposed. Finally, when the prevailing northeasterly winds arrive during winter, the freshwater diatom deposits in the dried lake beds are picked up as dust and carried thousands of kilometers out into the tropical Atlantic. From this series of events the reason for 5000 to 6000-year delay in the freshwater diatom deposits is evident, since the North African Monsoon must become sufficiently weak before the monsoonal lakes in the Sahara begin to dry up and expose potential freshwater diatom sources. One key factor that must be noted with freshwater diatom deposits is species identification. For instance some ocean cores directly off the western coast of Africa show a mix of freshwater lake and river diatom species. So for a core to accurately represent the diatom cycle of the Sahara it must be recovered from a region of the tropical Atlantic that has sufficient distance from the coast such that the impacts of river outflows are minimized.

=== Eastern equatorial Atlantic upwelling ===
Observed variations in the strength of the eastern equatorial Atlantic upwelling zone can also be used to support a cycle of the North African Monsoon that is regulated by the precession cycle. When insolation in North Africa is at its peak during the precession cycle the easterly trade winds over the equatorial Atlantic are strongly diverted toward the Sahara. This diversion weakens the equatorial upwelling zone in the eastern equatorial Atlantic, resulting in warmer waters in the pelagic. On the other end of the spectrum when insolation in North Africa is at a minimum due to the precession cycle, the diversion of the easterly trade winds is relatively weak. Due to this the region of upwelling in the eastern equatorial Atlantic remains strong and the waters in the pelagic zone are cooler. The proof that this pattern of periodic weakening of the eastern equatorial Atlantic upwelling exists is found in deposits of surface dwelling planktic organisms in ocean sediment cores. Such cores show that the relative abundance of warm and cold water planktic species vary with a consistent beat of 23,000 years, matching the 23,000-year precession insolation cycle.

== African Humid Period ==
=== Climatology ===
The African Humid Period occurred between 14,800 and 5,500 years ago, and was the last occurrence of a "green Sahara". Conditions in the Sahara during the African Humid Period were dominated by a strong North African Monsoon, resulting in larger annual rainfall totals compared to today's conditions. With the increased rainfall, the vegetation patterns in North Africa were nothing like what we see today. The majority of the Sahara region for instance was characterized by expansive grasslands, also known as steppe. Meanwhile, the Sahel region south of the Sahara was mostly savanna. Today the Sahara region is mostly desert and the Sahel is characterized by savannah grasslands conditions. The African Humid Period was also characterized by a network of vast waterways in the Sahara, consisting of large lakes, rivers, and deltas. The four largest lakes were Lake Megachad, Lake Megafezzan, Ahnet-Mouydir Megalake, and Chotts Megalake. Large rivers in the region included the Senegal River, Nile River, Sahabi River, and Kufra River. These river and lake systems provided corridors that allowed many animal species, including humans, to expand their range across the Sahara.

=== Onset and termination ===
Geologic evidence from the beginning and end of the African Humid Period suggests that both the onset and termination of the African Humid Period were abrupt. In fact both events likely occurred on a timescale of decades to centuries. The onset and termination of the African Humid Period both occurred when the insolation cycle reached a value of roughly 4.2% higher than today. However, shifts in the insolation cycle are too gradual to cause abrupt climate transitions like those seen at the onset and termination of the African Humid Period all on their own. So to account for these rapid shifts in the climate of the Sahara, several nonlinear feedback mechanisms have been proposed. One of the most common sets of nonlinear feedback mechanisms considered, are vegetation-atmosphere interactions. Computer models looking at vegetation-atmosphere interactions and insolation across North Africa have shown the ability to simulate the rapid transitions between "green Sahara" and "desert Sahara" regimes. Thus the results from these models suggest the possible existence of a vegetation-insolation threshold, which if reached, allows the Sahara region to rapidly transition from "green Sahara" to "desert Sahara" and vice versa.

== See also ==
- Abbassia Pluvial
- Mousterian Pluvial
- Sahara pump theory
- Climate change in the Middle East and North Africa
