= Levantine corridor =

Geographic corridor that connects Africa to Eurasia

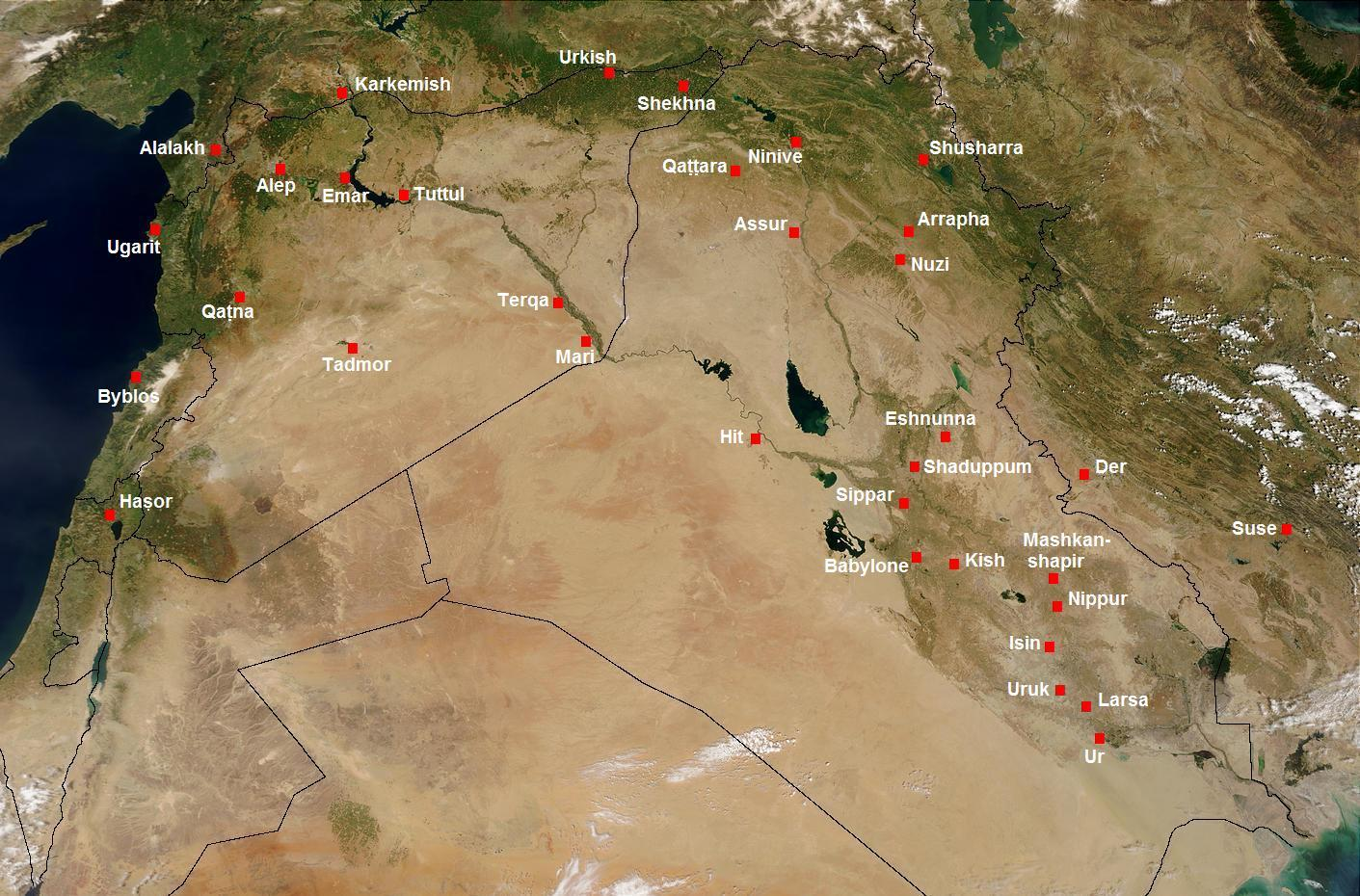
Fertile Crescent; the Levantine corridor is by the sea

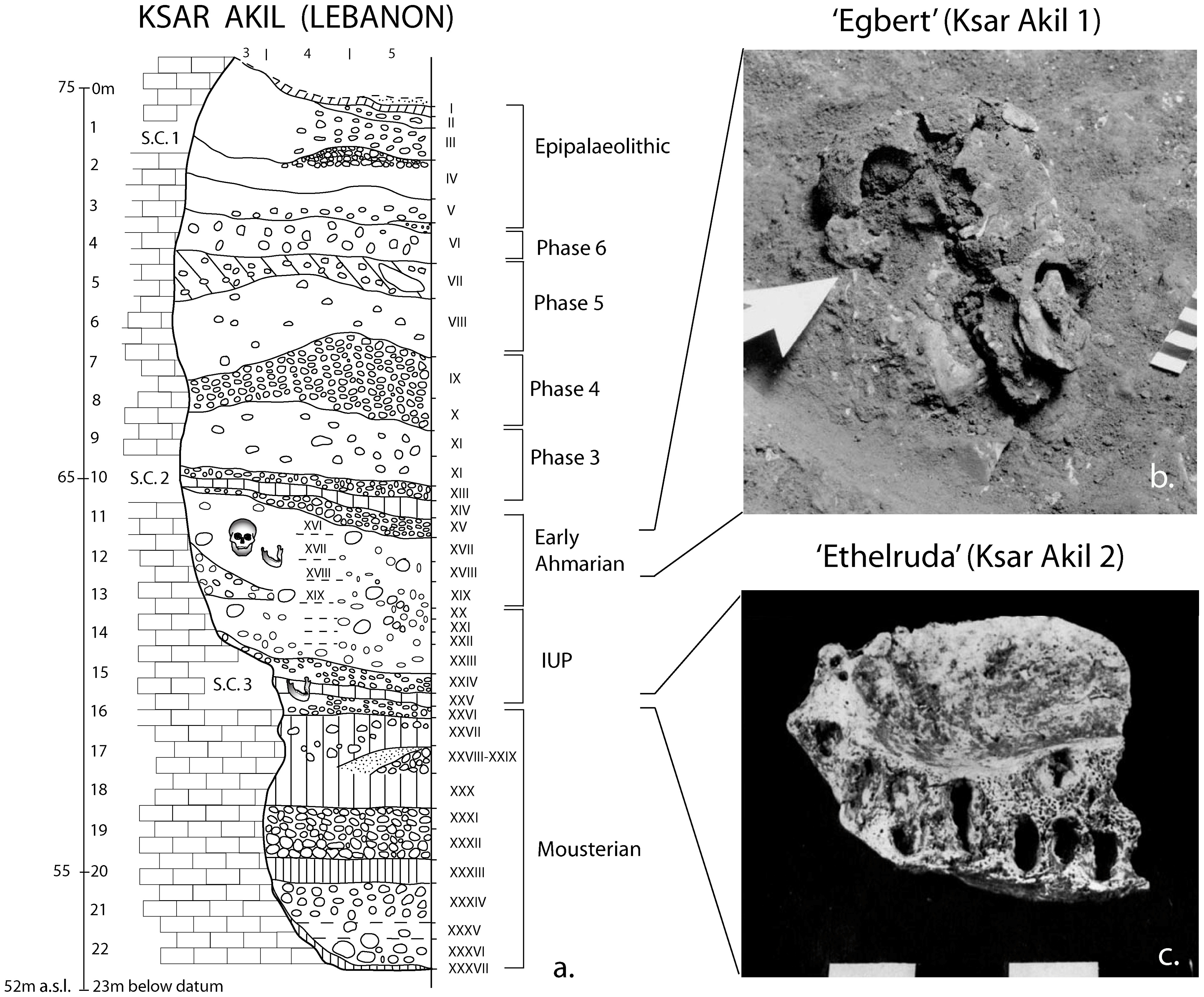
Layer sequence at Ksar Akil in the Levantine corridor, and discovery of two fossils of Homo sapiens, dated to 40,800 to 39,200 years BP for "Egbert",and 42,400–41,700 BP for "Ethelruda"..

The Levantine corridor is the relatively narrow strip in Western Asia, between the Mediterranean Sea to the northwest and deserts to the southeast, which connects Africa to Eurasia. It is the western part of the Fertile Crescent, the eastern part of the latter being Mesopotamia. This corridor is a land route of migrations of animals between Eurasia and Africa. In particular, it is believed that early hominins spread from Africa to Eurasia via the Levantine corridor and Horn of Africa. The corridor is named after the Levant.

== Dispersal route for plants ==
Botanists recognize this area as a dispersal route of plant species.

== Migration route for humans ==
The distribution of Y-chromosome and mtDNA haplogroups suggests that during the Paleolithic and Mesolithic periods, the Levantine corridor was more important for bi-directional human migrations between Africa and Eurasia than was the Horn of Africa.

The term is used frequently by archaeologists as an area that includes Cyprus, where important developments occurred during the Neolithic Revolution.

The first sedentary villages were established around fresh water springs and lakes in the Levantine corridor by the Natufian culture.

== See also ==
- Sahara pump theory
