= Cleaver (Stone Age tool) =

Biface stone tool

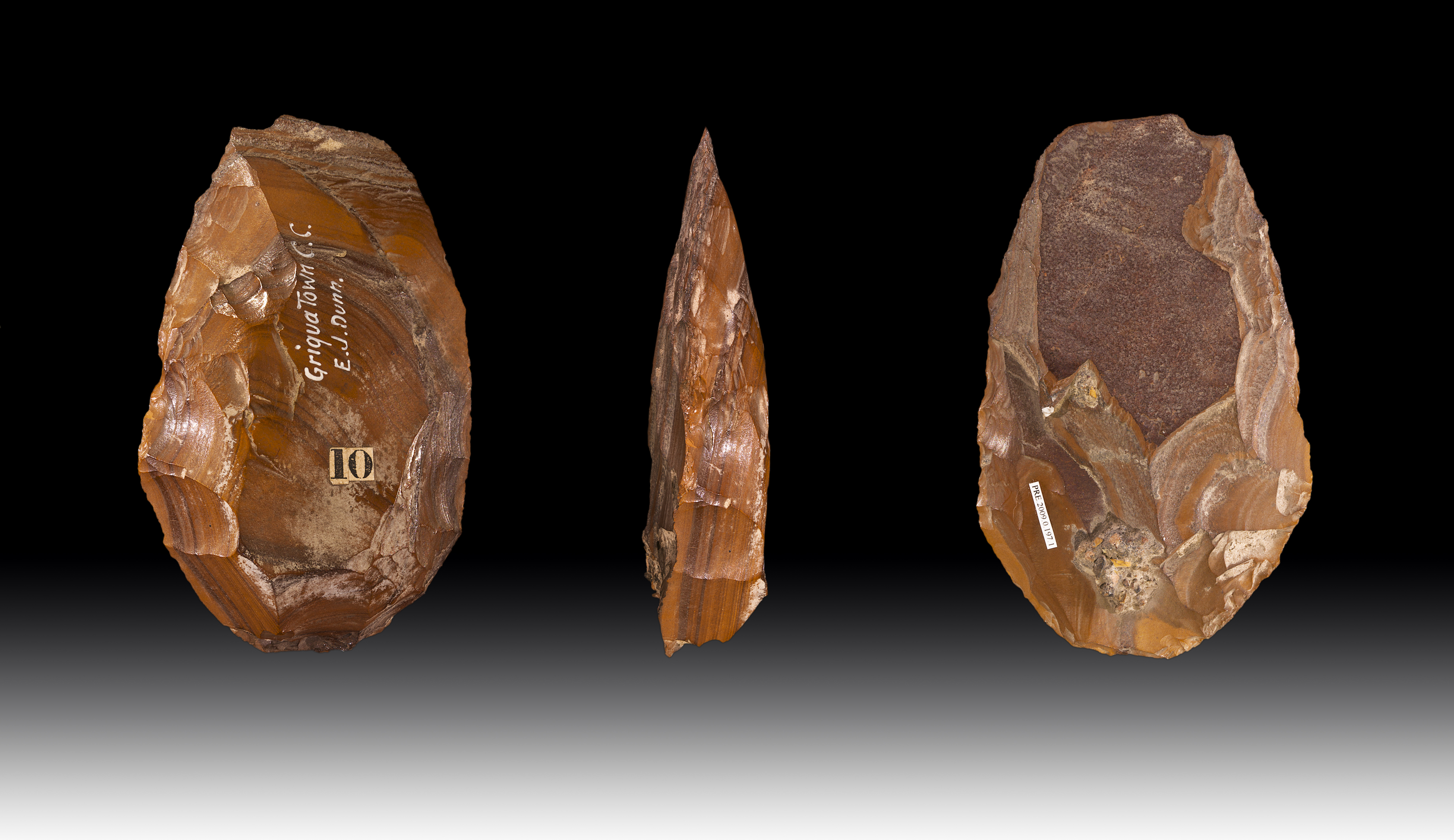
Three views of a flint cleaver from Griquatown, Northern Cape Province, South Africa

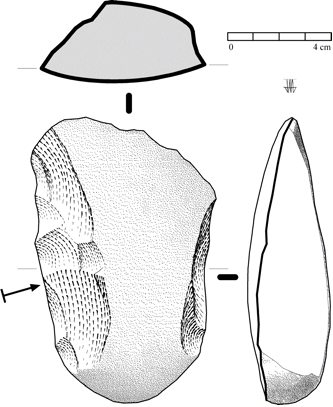
Three-view diagram

In archaeology, a cleaver is a type of biface stone tool of the Lower Palaeolithic.

Cleavers resemble hand axes in that they are large and oblong or U-shaped tools meant to be held in the hand. But, unlike hand axes, they have a wide, straight cutting edge running at right angles to the axis of the tool.

Acheulean cleavers resemble handaxes but with the pointed end truncated away. Flake cleavers have a cutting edge created by a tranchet flake being struck from the primary surface.

== Differences between cleavers and hand axes ==
Cleavers, found in many Acheulean assemblages such as Africa, were similar in size and manner of hand axes. The differences between a hand axe and a cleaver is that a hand axe has a more pointed tip, while a cleaver will have a more transverse "bit" that consists of an untrimmed portion of the edge oriented perpendicular to the long axis of the tool. These were used in lithic technology. It is unclear if it was used for heavy digging or not. More experiments were shown that the cleaver in Africa was more used as a butchering instrument. They were also helpful in skinning large game, and breaking bones.

== Cleavers in Africa ==
In Africa, cleavers first appeared from the late Oldowan to the Acheulean. In Peninj on the western shore of Lake Notron, cleavers constitute 16% of all findings.

One type of cleaver made in Africa was formed by the Tavelbala Tachengit technique. This procedure was used in the north-west Sahara desert. It was done by detachment of large flakes for biface manufacture. This was a significant technological advance because the cleavers normally produced were made on large flakes, which was impossible to produce with using the nodular flint of the size used on the European continent. Once the large flakes were detached, there were only minor modifications needed to get the desired end product that is now known as the flake-cleaver. There are collections of these flakes in the Institute of Human Paleontology in Paris. They include larger hand axes and smaller hand axes ranging from 6–26 cm, and large flake cleavers that were commonly found in this area.

Another way to make the tools was known as the "Victoria West" technique, termed by Goodwin in 1934. This process was used in the Middle Pleistocene of South Africa, and was the chosen method of producing large flakes that was used to create cleavers. This production date was between 285 k.A BP to 510 k.a. BP.

== Cleavers in Europe ==
Outside Africa where cleavers were most abundant, cleavers have appeared in Southwestern Europe. In these regions, they are more abundant than hand axes where raw material occurs in the form of large quartzite cobbles that do not need extensive decortication and shaping prior to the removal of large flakes. Cleavers can also be found made from different raw materials such as flint or limestone, but these are not nearly so common.

There is also a chronological gap between the two lithic assemblages of the early core and flake techniques to the later Acheulian. Central France shows that both of these existed. One of the cleavers found in Central France was a 20 cm long cleaver. This particular one was found in the Mazieres/ Cresuse Valley, and looks slightly different from the cleavers which were found in Africa based solely on the technique used at this time period.

== Cleavers in Asia ==
This tool type is known from various Lower Paleolithic sites across western Asia and Indian subcontinent. There are a few examples found in China too.
