= Abbassia Pluvial =

Extended wet and rainy period in the climate history of North Africa

The Abbassia Pluvial was an extended wet and rainy period in the climate history of North Africa, lasting from c. 120,000 to 90,000 years ago. As such it spans the transitional period connecting the Lower and Middle Paleolithic.

As with the subsequent Mousterian Pluvial (c. 50,000 to 30,000 years ago), the Abbassia Pluvial brought wet and fertile conditions to what is now the Sahara Desert, which bloomed with lush vegetation fed by lakes, swamps, and river systems, many of which later disappeared in the drier climate that followed the pluvial.

African wildlife that is now associated with the grasslands and woodlands south of the Sahara penetrated the entire North African region during the Abbassia Pluvial.

Stone Age cultures (notably the Mousterian and the Aterian industries) flourished in North Africa during the Abbassia Pluvial.

The shift to harsher climate conditions that came with the end of the pluvial may have promoted the emigration of modern Homo sapiens out of Africa to the rest of the globe.

== See also ==
- Neolithic subpluvial
- North African climate cycles

== Sources ==
- Burroughs, William J., ed. Climate: Into the 21st Century. Cambridge, Cambridge University Press, 2003.
- Wells, Spencer (2004). The Journey of Man : A Genetic Odyssey. New York, NY: Random House Trade Paperbacks. ISBN 978-0-8129-7146-0.
- Wilson, R. C. L., S. A. Drury, and J. L. Chapman. The Great Ice Age: Climate Change and Life. London, Routledge, 2000.
