= Mousterian Pluvial =

Obsolete term for a prehistoric wet and rainy period in North Africa

The Mousterian Pluvial is a mostly obsolete term for a prehistoric wet and rainy (pluvial) period in North Africa. It was described as beginning around 50,000 years before the present (BP), lasting roughly 20,000 years, and ending ca. 30,000 BP.

== Terminology and definition ==
In Africa, the Mousterian industry was an archaeological term for a category of Middle Stone Age (or Middle Paleolithic) stone tool production. During the time that archaeological dates were determined by radiocarbon decay, the production of such tools was once thought to have occurred just before the limit of radiocarbon dating at 40,000 to 35,000 BP. In Europe, Mousterian tools were made by archaic Neanderthals. In Africa, such tools were made by early anatomically-modern Homo sapiens. Similar people also made similar tools which are categorized as Alterian. To avoid confusion about their makers, the Mousterian and Alterian tools are now sometimes grouped as Aterian. With more recent dating methods, the tools are now understood to have been mostly produced during the humid Eemian interglacial and later phases of MIS 5, from 130,000 to 72,000 BP. Mousterian tools are frequently older than the Aterian tools.

== Further research and obsolescence ==
During the dry period that followed in Northern Africa, from 71,000 to 14,500 BP, recent research has found that there were 3 semi-humid interruptions: 65,000 to 61,000 BP, 52,500 to 50,500 BP, and 37,500 to 33,000 BP. The last two have sometimes been grouped to constitute a “Mousterian Pluvial.” They are not associated with strong “Green Sahara” events, like the ones of the Eemian in early MIS 5; the late MIS 5 humid period (105,000 to 75 BP); or the early Holocene. Few if any Mousterian or Aterian toolmakers survived in North Africa to witness them.

Some older descriptions of the Mousterian Pluvial described it as a strong African Humid period. During earlier strong African Humid periods, the now-desiccated regions of northern Africa were well-watered, bearing lakes, swamps, and river systems that no longer exist. What is now the Sahara Desert supported typical African wildlife of grassland and woodland environments: herbivores from gazelle to giraffe to ostrich, predators from lion to jackal, even hippopotamus and crocodile, as well as extinct forms like the Pleistocene camel. The humid periods of 52,500 to 50,000 BP and 37,5000 to 33,000 were not as strong as those of the earlier Eemian humid period.

The old theory was that the Mousterian Pluvial was caused by large-scale climatic changes during the last ice age. By 50,000 BP, the Wisconsin glaciation ("Würm glaciation" in Europe) was well-advanced. Growing ice sheets in North America and Europe displaced the standard climatic zones of the northern hemisphere southward. The temperate zones of Europe and North America acquired an Arctic or tundra climate, and the rain bands typical of the temperate zones dropped to the latitudes of northern Africa. The same influences that created the Mousterian Pluvial were thought to have brought it to a close. In the period of its fullest development from 30,000 to 18,000 BP, the Laurentide Ice Sheet not only covered an enormous geographic area but also increased its altitude to 1750 m (1.1 mi). It generated its own long-term weather patterns, which affected the jet stream passing over North America. The jet stream effectively split into two, which created a new dominant weather pattern over the northern hemisphere that brought harsher conditions to several regions (including parts of Central Asia and the Middle East). The changes included an end to the Mousterian Pluvial and a return to a more arid climate in Northern Africa.

It is now understood that the major African humid period events were caused by increased insolation in the northern hemisphere and the impact of continental surface warming on the tropical monsoons.

== See also ==
- North African climate cycles
