= Timeline of prehistory =

This timeline of prehistory outlines selected developments in human prehistory from approximately 320,000 years ago to around 3200 BC. It begins near the age of some of the earliest known fossils attributed to Homo sapiens, discovered at Jebel Irhoud in present-day Morocco, and covers developments in human migration, technology, subsistence, art and settlement through the Paleolithic and early Holocene. For earlier stages of human evolution, see the Timeline of human evolution.

Prehistory generally refers to the period before written records, but its endpoint varies between regions. Writing emerged in Mesopotamia by approximately 3200 BC, while written records appeared at different times elsewhere. The date of 3200 BC therefore serves as a conventional endpoint for this timeline rather than a worldwide boundary between prehistory and recorded history. All dates are approximate and may be revised in light of new archaeological discoveries or analyses.

== Middle Paleolithic ==
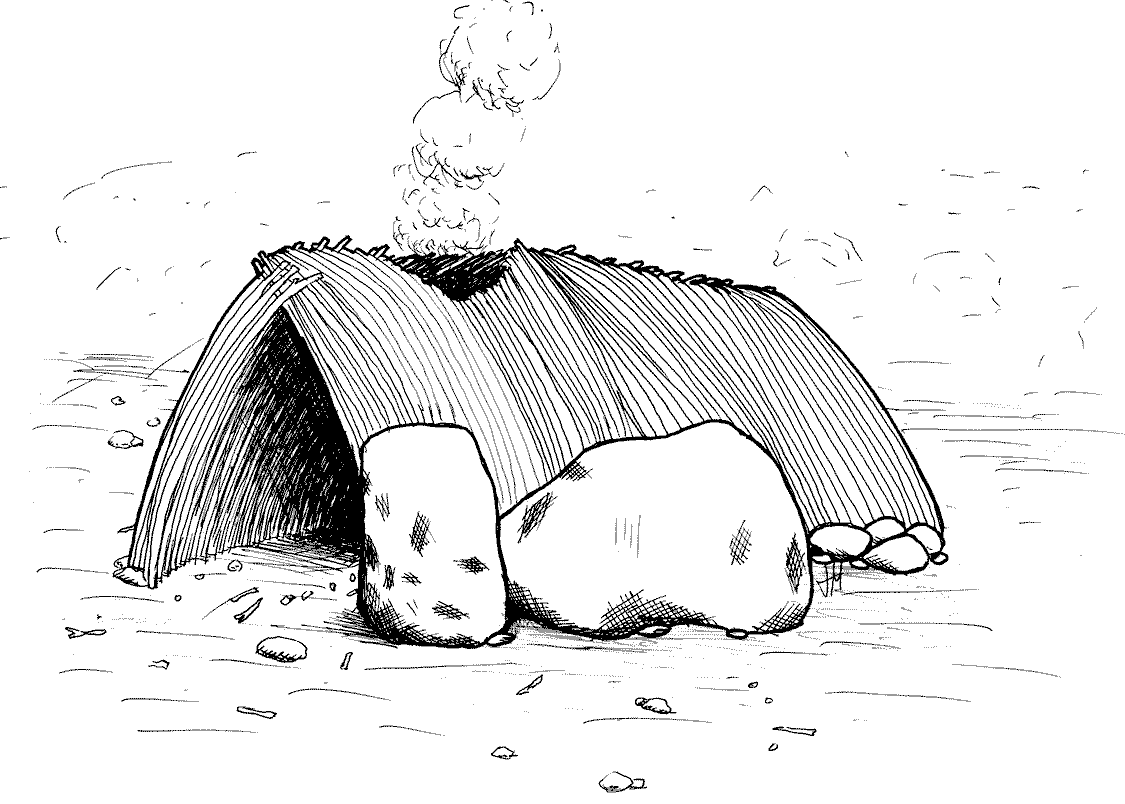
Postulated reconstruction of a Terra Amata hut

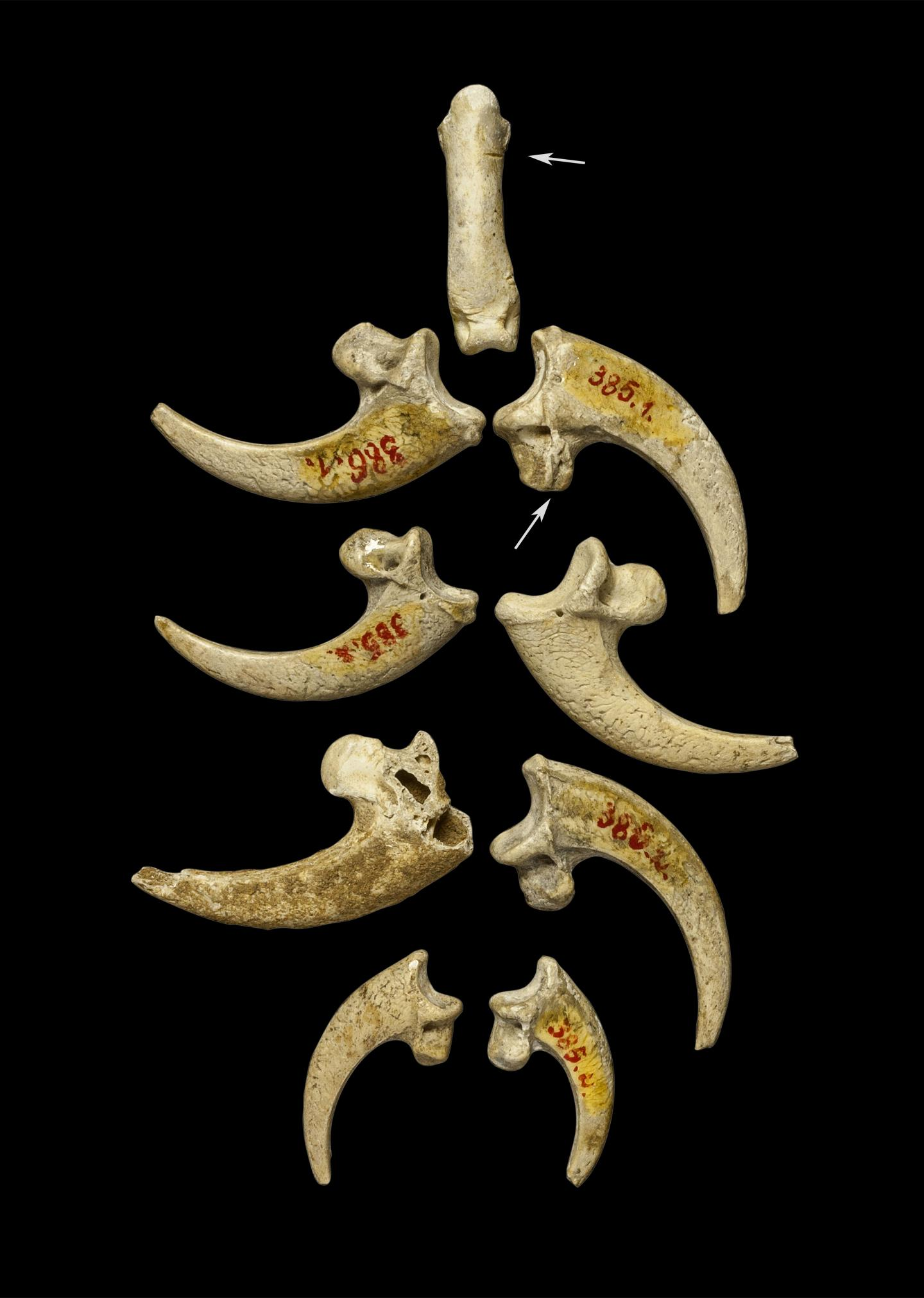
Speculative reconstruction of 130,000 year old white-tailed eagle talon jewellery from the Krapina Neanderthal site, Croatia (arrows indicate cut marks)

- 320 kya – 305 kya: Populations at Olorgesailie in southern Kenya undergo technological improvements in toolmaking and engage in long-distance trade.
- 315 kya: Approximate date of appearance of Homo sapiens (Jebel Irhoud, Morocco).
- 270 kya: Age of Y-DNA haplogroup A00 ("Y-chromosomal Adam").
- 250 kya: First appearance of Homo neanderthalensis (Saccopastore skulls).
- Before approximately 233 kya: The Omo I fossils from the Kibish Formation in Ethiopia provide evidence of early Homo sapiens. Dating of an overlying volcanic ash deposit indicates that the fossils are at least approximately 233,000 years old, with an uncertainty of ±22,000 years.
- 230 kya: Latest proposed date for the Terra Amata site, home of the first confirmed purpose-built structure and probably made by Homo heidelbergensis.
- 230 kya – 150 kya: Age of mt-DNA haplogroup L ("Mitochondrial Eve").
- 210 kya: Modern human presence in southeast Europe (Apidima, Greece).
- 200 kya: Oldest known grass bedding, including insect-repellent plants and ash layers beneath (possibly for a dirt-free, insulated base and to keep away arthropods).
- 194 kya – 177 kya: Modern human presence in West Asia (Misliya Cave in Israel).
- 170 kya: Humans are wearing clothing by this date.
- 164 kya: Human diet expands to include marine resources.
- 160 kya: Homo sapiens idaltu.
- 150 kya: Peopling of Africa: Khoisanid separation, age of mtDNA haplogroup L0.
- 139 ± 17 kya: Levallois core reductions, pointed tools and a variety of retouched artefacts at Retlapalle, India.
- 130 kya: Oldest evidence of ancient seafaring, from Crete (an island isolated from land for millions of years prior to human arrival).
- 125 kya: The peak of the Eemian interglacial period.
- 120 kya: Possibly the earliest evidence of use of symbols etched onto bone.
- 120 kya: Use of marine shells for personal decoration by humans, including Neanderthals.
- 120 kya – 90 kya: Abbassia Pluvial in North Africa—the Sahara desert region is wet and fertile.
- 120 kya – 75 kya: Khoisanid back-migration from Southern Africa to East Africa.
- 100 kya: Earliest structures in the world (sandstone blocks set in a semi-circle with an oval foundation) built in Egypt close to Wadi Halfa near the modern border with Sudan.
- 80 kya – 70 kya: Recent African origin: separation of sub-Saharan Africans and non-Africans.
- 75 kya: Eruption of the Toba supervolcano. It was originally thought that this event led to a genetic bottleneck in humans and perhaps other species, but more recent evidence makes this doubtful.
- 70 kya: Earliest example of abstract art or symbolic art from Blombos Cave, South Africa—stones engraved with grid or cross-hatch patterns.
- At least 67.8 kya: A hand stencil at Liang Metanduno cave on Muna Island, Sulawesi, Indonesia, provides the oldest securely dated evidence of rock art reported to date. Uranium-series dating of a calcite deposit overlying the pigment established that the image was created at least 67,800 years ago.

== Upper Paleolithic ==
"Epipaleolithic" or "Mesolithic" are terms for a transitional period between the Last Glacial Maximum and the Neolithic Revolution in Old World (Eurasian) cultures.

- 80 kya – 40 kya: Evidence of Australian Aboriginal culture
- 67 kya – 40 kya: Neanderthal admixture to Eurasians.
- 65 kya – 50 kya: Oldest site of human habitation in Australia, at Madjedbebe.
- At least 51.2 kya: A cave painting at Leang Karampuang on Sulawesi, Indonesia, depicts three human-like figures interacting with a pig. Dated using laser-ablation uranium-series analysis of overlying calcium carbonate deposits, the composition is the earliest known surviving example of figurative art and visual storytelling identified in a 2024 study.
- 50 kya: Earliest evidence of a sewing needle, made and used by Denisovans.
- 50 kya – 30 kya: Mousterian Pluvial in North Africa. The Sahara region is wet and fertile. Late Stone Age begins in Africa.
- c. 50 kya: Denisova hominin lives in the Altai Mountains, with oldest estimated to be c. 76 kya.
- At least 45.5 kya: A cave painting depicting a Celebes warty pig at Leang Tedongnge, Sulawesi, Indonesia, provides an early example of figurative animal art. Uranium-series dating of an overlying mineral deposit established a minimum age of 45,500 years.
- 45 kya – 43 kya: The first waves of Homo sapiens arrive in Europe, comprising the Early European modern humans.
- 45 kya – 40 kya: Châtelperronian cultures in France.
- 42 kya: Timeframe of the Laschamp event, the first geomagnetic excursion studied and one of the few full global magnetic field reversals known. Although many effects upon life on Earth and human evolution from the increase in cosmic rays have been tentatively proposed, the effects are not considered to have been strong enough (further refuted by paleoecological evidence) to have significantly affected natural or human history.
- 42 kya: Paleolithic flutes in Germany.
- 42 kya: Earliest evidence of advanced deep-sea fishing technology at the Jerimalai cave site in East Timor—demonstrates high-level maritime skills and by implication the technology needed to make ocean crossings to reach Australia and other islands, as they were catching and consuming large numbers of big deep sea fish such as tuna.
- 40 kya: Extinction of Homo neanderthalensis.

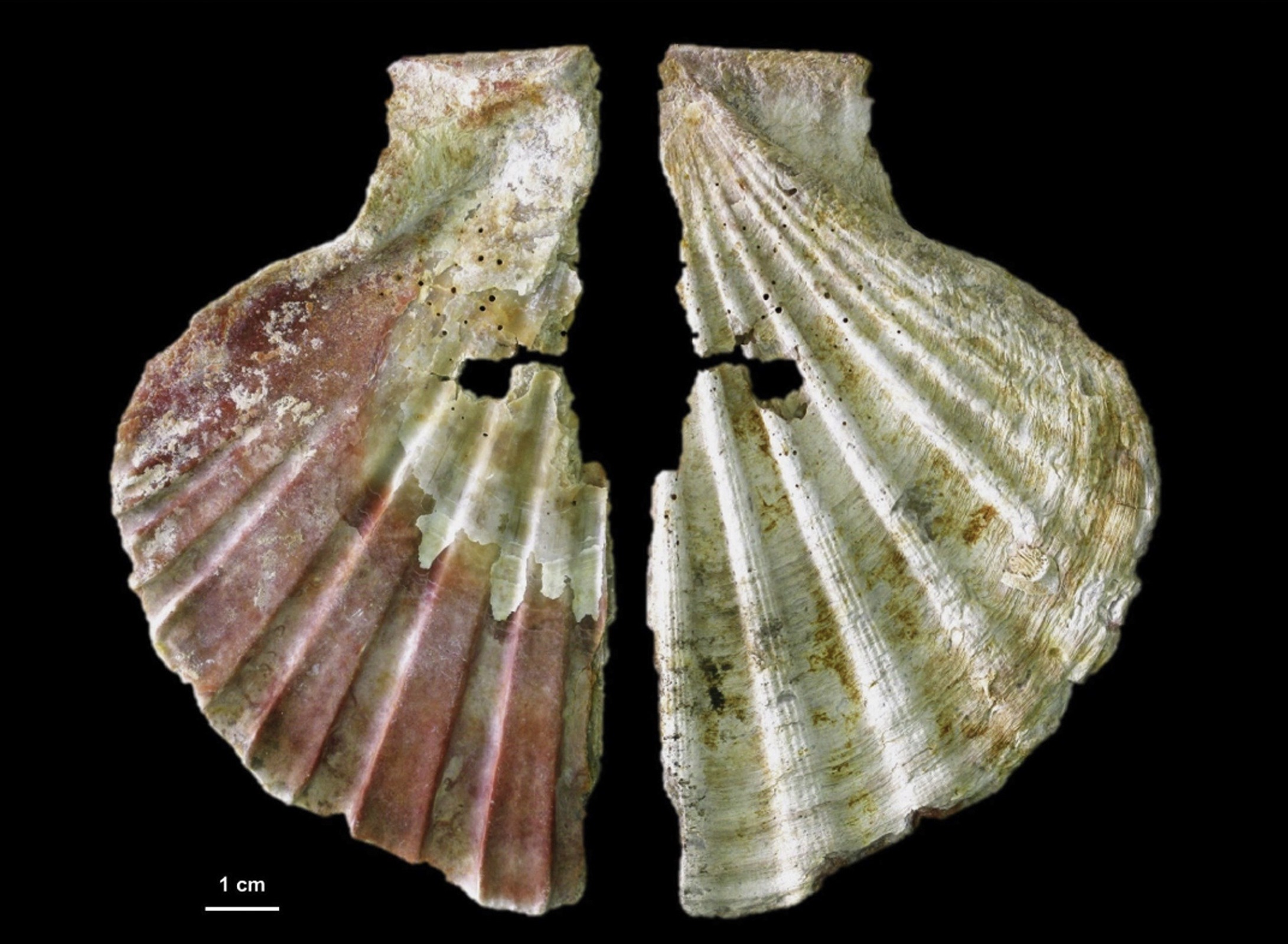
Painted king scallop ornament (likely Neanderthal) from Cueva Antón, 43,000 years ago.

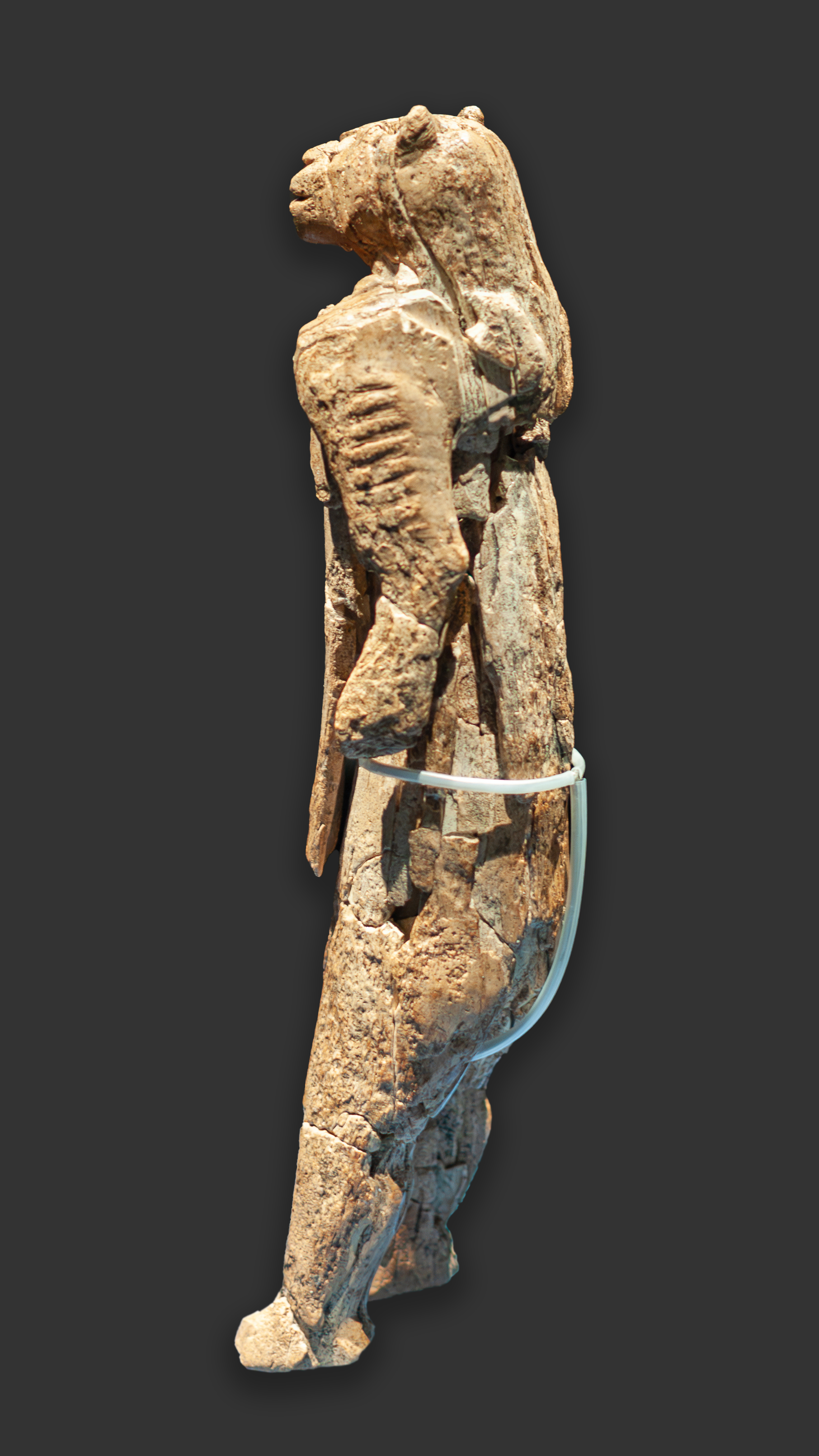
Lion-man sculpture (Aurignacian, 40,000–35,000 years old)

- 40 kya: Aurignacian culture begins in Europe.
- 40 kya: Oldest known figurative art the zoomorphic Löwenmensch figurine.
- 40 kya: Oldest known figurative art of a human figure as opposed to a zoomorphic figure (Venus of Hohle Fels).

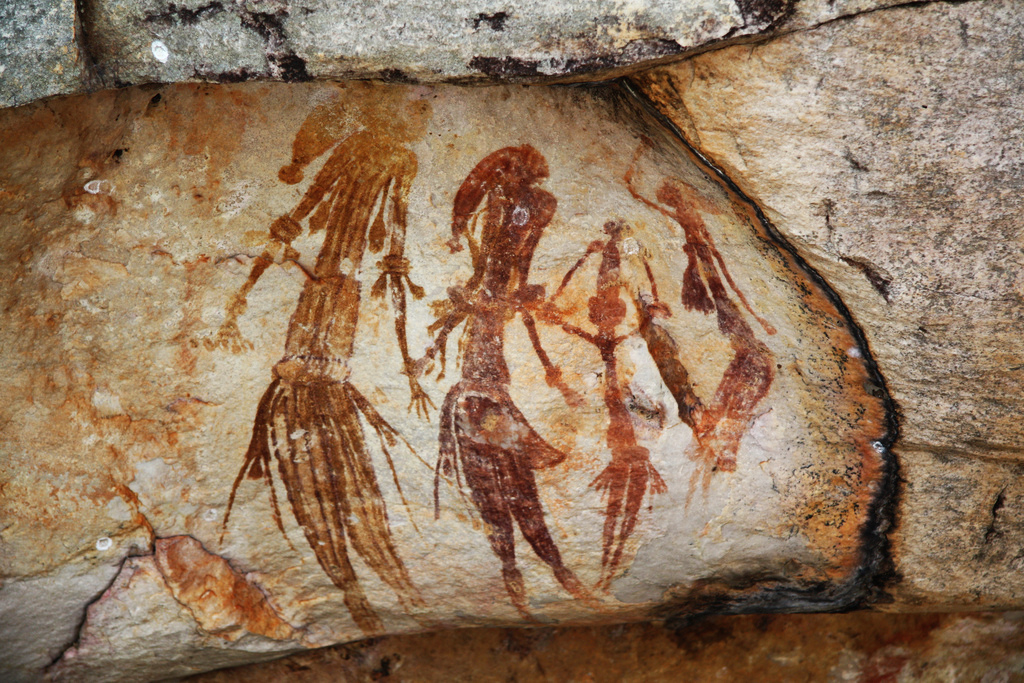
Gwion Gwion rock paintings found in the north-west Kimberley region of Western Australia

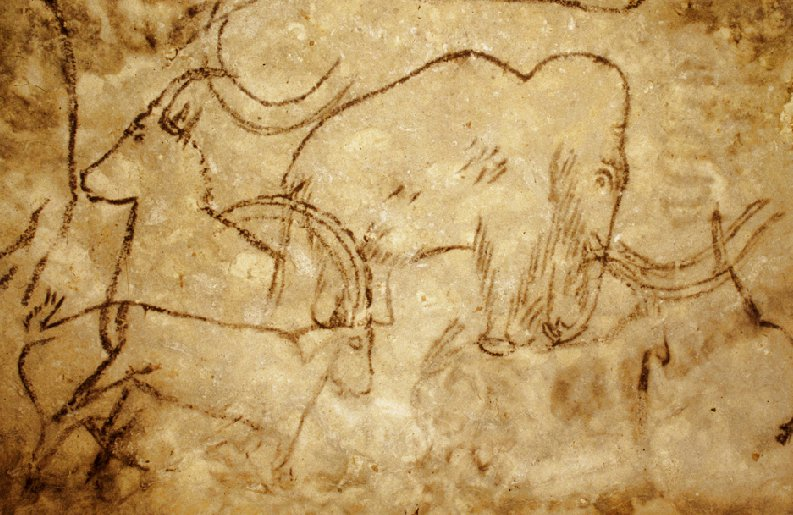
Magdalenian cave paintings of a woolly mammoth and ibex from Rouffignac Cave, France

- 40 kya – 30 kya: First human settlements formed by Aboriginal Australians in several areas that are today the cities of Sydney, Perth and Melbourne.
- 40 kya – 20 kya: Oldest known ritual cremation, the Mungo Lady, in Lake Mungo, Australia.
- 37 kya: A population of Basal Eurasians migrate to Europe. Unlike the Early European modern humans that inhabited Europe earlier, these populations form part of the ancestry of modern Europe.
- 36 kya: Evidence of humans using fibers in a cave in present-day Georgia.
- 33 kya: Earliest evidence of humanoids in Ireland.
- 33 kya – 22 kya: Gravettian period in Europe.
- 31 kya: Earth ovens in Central Europe.
- 31 kya – 16 kya: Last Glacial Maximum (peak at 26,500 years ago).
- 30 kya: Rock paintings tradition begins in Bhimbetka rock shelters in India, which presently as a collection is the densest known concentration of rock art. In an area about 10 km^{2}, there are about 800 rock shelters of which 500 contain paintings.
- 28.5 kya: New Guinea is populated by colonists from Asia or Australia.
- 28 kya: Oldest known twisted rope.
- 28 kya – 24 kya: Oldest known pottery—used to make figurines rather than cooking or storage vessels (Venus of Dolní Věstonice).
- 27 kya – 25 kya: The last volcanic supereruption occurs – the Oruanui eruption at Taupō Volcano in New Zealand (which was not inhabited by humans until the 2nd millennium CE); however, any global effects would be difficult to distinguish from those of the nearly-simultaneous Last Glacial Maximum (see above).
- 25 kya: A hamlet consisting of huts built of rocks and of mammoth bones is founded in what is now Dolní Věstonice in Moravia in the Czech Republic. Dolní Věstonice (archaeological site) is the oldest human permanent settlement that has yet been found by archaeologists.
- 25 kya: Ancient North Eurasians migrate into eastern Siberia, intermixing with the local Ancient East Asian populations. Their descendants migrated into Beringia, where they became (or helped form) the Ancestral Native Americans.
- 24 kya – 15 kya: General timeframe for the Mal'ta–Buret' culture near Lake Baikal, the archaeological culture whose human remains serve as the type for the Ancient North Eurasian (ANE) population which appeared some time prior. Mal'ta-Buret' sites consisted of temporary mammoth-bone huts for reindeer hunters, yet their art is among the most sophisticated of their time, having many parallels with carvings elsewhere in Eurasia (for example, their Venus figurines), indicative of long-distance exchange of ideas. Both Europeans and American Indians share significant ANE ancestry.
- 24 kya: The cave bear is thought to have become extinct.
- 24 kya: Evidence suggests humans living in Alaska and Yukon North America.
- 23 kya: A population of wolves are hypothesized to have begun cohabiting with Ancient North Eurasians for shared food, protection, and (possibly later) hunting success. This commensal relationship is thought to have led to the domestication of the dog, which genetic studies show their ancestry diverging from wolves at this time along with an increase in population. At the Yana Rhinoceros Horn Site, smaller wolf-like canids with neotenous features and signs of being cared for have been observed.
- 23 kya – 21 kya: The earliest known human footprints in North America are left at what is now White Sands National Park, New Mexico.
- 21 kya: Artifacts suggest early human activity occurred in Canberra, the capital city of Australia.
- 20 kya: Kebaran culture in the Levant: beginning of the Epipalaeolithic in the Levant.
- 20 kya: Theorized earliest date of development of traditional Arctic clothing like those used by Arctic Eurasians and Inuit.
- 20 kya – 19 kya: Earliest pottery use, in Xianren Cave, China.
- 20 kya – 18 kya: Minatogawa Man (Proto-Mongoloid phenotype) in Okinawa, Japan.
- 20 kya – 10 kya: Khoisanid expansion to Central Africa.
- 18 kya – 12 kya: Though estimations vary widely, it is believed by scholars that Afro-Asiatic was spoken as a single language around this time period.
- 18 kya: The Magdalenian culture appears in Europe. They are responsible for some of the most complex and famous artistic traditions of Ice Age Europe, creating the cave paintings of Lascaux and Altamira, as well as numerous carvings in ivory and stone.
- 17 kya: The earliest gene for blond hair is found among Ancient North Eurasians at the Afontova Gora site in Siberia.
- 16 kya – 11 kya: Caucasus hunter-gatherer expansion to Europe.
- 16 kya: Wisent (European bison) sculpted in clay deep inside the cave now known as Le Tuc d'Audoubert in the French Pyrenees near what is now the border of Spain.
- 14.2 kya: The oldest agreed domestic dog remains belongs to the Bonn–Oberkassel dog that was buried with two humans.
- 14 kya: Y-chromosome haplogroup R1b, normally associated with the Near East at this time, appears in Italy.
- 14 kya: Western Hunter Gatherers of the Epigravettian culture expand into Europe and replace the Magdalenian culture.
- 14 kya – 12 kya: Oldest evidence for prehistoric warfare (Jebel Sahaba, Natufian culture).
- 13 kya – 10 kya: End of the Last Glacial Period, climate warms, glaciers recede.
- 13 kya: A major water outbreak occurs on Lake Agassiz in central North America, which at the time could have been the size of the current Black Sea and the largest lake on Earth. Much of the lake is drained in the Arctic Ocean through the Mackenzie River.
- 13 kya – 10 kya: Earliest dates suggested for the domestication of the sheep, in Mesopotamia.
- 12.9 kya – 11.7 kya: The Younger Dryas, a period of sudden cooling and return to glacial conditions.
- 12 kya: Volcanic eruptions in the Virunga Mountains blocked Lake Kivu outflow into Lake Edward and the Nile system, diverting the water to Lake Tanganyika. Nile's total length is shortened and Lake Tanganyika's surface is increased.

== Holocene ==
The terms "Neolithic" and "Bronze Age" are culture-specific and are mostly limited to cultures of select parts of the Old World, namely Europe, Western and South Asia. Chronological periodizations typically base their periods on one or more identifiable and unique markers associated with a culturally distinct era (within a given interaction sphere), but these markers are not necessarily intrinsic to the cultural evolution of the era's people.

As such, the terms become less applicable when their markers correlate less with cultural evolution. Therefore, the Neolithic and the Neolithic Revolution have little to do with the Americas, where several different chronologies are used instead depending on the area (e.g. the Andean Preceramic, the North American Archaic and Formative periods). Similarly, since there is no appreciable cultural shift between the use of stone, bronze, and iron in East and Southeast Asia, the term "Bronze Age" is not considered to apply to this region the same as western Eurasia, and "Iron Age" is essentially never used. In sub-Saharan Africa, iron metallurgy was developed prior to any knowledge of bronze and possibly before iron's adoption in Eurasia and despite Postclassic Mesoamerica developing and using bronze, it did not have a significant bearing on its continued cultural evolution in the same way as western Eurasia.

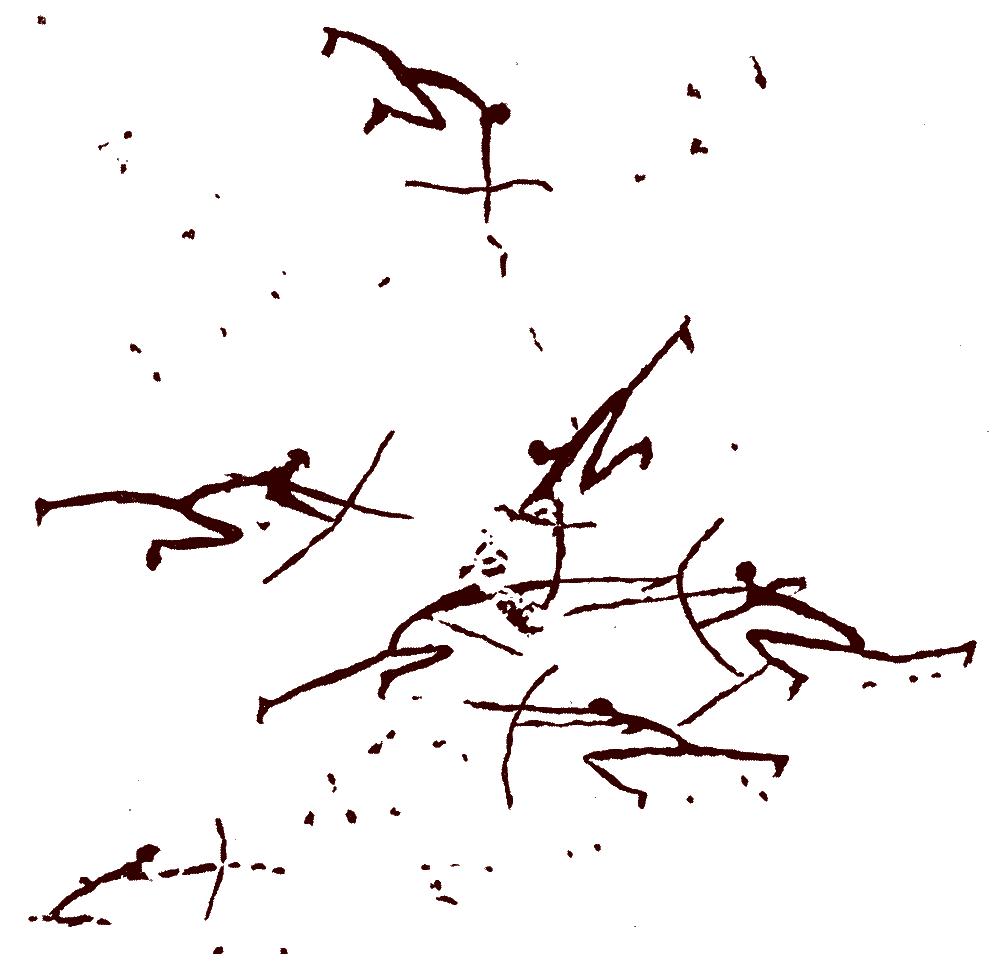
Cave painting of a battle between archers, Morella, Spain, the oldest known depiction of combat. These paintings date from 7200 to 7400 years ago.

- 9700 BC: An abrupt period of global warming begins. This is taken as the beginning of the Holocene geological epoch.
- 9600 BC: Jericho has evidence of settlement dating back to 9,600 BC. Jericho was a popular camping ground for Natufian hunter-gatherer groups, who left a scattering of crescent microlith tools behind them.
- 9400 BC: Earliest supposed date for the domestication of the pig.
- 9200 BC – 9000 BC: Meltwater pulse 1B, a sudden rise of sea level by 7.5 m (25 ft) within about 160 years.
- 9000 BC: Earliest date recorded for construction of temenoi ceremonial structures at Göbekli Tepe in southern Turkey, as possibly the oldest surviving proto-religious site on Earth.
- 9000 BC: Giant short-faced bears and giant ground sloths go extinct. Equidae goes extinct in North America.
- 8900 BC – 8300 BC: The Indigenous peoples of the southwestern Amazon basin domesticate cassava, the first domestic crop in the New World, followed by squash and dozens of tree species. They also begin intensively modifying the Amazonian landscape, foresting open savannahs and permanently increasing the biomass and biodiversity of the modern Amazon rainforest.
- 8800 BC – 7000 BC: Byblos appears to have been settled during the PPNB period. Neolithic remains of some buildings can be observed at the site.
- 8500 BC: Earliest supposed date for the domestication of cattle.
- 8000 BC: Earliest dates suggested for the domestication of the goat.
- 8000 BC: The Quaternary extinction event, which has been ongoing since the mid-Pleistocene, concludes. Many of the ice age megafauna go extinct, including the megatherium, woolly rhinoceros, Irish elk, cave bear, cave lion, and the last of the sabre-toothed cats. The mammoth goes extinct in Eurasia and North America, but is preserved in small island populations until ~1650 BC.
- 8000 BC – 7000 BC: In northern Mesopotamia, now northern Iraq, cultivation of barley and wheat begins. At first they are used for beer, gruel, and soup, eventually for bread. In early agriculture at this time, the planting stick is used, but it is replaced by a primitive plow in subsequent centuries. Around this time, a round stone tower, now preserved to about 8.5 metres (28 ft) high and 8.5 metres (28 ft) in diameter is built in Jericho.
- 8000 BC – 6000 BC: The post-glacial sea level rise decelerates, slowing the submersion of landmasses that had taken place over the previous 10,000 years.
- 8000 BC – 5000 BC: Large animals such as deer and elk are drawn on Rock Drawings in Valcamonica (Lombardy).
- 8000 BC – 3000 BC: Identical ancestors point: sometime in this period lived the latest subgroup of human population consisting of those that were all common ancestors of all present day humans, the rest having no present day descendants.
- 7500 BC – 3500 BC: Neolithic Subpluvial in North Africa. The Sahara desert region supports a savanna-like environment. Lake Chad is larger than the current Caspian Sea. An African culture develops across the current Sahel region.
- 7500 BC: Çatalhöyük urban settlement founded in Anatolia.
- 7500 BC: Earliest supposed date for the domestication of the cat.
- 7200 BC: First human settlement in Amman, Jordan; ʿAin Ghazal Neolithic settlement was built spanning over an area of 15 hectares (37 acres).
- 7176 BC: Earliest confirmed Miyake event, an extreme peak of solar activity which showers the Solar System with cosmic rays and radiation.
- 7000 BC – 6000 BC: Early European Farmers arrive in Europe through Anatolia. They replace Western Hunter Gatherer populations in many areas, intermix in others, and introduce agriculture into Europe.
- 7000 BC: Maize is domesticated in southern Mexico from the wild (and significantly different) teosinte and quickly becomes the dominant staple of Mesoamerica, heralding the beginning of agriculture and further domestications in the region.
- 7000 BC: The Kuk Swamp in the highlands of Papua New Guinea becomes a cradle of agriculture. Early farmers dig canals that transform the swamp into arable land. They domesticate bananas, sugarcane, taro, lesser yam, and raise cassowaries from captured eggs (which had been done as early as 18,000 years ago).
- 7000 BC: Jiahu culture begins in China.
- 7000 BC: First large-scale fish fermentation in southern Sweden.
- 7000 BC: Human settlement of Mehrgarh, Pakistan is one of the earliest sites with evidence of farming and herding in South Asia. In April 2006, Nature note that the oldest (and first early Neolithic) evidence for the drilling of human teeth in vivo (i.e. in a living person) was found in Mehrgarh.
- 6200 BC – 6000 BC: The 8.2-kiloyear event, a sudden decrease of global temperatures, probably caused by the final collapse of the Laurentide Ice Sheet, which leads to drier conditions in East Africa and Mesopotamia.
- 6200 BC – 5600 BC: Sudden rise in sea level (Meltwater pulse 1C) by 6.5 m (21 ft) in less than 140 years; this concludes the early Holocene sea level rise and sea level remains largely stable throughout the Neolithic.
- 6000 BC – 3000 BC: Development of proto-writing in China, Southeast Europe (Vinca symbols), and West Asia (proto-literate cuneiform).
- 6000 BC: Evidence of habitation at the current site of Aleppo dates to about c. 8,000 years ago, although excavations at Tell Qaramel, 25 kilometres (16 mi) north of the city show the area was inhabited about 13,000 years ago, Carbon-14 dating at Tell Ramad, on the outskirts of Damascus, suggests that the site may have been occupied since the second half of the seventh millennium BC, possibly around 6300 BC. However, evidence of settlement in the wider Barada basin dating back to 9000 BC exists.
- 6000 BC – 5000 BC: The earliest New World ceramics are created in the Amazon basin.
- 5700 BC – 4500 BC: Vinča culture.
- 5500 BC: Copper smelting in evidence in Pločnik and Belovode.
- 5259 BC: Confirmed Miyake event, with high amount of cosmic radiation from the Sun hitting the Earth.
- 4500 BC: The oldest known gold hoard deposited at Varna Necropolis, Bulgaria.
- 4300 BC: Akahoya eruption creates the Kikai Caldera and ends the earliest homogeneous Jomon culture in Japan. When the Jomon culture recovers, it shows regional differences.
- 4050 BC – 4000 BC: Trypillian build in Nebelivka (Ukraine) settlement which reached 15,000–18,000 inhabitants.
- 4130 BC: Toggling harpoons are invented somewhere in eastern Siberia, spreading south into Japan and east into North America, where they are ancestral to the sophisticated designs of the Inuit and later European whalers.

=== 4th millennium BC ===
- 4000 BC: Civilizations develop in the Mesopotamia/Fertile Crescent region (around the location of modern-day Iraq).
- 4000 BC: Earliest supposed dates for the domestication of the horse, the domestication of the chicken, and the invention of the potter's wheel.
- 4000 BC – 2000 BC: The Dene-Yeniseian languages split into Na-Dene in North America and Yeniseian languages in Siberia. The connection is commonly thought to have been the result of a back-migration of early American Indians in Beringia back into Siberia, forming the Yeniseian peoples that were once widespread throughout Eurasia. However, recent studies indicating the existence of a linguistic and technological continuum extending into the Common Era make the directionality of migration and the homeland of Dene-Yeniseian more difficult to determine.
- 3840 BC – 3800 BC: The Post Track and Sweet Track causeways are constructed in the Somerset Levels.
- 3800 BC: Trypillian build in Talianki (Ukraine) settlement which reached 15,600–21,000 inhabitants.
- 3700 BC: Mass graves at Tell Brak in Syria.
- 3700 BC: Trypillian build in Maidanets (Ukraine) settlement which reached 12,000–46,000 inhabitants, and built three-story building.
- 3600 BC: The first monumental buildings are constructed in Sechin Bajo, an urban center in what is now coastal Peru. It belonged to the Casma–Sechin culture, possibly the oldest civilization in the Americas.
- 3500 BC: Uruk period in Sumer.
- 3500 BC: First evidence of mummification in Egypt.
- 3500 BC: Earliest conjectured date for the still-undeciphered Indus script.
- 3500 BC: End of the African humid period possibly linked to the Piora Oscillation: a rapid and intense aridification event, which probably started the current Sahara Desert dry phase and a population increase in the Nile Valley due to migrations from nearby regions. It is also believed this event contributed to the end of the Ubaid period in Mesopotamia.
- 3400 BC: Oldest known depiction of a wheeled vehicle (Bronocice pot, Funnelbeaker culture).
- 3400 BC: Waun Mawn is built in West Wales.
- 3300 BC: Bronze Age begins in the Near East. Hakra Phase of the Indus Valley Civilisation begins in the Indian subcontinent.
- 3300 BC: Newgrange is built in Ireland. Ness of Brodgar is built in Orkney
- 3200 BC – 2500 BC: The Norte Chico or Caral–Supe civilization begins on the coast of Peru with a wave of monumental construction and founding of the first cities in the Americas. It is generally considered the oldest civilization in the Americas.
- 3200 BC: The Yamnaya culture appears on the Pontic–Caspian steppe. They most likely spoke the Proto-Indo-European language and may have been responsible for domesticating the horse, initiating the Indo-European migrations after a period of European population decline opened up areas for settlement, and both evolving and spreading the European alleles for lactase persistence.
- 3200 BC: Sumerian cuneiform writing system is first used, triggering the beginning of recorded history.

== Research ==
Researchers deduced in a scientific review that "no specific point in time can currently be identified at which modern human ancestry was confined to a limited birthplace" and that current knowledge about long, continuous and complex – e.g. often non-singular, parallel, nonsimultaneous and/or gradual – emergences of characteristics is consistent with a range of evolutionary histories. A timeline dating first occurrences and earliest evidence may therefore be an often inadequate approach for describing humanity's (pre-)history.

== Post-historical prehistories ==
- 3,800 years ago (1800 BC): Currently undeciphered Minoan script (Linear A) and Cypro-Minoan script developed on Crete and Cyprus.
- 3,450 years ago (1450 BC): Mycenaean Greece, first deciphered writing in Europe
- 3,200 years ago (1200 BC): Oracle bone script, first written records in Old Chinese
- 3,050–2,800 years ago (1050 BC to 800 BC): Alphabetic writing; the Phoenician alphabet spreads around the Mediterranean
- 2,300 years ago (300 BC): Maya script, the only known full writing system developed in the Americas, emerges.
- 2,260 years ago (260 BC): Earliest deciphered written records in South Asia (Middle Indo-Aryan)
- 1800s AD: Undeciphered Rongorongo script on Easter Island may mark the latest independent development of writing.

== See also ==
- Timeline of human evolution
- List of languages by first written account
- List of Stone Age art
- Timeline of ancient history
- Chronology of the universe
- Timeline of historic inventions
- Timeline of life
- List of periods and events in climate history
- Articles in Category:Millennia

Prehistory by world region

- Near East
  - Prehistoric Mesopotamia (before 3000 BC)
  - Prehistoric Egypt (before 3000 BC)
  - Prehistory of Anatolia (before 2000 BC)
  - Prehistory of Iran (before 1000 BC)
  - Prehistoric Caucasus (before 1000 BC)
- Prehistoric China (before 1000 BC)
- Prehistoric Europe (before 800 BC)
- Prehistory of Central Asia (before 600 BC)
- Prehistoric Siberia (before AD 500)
- Pre-Columbian Americas (before 1492)
- Prehistory of Australia (before 1788)

== Bibliography ==
- Burns, Ross (2005). Damascus: A History. Routledge. ISBN 978-1-134-48850-6.
- Kristiansen, Kristian; Larsson, Thomas B. (2005). The Rise of Bronze Age Society: Travels, Transmissions and Transformations. Cambridge University Press. ISBN 978-0-521-84363-8.
- Turner II, Christy G.; Ovodov, Nicolai D.; Pavlova, Olga V. (2013). Animal Teeth and Human Tools: A Taphonomic Odyssey in Ice Age Siberia. Cambridge University Press. ISBN 978-1-107-03029-9.
