= Past sea level =

Sea level variations over geological time scales

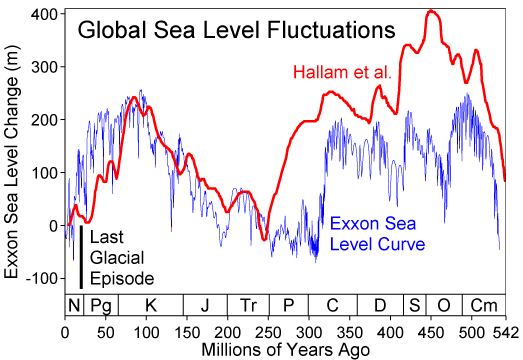
Comparison of two sea level reconstructions during the last 500 million years. The scale of change during the last glacial/interglacial transition is indicated with a black bar.

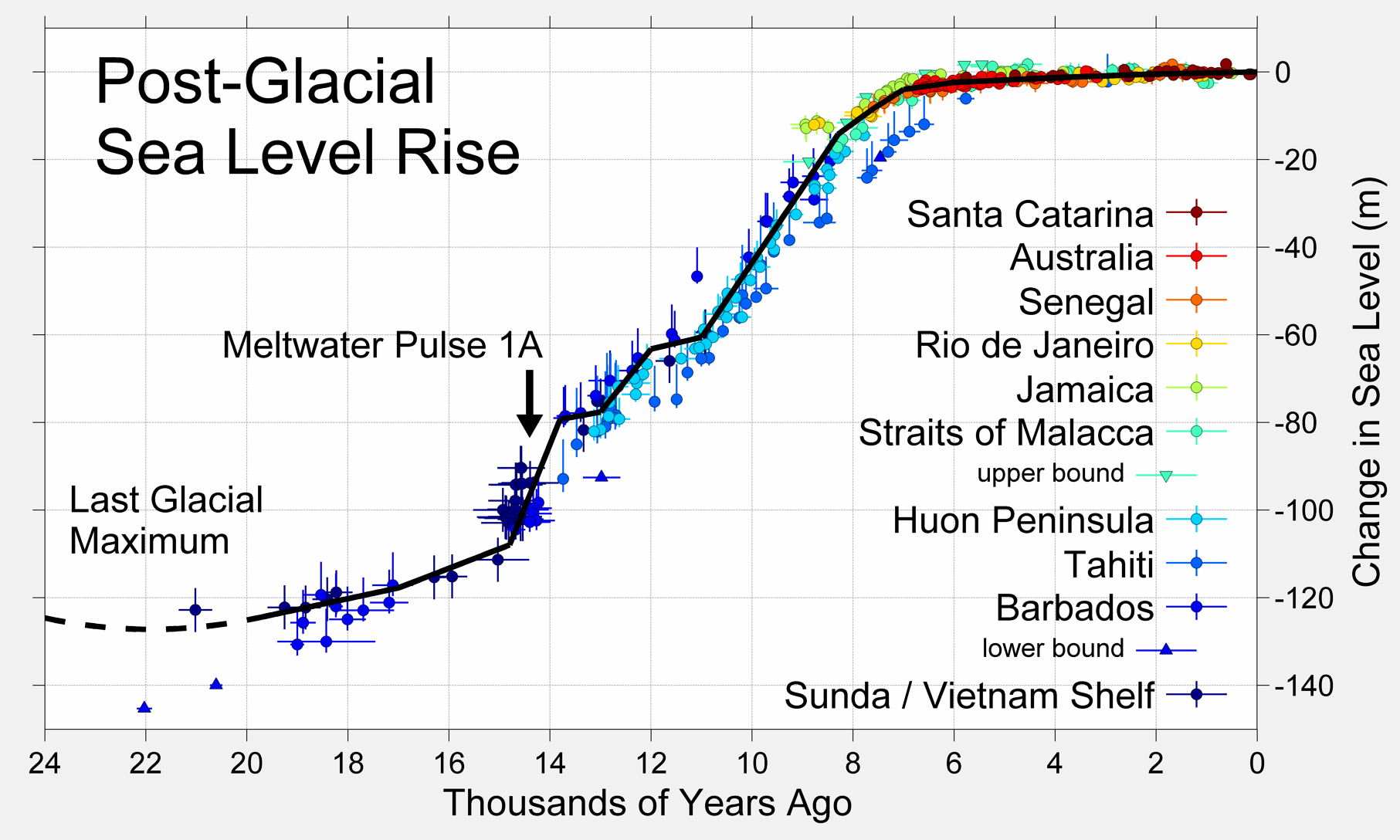
Sea level rise since the Last Glacial Maximum.

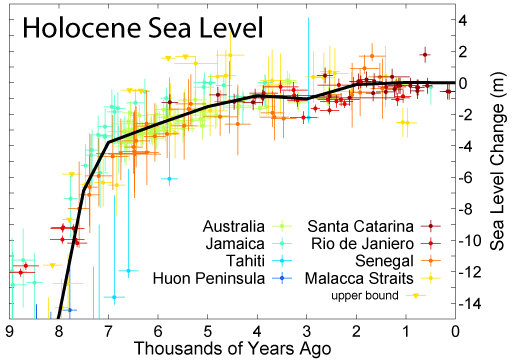
Holocene sea level rise.

Global or barystatic sea level has fluctuated significantly over Earth's history. Over geologic time scales, the primary factors affecting sea level are the volume of available water due to growth or melting of ice caps, and the storage volume of the ocean basins due to plate tectonics. The secondary and tertiary influences on water volume are sedimentation, oceanic plume volcanism, the temperature of the seawater, which affects density, and the amounts of water retained in other reservoirs like aquifers, glaciers, lakes, and rivers. In addition to these global changes, local changes in sea level are caused by Earth's crust uplift, known as dynamic topography, and subsidence.

Over geologic timescales sea level has fluctuated by more than hundreds of metres. In Archean times, most of the earth was covered by water, and early oceanic crust was relatively shallow. With time oceanic crustal composition changed, plate tectonics commenced at some point in the Proterozoic, and oceanic crust became older and deeper, creating oceans such as we have currently. During the Phanerozoic, for which more geological information is available, i.e. marine fossils, sea level fluctuated by several hundreds of meters, with the highest peaks generally reconstructed during the middle Paleozoic, and Cretaceous.

The main reasons for sea level fluctuations in the last ~30 million years are due to fluctuations in the volumes of the Antarctic ice sheet and starting ~5 million years ago the Greenland ice sheet.

Considering the past several million years, fluctuations in ice and sea level, are being caused by the Milankovitch cycles. Current sea level is about 130 metres higher than the lowest minimum. Low levels were reached during the Last Glacial Maximum (LGM), about 20,000 years ago. The last time the sea level was higher than today was during the Eemian, about 130,000 years ago.

Over a shorter timescale, the low level reached during the LGM rebounded in the early Holocene, between about 14,000 and 6,500 years ago, leading to a 110 m sea level rise. Sea levels have been comparatively stable over the past 6,500 years, ending with a 0.50 m sea level rise over the past 1,500 years. For example, about 10,200 years ago the last land bridge between mainland Europe and Great Britain was submerged, leaving behind a salt marsh. By 8000 years ago the marshes were drowned by the sea, leaving no trace of any former dry land connection. Observational and modeling studies of mass loss from glaciers and ice caps indicate a contribution to a sea-level rise of 2 to 4 cm over the 20th century.

Geological proxies suggest the Holocene experienced three distinct phases: rapid rise (11,700-4,200 years ago) as continental ice sheets melted, with rates declining from >10 mm/yr to <1 mm/yr; a remarkable 4,000-year period of stability (~4,200 years ago-1850s) with rates fluctuating around 0 mm/yr; and modern acceleration (1850s-present) driven by human-caused greenhouse gas emissions, increasing from 0.1 ± 0.2 mm/yr in the early 1800s to 1.5 ± 0.2 mm/yr since 1900—a rate extremely likely to exceed any century in at least the previous 4,000 years.

== Glaciers and ice caps ==
Each year about 8 mm (0.3 inches) of water from the entire surface of the oceans falls onto the Antarctica and Greenland ice sheets as snowfall. Slightly more water returns to the ocean in icebergs, from ice melting at the edges, and from rivers of meltwater flowing from ice sheets to the sea. The change in the total mass of ice on land, called the mass balance, is important because it causes changes in global sea level. High-precision gravimetry from satellites in low-noise flight has determined that in 2006, the Greenland and Antarctic ice sheets experienced a combined mass loss of 475 ± 158 Gt/yr, equivalent to 1.3 ± 0.4 mm/yr sea level rise. Notably, the acceleration in ice sheet loss over the period 1988–2006 was 22 ± 1 Gt/yr² for Greenland and 14.5 ± 2 Gt/yr² for Antarctica, for a total of 36 ± 2 Gt/yr². By 2010 the acceleration had increased to over 50 Gt/yr². This acceleration is 3 times larger than for mountain glaciers and ice caps (12 ± 6 Gt/yr²).

Ice shelves float on the surface of the sea and, if they melt, to first order they do not change sea level. Likewise, the melting of the northern polar ice cap which is composed of floating pack ice would not significantly contribute to rising sea levels. However, because floating ice pack is lower in salinity than seawater, their melting would cause a very small increase in sea levels, so small that it is generally neglected.

- Scientists previously lacked knowledge of changes in terrestrial storage of water. Surveying of water retention by soil absorption and by artificial reservoirs ("impoundment") show that a total of about 10,800 cubic kilometres (2,591 cubic miles) of water (just under the size of Lake Huron) has been impounded on land since 1930. Such impoundment masked about 30 mm (1.2 in) of sea level rise in that time.
- Conversely estimates of excess global groundwater extraction during 1900–2008 totals ~4,500 km3, equivalent to a sea-level rise of 12.6 mm (0.50 in) (>6% of the total). Furthermore, the rate of groundwater depletion has increased markedly since about 1950, with maximum rates occurring during the most recent period (2000–2008), when it averaged ~145 km3/yr (equivalent to 0.40 mm/yr of sea-level rise, or 13% of the reported rate of 3.1 mm/yr during this recent period).
- If small glaciers and polar ice caps on the margins of Greenland and the Antarctic Peninsula melt, the projected rise in sea level will be around 0.5 m (1 ft 7.7 in). Melting of the Greenland ice sheet would produce 7.2 m (23.6 ft) of sea-level rise, and melting of the Antarctic ice sheet would produce 61.1 m (200.5 ft) of sea level rise. The collapse of the grounded interior reservoir of the West Antarctic Ice Sheet would raise sea level by 5 m (16.4 ft) - 6 m (19.7 ft).
- The snowline altitude is the altitude of the lowest elevation interval in which minimum annual snow cover exceeds 50%. This ranges from about 5,500 metres (18,045 feet) above sea-level at the equator down to sea level at about 70° N&S latitude, depending on regional temperature amelioration effects. Permafrost then appears at sea level and extends deeper below sea level polewards.
- As most of the Greenland and Antarctic ice sheets lie above the snowline and/or base of the permafrost zone, they will melt more slowly than ice shelves. Some estimates have them melting over several millennia even if temperatures continue to rise. However rising temperatures shift the permafrost zone, and the ice sheets also contribute to sea level rise through enhanced flow and iceberg calving.
- By the 2010s, Greenland was contributing roughly 0.8 mm/yr to sea level rise, and Antarctica was contributing roughly 0.4 mm/yr, both accelerating by 10%/yr (a doubling time of 7 years). Climate models estimate they will contribute 1 m - 2 m to sea level rise by 2100, mostly in the latter half of the century

As of the early 2000s, the current rise in sea level observed from tide gauges, of about 3.4 mm/yr, is within the estimate range from the combination of factors above, but active research continues in this field.

== Geological influences ==
At times during Earth's long history, the configuration and age of the continents and oceans, has changed due to plate tectonics. This affects global sea level by altering the depths of ocean basins, and hence storage volume, and also by altering the availability of land at high latitudes for ice sheet formation, with resulting changes both long term (>1 million years), and short term (<1 million years) with glacial-interglacial cycles due to Milankovitch cyclicity.

The depth of the ocean basins is a function of the age of oceanic lithosphere (the tectonic plates beneath the floors of the world's oceans). As older plates age, they become denser and subside. Eventually (old) oceanic crust may subduct at subduction zones, and their surface area will be replaced elsewhere by new crust by spreading at mid-ocean-ridges elsewhere. Therefore, a configuration with many small oceanic plates that rapidly recycle the oceanic lithosphere would produce shallower ocean basins and (all other things being equal) higher sea levels i.e. during the Cretaceous. A configuration with fewer plates and more cold, dense oceanic lithosphere, on the other hand, would result in deeper ocean basins and lower sea levels i.e. during the Neogene.

When there was much continental crust near the poles, the rock record shows unusually low sea levels during ice ages, because there was much polar land mass on which snow and ice could accumulate. During times when the land masses clustered around the equator, ice ages had much less effect on sea level, as there were no land masses at the poles where ice sheets formed.

Over most of geologic time, the long-term mean sea level has been higher than today (see graph above). Only during the Carboniferous or at the Permian-Triassic boundary ~250 million years ago was the long-term mean sea level lower than today. Long term changes in the mean sea level are the result of changes in the oceanic crust, with a downward trend expected to continue in the very long term at multi-million year time scales.

During the glacial-interglacial cycles over the past few million years, the mean sea level has varied by somewhat more than a hundred metres. This is primarily due to the growth and decay of ice sheets (mostly in the northern hemisphere).

The Mediterranean Basin's gradual growth as the Neotethys basin, begun in the Jurassic, did not suddenly affect ocean levels. While the Mediterranean was forming during the past 100 million years, the average ocean level was generally 200 metres above current levels. However, the largest known example of marine flooding was when the Atlantic breached the Strait of Gibraltar at the end of the Messinian Salinity Crisis about 5.2 million years ago. This restored Mediterranean Sea levels at the sudden end of the period when that basin had dried up, apparently due to geologic forces in the area of the Strait.

Long-term causes	Range of effect	Vertical effect
Change in volume of ocean basins
Plate tectonics and seafloor spreading at mid-ocean-ridges (plate divergence) leading to changes in seafloor elevation	Eustatic	0.01 mm/yr
Marine sedimentation	Eustatic	< 0.01 mm/yr
Change in mass of ocean water
Melting or accumulation of continental ice	Eustatic	10 mm/yr
• Climate changes during the 20th century
•• Antarctica	Eustatic	0.39 to 0.79 mm/yr
•• Greenland (from changes in both precipitation and runoff)	Eustatic	0.0 to 0.1 mm/yr
• Long-term adjustment to the end of the last ice age
•• Greenland and Antarctica contribution over 20th century	Eustatic	0.0 to 0.5 mm/yr
Release of water from Earth's interior	Eustatic	
Release or accumulation of continental hydrologic reservoirs	Eustatic	
Uplift or subsidence of Earth's surface (Isostasy)
Thermal-isostasy (temperature/density changes in Earth's interior)	Local effect	
Glacio-isostasy (loading or unloading of ice)	Local effect	10 mm/yr
Hydro-isostasy (loading or unloading of water)	Local effect	
Volcano-isostasy (magmatic extrusions)	Local effect	
Sediment-isostasy (deposition and erosion of sediments)	Local effect	< 4 mm/yr
Tectonic uplift/subsidence
Vertical and horizontal motions of crust (in response to fault motions)	Local effect	1–3 mm/yr
Sediment compaction
Sediment compression into denser matrix (particularly significant in and near river deltas)	Local effect	
Loss of interstitial fluids (withdrawal of groundwater or oil)	Local effect	≤ 55 mm/yr
Earthquake-induced vibration	Local effect	
Departure from geoid
Shifts in hydrosphere, aesthenosphere, core-mantle interface	Local effect	
Shifts in Earth's rotation, axis of spin and precession of equinox	Eustatic	
External gravitational changes	Eustatic	
Evaporation and precipitation (if due to a long-term pattern)	Local effect	

=== Changes through geologic time ===
Sea level has changed over geologic time. The lowest level occurred at the Permian-Triassic boundary about 250 million years ago.

During the most recent ice age (at its maximum about 20,000 years ago) the world's sea level was about 130 m lower than today, due to the large amount of sea water that had evaporated and been deposited as snow and ice, mostly in the Laurentide Ice Sheet. Most of this had melted by about 10,000 years ago.

Hundreds of similar glacial cycles have occurred throughout the Earth's history. Geologists who study the positions of coastal sediment deposits through time have noted dozens of similar basinward shifts of shorelines associated with a later recovery. This results in sedimentary cycles which in some cases can be correlated around the world with great confidence. This relatively new branch of geological science linking eustatic sea level to sedimentary deposits is called sequence stratigraphy.

The most up-to-date chronology of sea level change through the Phanerozoic shows the following long-term trends:

- Gradually rising sea level through the Cambrian
- Relatively stable sea level in the Ordovician, with a large drop associated with the end-Ordovician glaciation
- Relative stability at the lower level during the Silurian
- A gradual fall through the Devonian, continuing through the Mississippian to long-term low at the Mississippian/Pennsylvanian boundary
- A gradual rise until the start of the Permian, followed by a gentle decrease lasting until the Mesozoic.

==== Sea level rise since the last glacial maximum ====
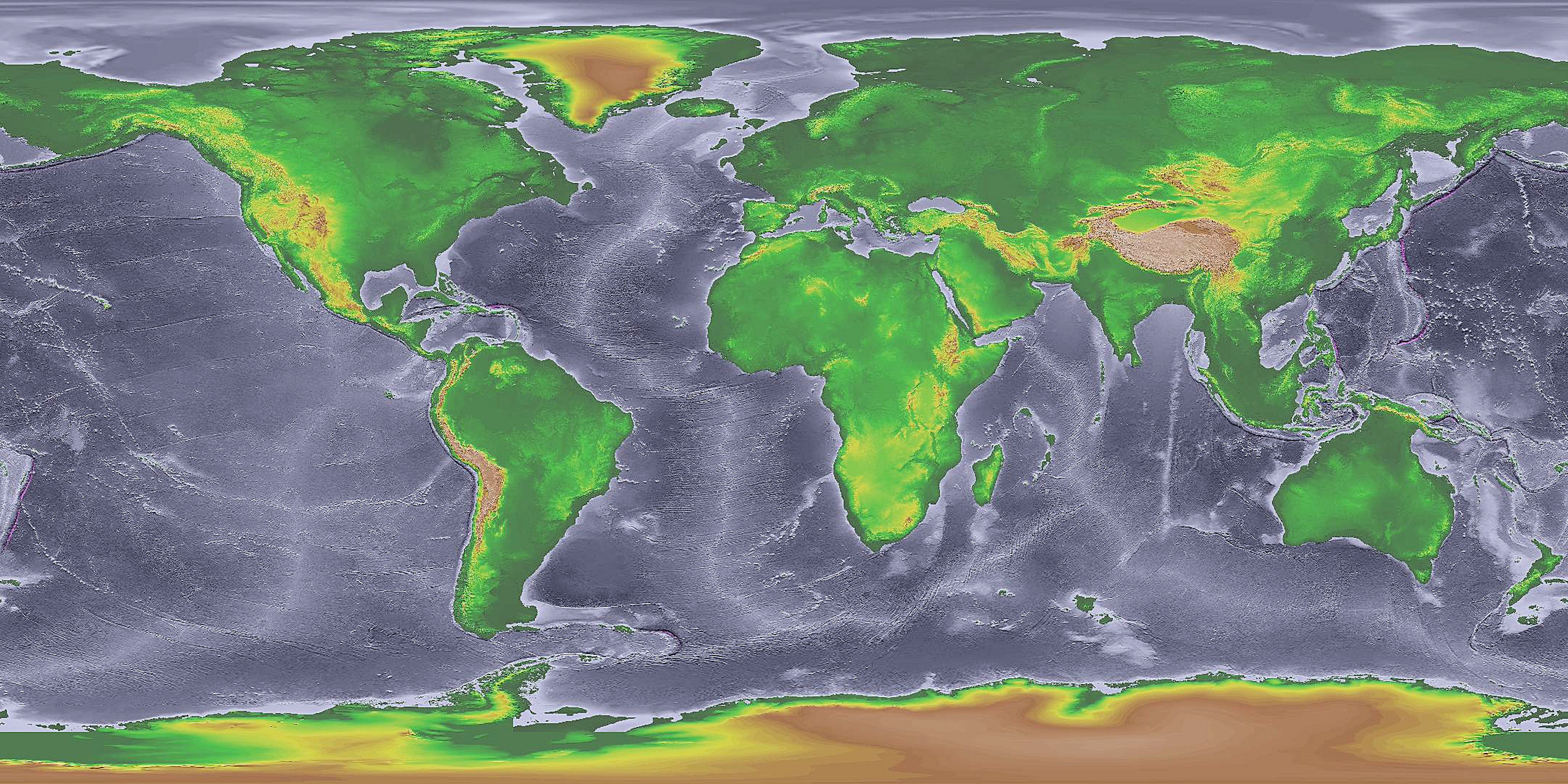
Global sea level during the Last Glacial Period

During deglaciation between about 19–8 ka, sea level rose at extremely high rates as the result of the rapid melting of the British-Irish Sea, Fennoscandian, Laurentide, Barents-Kara, Patagonian, Innuitian ice sheets and parts of the Antarctic ice sheet. At the onset of deglaciation about 19,000 years ago, a brief, at most 500-year long, glacio-eustatic event may have contributed as much as 10 m to sea level with an average rate of about 20 mm/yr. During the rest of the early Holocene, the rate of sea level rise varied from a low of about 6.0–9.9 mm/yr to as high as 30–60 mm/yr during brief periods of accelerated sea level rise.

Solid geological evidence, based largely upon analysis of deep cores of coral reefs, exists only for 3 major periods of accelerated sea level rise, called meltwater pulses, during the last deglaciation. They are Meltwater pulse 1A between circa 14,600 and 14,300 years ago; Meltwater pulse 1B between circa 11,400 and 11,100 years ago; and Meltwater pulse 1C between 8,200 and 7,600 years ago. Meltwater pulse 1A was a 13.5 m rise over about 290 years centered at 14,200 years ago and Meltwater pulse 1B was a 7.5 m rise over about 160 years centered at 11,000 years ago. In sharp contrast, the period between 14,300 and 11,100 years ago, which includes the Younger Dryas interval, was an interval of reduced sea level rise at about 6.0–9.9 mm/yr. Meltwater pulse 1C was centered at 8,000 years ago and produced a rise of 6.5 m in less than 140 years, such that sea levels 5000 years ago were around 3m lower than present day, as evidenced in many locations by fossil beaches. Such rapid rates of sea level rising during meltwater events clearly implicate major ice-loss events related to ice sheet collapse. The primary source may have been meltwater from the Antarctic ice sheet. Other studies suggest a Northern Hemisphere source for the meltwater in the Laurentide Ice Sheet.

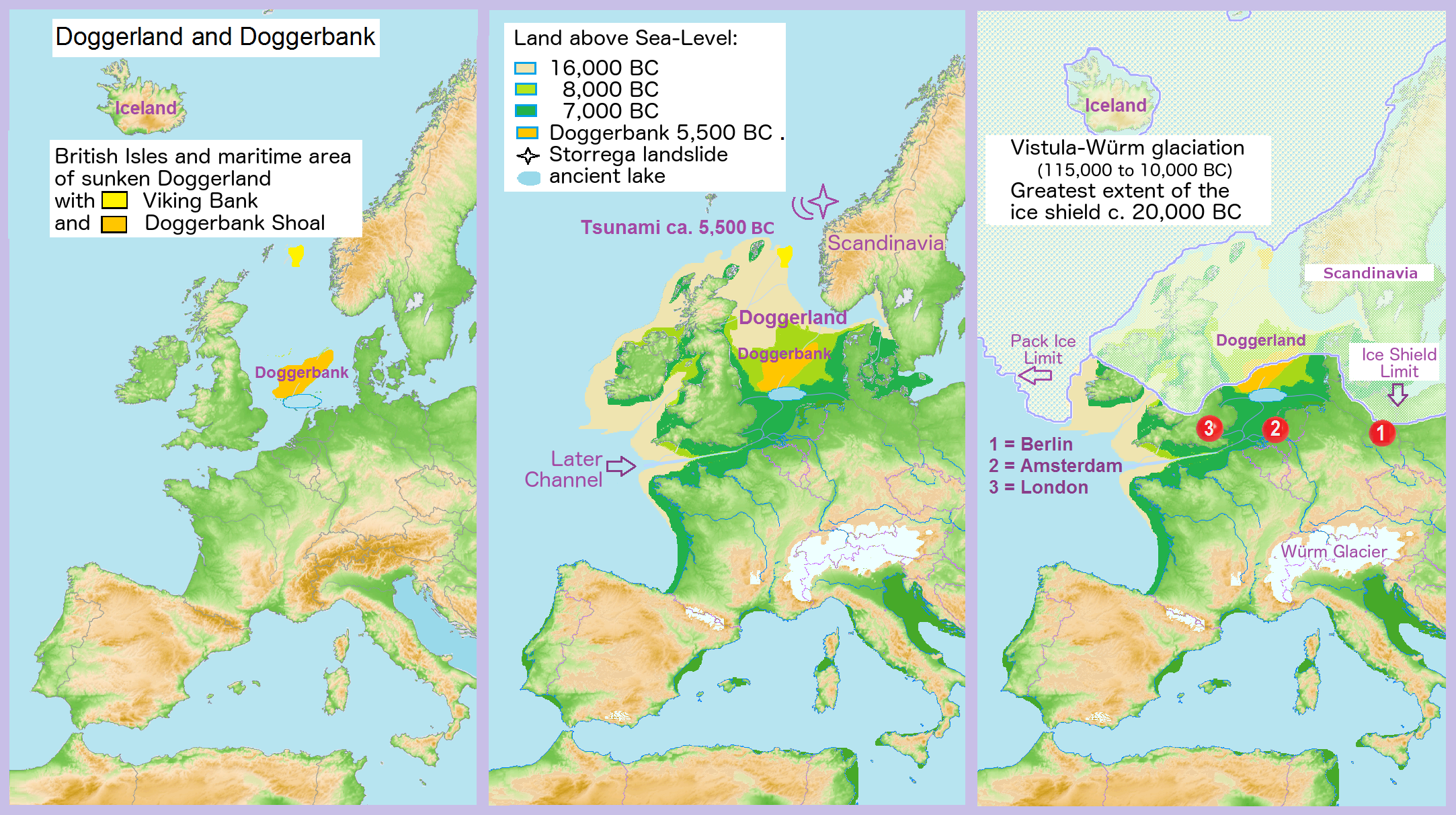
A map showing the hypothetical extent of Doggerland from now back to the Weichselian glaciation

Recently, it has become widely accepted that late Holocene, 3,000 calendar years ago to present, sea level was nearly stable prior to an acceleration of the rate of rise that is variously dated between 1850 and 1900 AD. Late Holocene rates of sea level rise have been estimated using evidence from archaeological sites and late Holocene tidal marsh sediments, combined with tide gauge and satellite records and geophysical modelling. For example, this research included studies of Roman wells in Caesarea and of Roman piscinae in Italy. These methods in combination suggest a mean eustatic component of 0.07 mm/yr for the last 2000 years. Research also indicates that between 1,500 BC and 200 BC the sea level was around 2.5 meters below current levels and rose rapidly to present levels between 200 BC and 200 AD.

Since 1880, the ocean began to rise briskly, climbing a total of 210 mm (8.3 in) through 2009 causing extensive erosion worldwide and costing billions.

Sea level rose by 6 cm during the 19th century and 19 cm in the 20th century. Evidence for this includes geological observations, the longest instrumental records and the observed rate of 20th century sea level rise. For example, geological observations indicate that during the last 2,000 years, sea level change was small, with an average rate of only 0.0–0.2 mm per year. This compares to an average rate of 1.7 ± 0.5 mm per year for the 20th century. Baart et al. (2012) show that it is important to account for the effect of the 18.6-year lunar nodal cycle before acceleration in sea level rise should be concluded. Based on tide gauge data, the rate of global average sea level rise during the 20th century lies in the range 0.8 to 3.3 mm/yr, with an average rate of 1.8 mm/yr.

== Bibliography ==
- IPCC AR4 WG1 (2007). "AR4 Climate Change 2007: The Physical Science Basis".
- IPCC TAR WG1 (2001). "TAR Climate Change 2001: The Scientific Basis".
