= Early Holocene sea level rise =

Sea level rise between 12,000 and 7,000 years ago

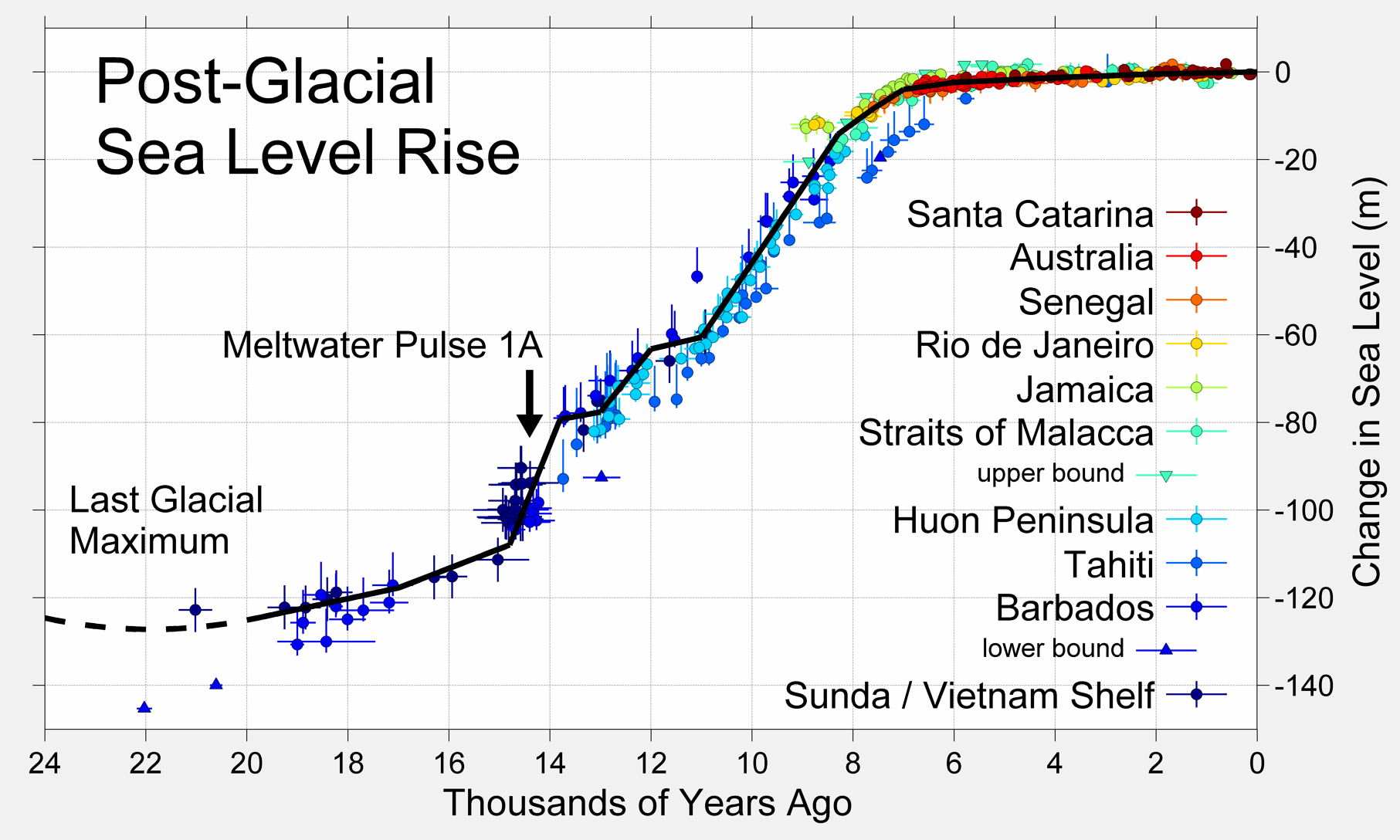
Sea level change since the Last Glacial Maximum.

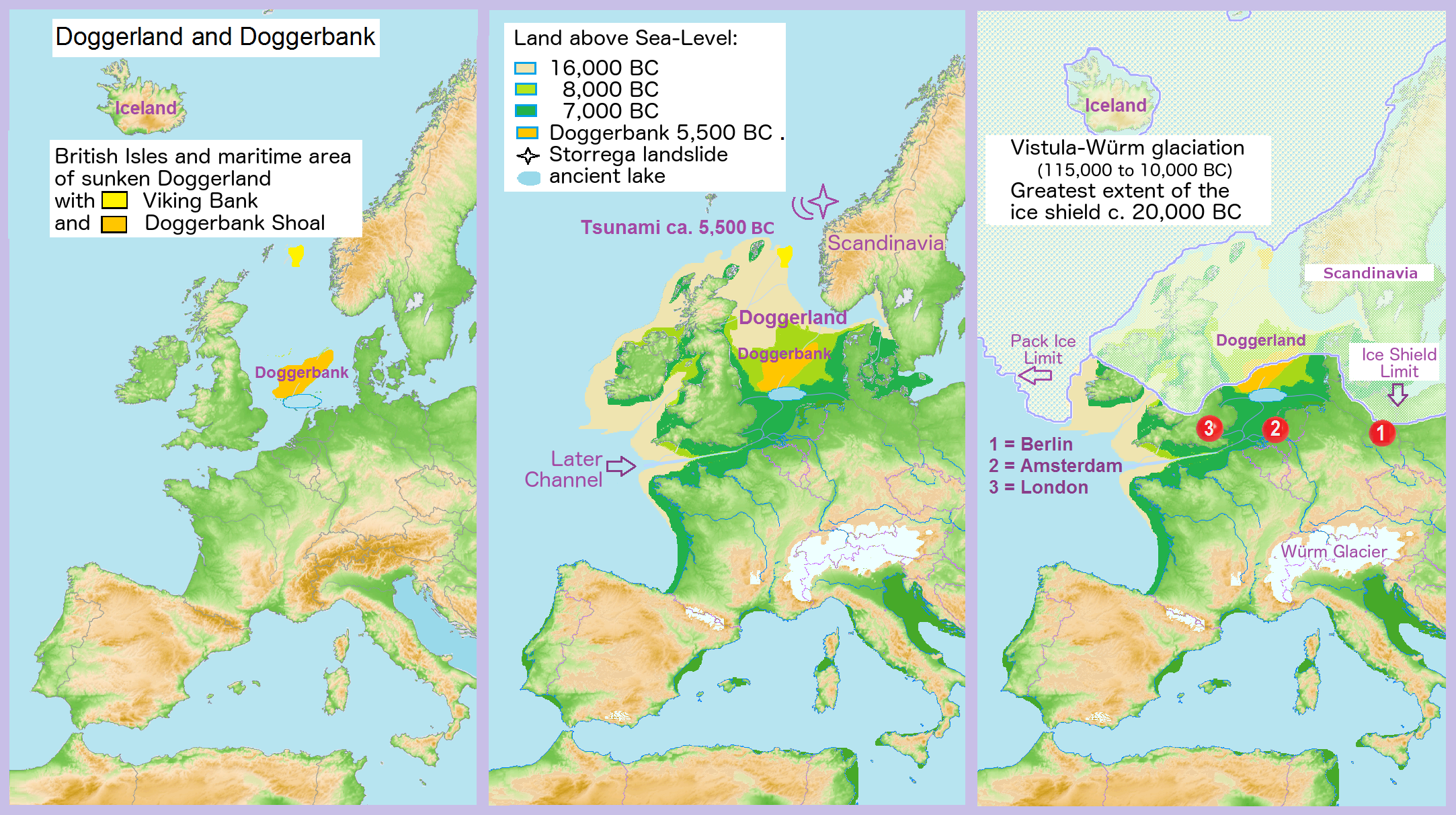
European coastline: modern (left), during the early Holocene (center) and during the Last Glacial Maximum (right).

The early Holocene sea level rise (EHSLR) was a significant jump in sea level by about 60 m (197 ft) during the early Holocene, between about 12,000 and 7,000 years ago, spanning the Eurasian Mesolithic. The rapid rise in sea level and associated climate change, notably the 8.2 ka cooling event (8,200 years ago), and the loss of coastal land favoured by early farmers, may have contributed to the spread of the Neolithic Revolution to Europe in its Neolithic period.

During deglaciation since the Last Glacial Maximum, between about 20,000 to 7,000 years ago (20–7 ka), the sea level rose by a total of about 100 m (328 ft), at times at extremely high rates, due to the rapid melting of the British-Irish Sea, Fennoscandian, Laurentide, Barents-Kara, Patagonian, Innuitian and parts of the Antarctic ice sheets. At the onset of deglaciation about 19,000 years ago, a brief, at most 500-year long, glacio-eustatic event may have contributed as much as 10 m (33 ft) to sea level with an average rate of about 20 mm (0.8 in)/yr. During the rest of the early Holocene, the rate of sea level rise varied from a low of about 6.0–9.9 mm (0.2–0.4 in)/yr to as high as 30–60 mm (1.2–2.4 in)/yr during brief periods of accelerated sea level rise.

Solid geological evidence, based largely upon analysis of deep cores of coral reefs, exists only for three major periods of accelerated sea level rise, called meltwater pulses, during the last deglaciation. The first, Meltwater pulse 1A, lasted between c. 14.6–14.3 ka and was a 13.5 m (44 ft) rise over about 290 years centered at 14.2 ka.

The EHSLR spans Meltwater pulses 1B and 1C, between 12,000 and 7,000 years ago:

- Meltwater pulse 1B between c. 11.4–11.1 ka, a 7.5 m (25 ft) rise over about 160 years centered at 11.1 ka, which includes the end of Younger Dryas interval of reduced sea level rise at about 6.0–9.9 mm (0.2–0.4 in)/yr;
- Meltwater pulse 1C between c. 8.2–7.6 ka, centered at 8.0 ka, a rise of 6.5 m (21 ft) in less than 140 years.

Such rapid rates of sea level rising during meltwater events clearly implicate major ice-loss events related to ice sheet collapse. The primary source may have been meltwater from the Antarctic ice sheet. Other studies suggest a Northern Hemisphere source for the meltwater in the Laurentide Ice Sheet.

There is a hypothesis that the EHSLR left some traces in the mythology like flood myths, and oral history of groups such as Aboriginal peoples of Australia.

== See also ==
- Last Glacial Maximum – Circa 24,000–16,000 BCE; most recent era when ice sheets were at their greatest extent
- Next Glacial Maximum – Series of alternating glacial and interglacial periods
- Past sea level – Sea level variations over geological time scales
- Holocene glacial retreat – Period of global deglaciation
- Holocene climatic optimum – Global warm period around 9,000–5,000 years ago
- 8.2-kiloyear event – Rapid global cooling about 8,200 years ago
- Younger Dryas – Time period c. 12,900–11,700 years ago
- Doggerland – Former landmass in Northern Europe
- Pre-Pottery Neolithic A – Middle Eastern Neolithic culture
- Pre-Pottery Neolithic B – Neolithic culture in upper Mesopotamia and the Levant c. 8800–6500 BC
