= Postglacial vegetation =

Postglacial vegetation refers to plants that colonize the newly exposed substrate after a glacial retreat. The term "postglacial" typically refers to processes and events that occur after the departure of glacial ice or glacial climates.

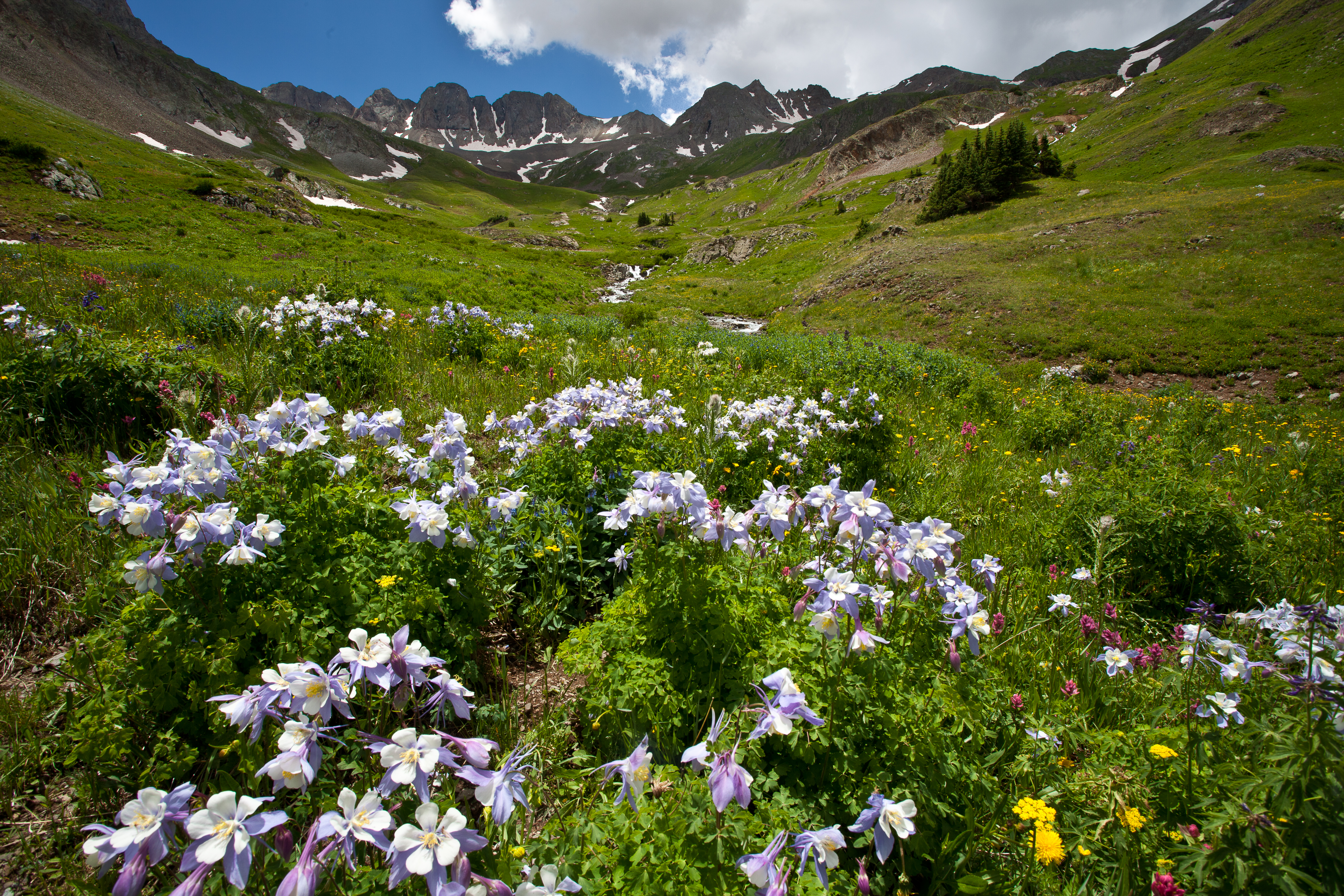
Handies Peak WSA (9466436592)

== Climate Influence ==
Climate change is the main force behind changes in species distribution and abundance. Repeated changes in climate throughout the Quaternary Period are thought to have had a significant impact on the current vegetation species diversity present today. Functional and phylogenetic diversity are considered to be closely related to changing climatic conditions and this indicates that trait differences are extremely important in long term responses to climate change. During the transition from the last glaciation of the Pleistocene to the Holocene period, climate warming resulted in the expansion of taller plants and larger seed bearing plants which resulted in lower proportions of vegetation regeneration. Hence, low temperatures can be strong environmental filters that prevent tall and large-seeded plants from establishing in postglacial environments. Throughout Europe vegetation dynamics within the first half of the Holocene appear to have been influenced mainly by climate and the reorganization of atmospheric circulation associated with the disappearance of the North American ice sheet. This is evident in the rapid increase of forestation and changing biomes during the postglacial period between 11500ka and 8000ka before the present. Vegetation development periods of post-glacial land forms on Ellesmere Island, Northern Canada, is assumed to have been at least ca. 20,000 years in duration. This slow progression is mostly due to climatic restrictions such as an estimated annual rainfall amount of only 64mm and a mean annual temperature of -19.7 degrees Celsius. The length in time of vegetation development observed on Ellesmere Island is evidence that post glacial vegetation development is much more restricted in the Arctic and colder climates as compared to milder climatic regions such as the boreal, temperate and tropical zones.

== Vegetation Responses ==
As land became exposed following the glaciation of the last ice age, a variety of geographic settings ranging from the tropics to the Arctic and Antarctic became available for the establishment of vegetation. Species that now exist on formerly glaciated terrain must have undergone a change in distribution of hundreds to thousands of kilometers, or have evolved from others taxa that have once done so in the past. In a newly developing environment, plant growth is often strongly influenced by the introduction of new organisms into that environment, where competitive or mutualistic relationships may develop. Often, competitive balances are eventually reached and species abundances remain somewhat constant over a period of generations. Studies done on the Norwegian Island of Svalbard, have been very useful in understanding the behavior of postglacial vegetation. Studies show that many vascular plants that are considered pioneers of vegetation development, eventually become less frequent. For example, the abundance of species such as Braya purpurascens has fallen nearly 30% due to the introduction of new species in the area.

== Postglacial Vegetation in North America ==
Arctic vegetation has distinct postglacial development characteristics compared to the more temperate zones of lower latitudes. A study of postglacial moraines conducted in the Canadian Arctic on Ellesmere Island have found that dwarf shrubs of Dryas integrifolia and Cassiope tetragona are often good indicators of vegetation development and progression. Dwarf shrubs have been found to increase with the age of the moraine, with Dryas integrifolia becoming the most predominant. As well the cover of vegetation, including lichens and bryophytes showed consistent increase with the moraine age, suggesting directional vegetation development. It is also suggested that part of the high proportions of polypoids occurring in arctic floras is the result of speciation as continental ice-sheets withdrew. Pollen diagrams from northern Quebec, Canada, show advances throughout the Holocene of post-glacial vegetation development. The initial phase of open vegetation began about 6000 years before the present. Following deglaciation, shrub and herbaceous tundra plants dominated for a brief period of time. Plants such as the Larix laricina, Populus and Juniperus, were also important in the initial vegetation development. Some species that followed later include: Alnus crispa, and Betula. Though later vegetation development was mainly dominated by Picea, shortly following deglaciation, they reached their present day limit. Today black spruce is mainly dominant throughout much of northern Quebec. The continental U.S. is considered to have strongly contributed to the re-establishment of postglacial vegetation in Canada following the last ice age. Roughly 300 taxa of vascular plants and mosses that were found to have existed below the extent of the last glacial period within the United States were also found to have migrated to Canada. These patterns are recorded within either pollen or macro fossils.

== Anthropogenic Impact ==
Studies done by Reitalu, (2015) have found that human impact throughout much of Europe has negatively influenced plant diversity by suppressing the establishment of tall-growing, large seeded taxa. Although human influence has facilitated many ruderal species, this is believed to have led to an overall decrease in phylogenetic diversity.

== Research Methods ==
Many pollen diagrams around the world indicate that major climate changes caused the last continental ice sheets to retreat, leading to dramatic effects on the distribution and abundance of plants. By converting pollen data into plant functional type (PFT) assemblages and interpolating the data, researchers have been able to reconstruct postglacial vegetation patterns around the world. Core sampling and analysis of lake sediments that contain pollen and other plant remains are often used to obtain good records of past pollination cycles. Such paleorecords preserved in lake sediments can be used to reconstruct the history of post glacial vegetation. Lake sediments have an advantage over other core sampling sites, such as fen and bog peats, as they provide no overwhelming local pollen components. As well, lake sediments contain stratigraphic changes in soil character, which are useful for understanding changes in vegetation development over a period of time. Macrofossils that are obtained from sedimentary deposits are also useful for constructing the history of changing postglacial vegetation.
