= Meltwater pulse 1A =

Period of rapid post-glacial sea level rise

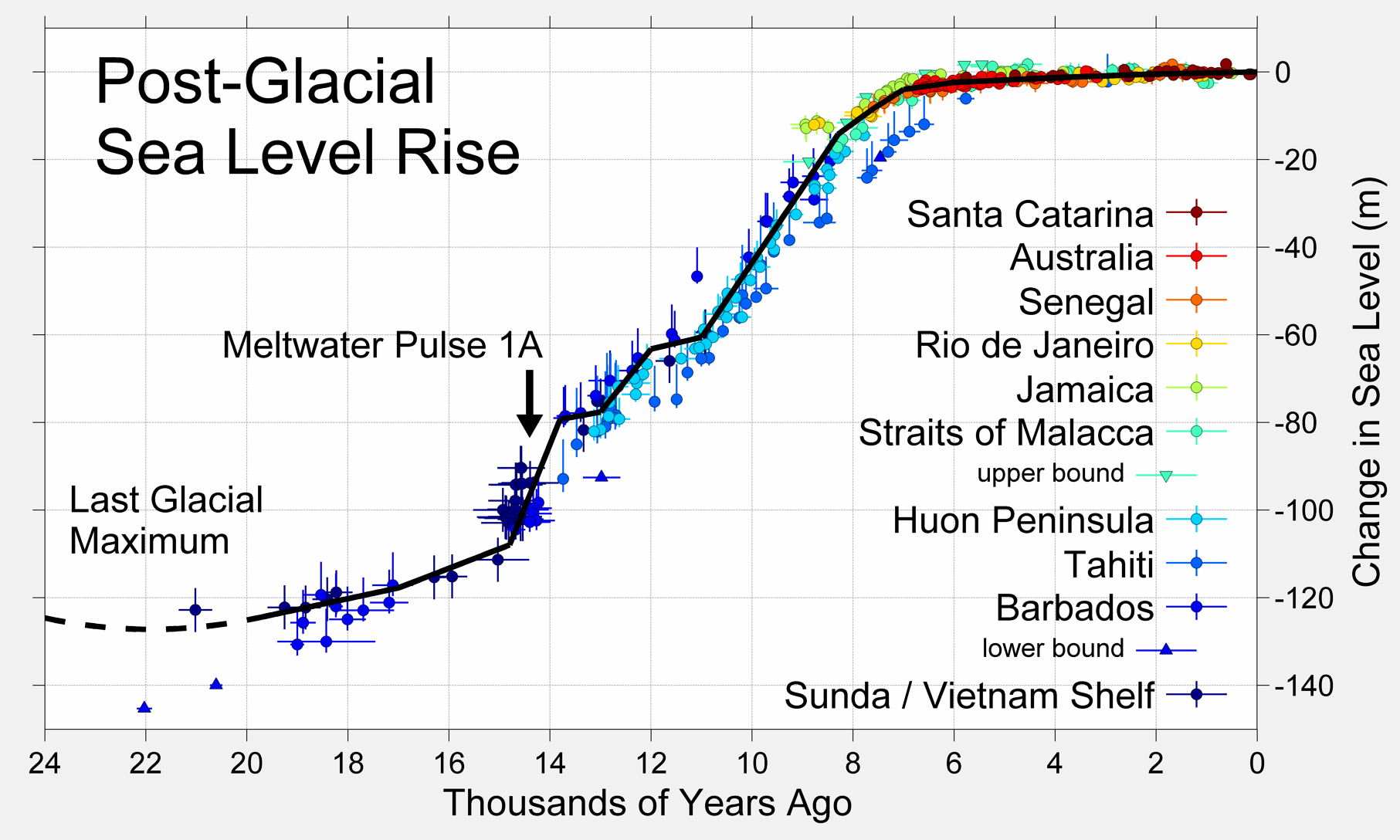
Image showing sea level change during the end of the last glacial period. Meltwater pulse 1A is indicated.

Meltwater pulse 1A (MWP1a) is the name used by geologists, paleoclimatologists, and oceanographers for a Quaternary period of rapid post-glacial sea level rise between 14,700 and 13,500 years ago, during which the global sea level rose between 16 meters (52 ft) and 25 meters (82 ft) in about 400–500 years, giving mean rates of roughly 30–60 mm (1.2–2.4 in)/yr. MWP1a is also known as catastrophic rise event 1 (CRE1) in the Caribbean Sea.

The rates of sea level rise associated with MWP1a are the highest known rates of post-glacial, eustatic sea level rise. Meltwater pulse 1A is the most widely recognized and least disputed of the named post-glacial meltwater pulses. Other named post-glacial meltwater pulses are known most commonly as meltwater pulse 1A0 (meltwater pulse 19ka), meltwater pulse 1B, meltwater pulse 1C, meltwater pulse 1D, and meltwater pulse 2. MWP1a and other periods of rapid sea level rise are known as meltwater pulses because the inferred cause of them was the rapid release of meltwater into the oceans from the collapse of continental ice sheets.

== Sea level and timing ==
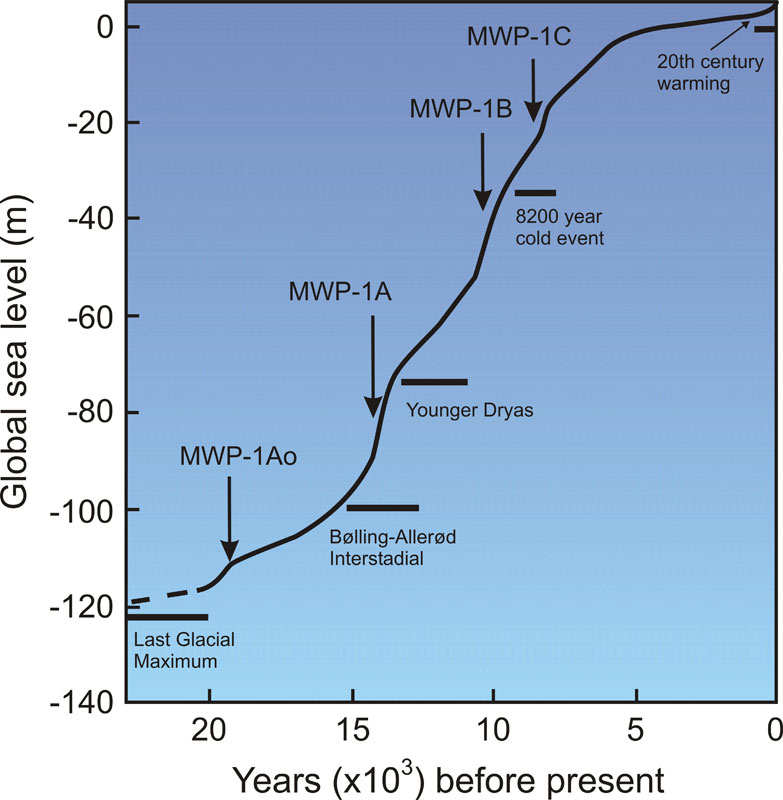
Postglacial Sea level Rise Curve and Meltwater Pulses (MWP)

MWP1a occurred in a period of rising sea level and rapid climate change at the end of the Last Glacial Period, known as Termination I. Several researchers have narrowed the period of the pulse to between 14,300 and 14,650 years ago. The start of this meltwater event coincides with or closely follows the abrupt onset of the Bølling–Allerød (B-A) interstadial and warming in the NorthGRIP ice core in Greenland at 14,600 years ago. During MWP1a, sea level is estimated to have risen at a rate of 40–60 mm (0.13–0.20 ft)/yr. This rate of sea level rise was much larger than the rate of current sea level rise, which has been estimated to be in the region of 2–3 mm (0.0066–0.0098 ft)/yr.

== Sources ==
The source of meltwaters for MWP1a and the path they took remains a matter of continuing controversy. The debate is centered around whether the predominant additions to the sea level rise came from the Antarctic ice sheet, the Laurentide ice sheet, or the Fennoscandian and Barents Sea ice sheets.

=== Antarctic ice sheet ===
The technique of sea-level fingerprinting has been used to argue that major contribution to this meltwater pulse came from Antarctica. The magnitude of eustatic sea level rise during MWP1a is a significant indicator of its sources. If the eustatic sea level rise was large and closer to 20 meters (66 ft) than the lower estimates, a significant fraction of the meltwater that caused it likely came from the Antarctic ice sheet. A contribution of around 2 meters (6.6 ft) in 350 years from the Antarctic ice sheet could have been caused by Southern Ocean warming.

With respect to the Antarctic ice sheet, research by Weber and others constructed a well-dated, high-resolution record of the discharge of icebergs from various parts of the Antarctic ice sheet for the past 20,000 years. They constructed this record from variations in the amount of iceberg-rafted debris versus time and other environmental proxies in two cores taken from the ocean bottom within Iceberg Alley of the Weddell Sea. The sediments within Iceberg Alley provide a spatially integrated signal of the variability of the discharge of icebergs into the marine waters by the ice sheet because it is a confluence zone in which icebergs calved from the entire ice sheet drift along currents, converge, and exit the Weddell Sea to the north into the Scotia Sea.

The study documents eight well-defined periods of increased iceberg ice calving and discharge from various parts of the ice sheet that occurred between 20,000 and 9,000 years before present (YBP). The highest period of discharge of icebergs is known as AID6 (Antarctic Iceberg Discharge event 6). AID6 has a relatively abrupt onset at about 15,000 YBP. The peak interval of greatest iceberg discharge and flux from the Antarctic ice sheet for AID6 is between 14,800 and 14,400 YBP. The peak discharge was followed by gradual decline in flux until 13,900 YBP, when it abruptly ended. The peak period of iceberg discharge for AID6 is synchronous with the onset of the B-A interstadial in the Northern Hemisphere MWP1a. Weber and others estimate that the flux of icebergs from Antarctica during AID6 contributed a substantial amount of water (at least 50%) to the global mean sea-level rise that occurred during MWP1a. These icebergs came from the widespread retreat of the Antarctic ice sheet, including from the Mac. Robertson Land region of the East Antarctic Ice Sheet; the Ross Sea sector of the West Antarctic Ice Sheet; and the Antarctic Peninsula Ice Sheet.

=== Laurentide ice sheet ===
Studies have argued for the Laurentide ice sheet in North America being the dominant source of this meltwater pulse. As mentioned previously, the source of the contribution to the meltwater pulse can be deduced from the magnitude of sea level rise; a eustatic sea level rise around 10 meters (33 ft) could plausibly be solely explained by a North American source. Ice sheet modelling work suggests that the abrupt onset of the B-A interstadial may have triggered the separation of the Cordilleran ice sheet and Laurentide ice sheet (and the opening of the ice-free corridor) producing a major contribution to MWP1a.

==== Mississippi River ====
In the case of the Mississippi River, the sediments of the Louisiana continental shelf and slope, including the Orca Basin, within the Gulf of Mexico preserve a variety of paleoclimate and paleohydrologic proxies. They have been used to reconstruct both the duration and discharge of Mississippi River meltwater events and superfloods for the Late glacial and postglacial periods, including the time of MWP1a. The chronology of flooding events found by the study of numerous cores on the Louisiana continental shelf and slope are in agreement that the timing of meltwater pulses. For example, MWP1a in the Barbados coral record matches quite well with a group of two Mississippi River meltwater flood events, MWF-3 (12,600 YBP); and MWF-4 (11,900 YBP). In addition, meltwater pulse 1B in the Barbados coral record matches a cluster of four Mississippi River superflood events, MWF-5, that occurred between 9,900 and 9,100 YBP. The discharge of water coursing down the Mississippi River during MWF-4 is estimated to have been 0.15 sverdrups (million cubic meters per second). This discharge is roughly equivalent to 50% of the global discharge during MWP1a. This research also shows that MWF-4 occurred during the B-A interstadial and had largely stopped before the beginning of the Younger Dryas stadial. The same research found an absence of meltwater floods discharging into the Gulf of Mexico from the Mississippi River for a period of time following MWF-4, known as the cessation event, that corresponds with the Younger Dryas stadial.

Prior to MWF-3, two other Mississippi River meltwater floods, MWF-2 and MWF-1, have been recognized. MWF-1 consists of three separate but closely spaced events that occurred between 16,000 and 14,000 YBP. Each of these flood events had a discharge of about 0.08 to 0.09 sverdrups. Collectively, they appear to be associated with MWP1a0. MWF-2, one of the largest of the Mississippi River meltwater floods, occurred between 13,600 and 13,200 YBP. During its 400 radiocarbon year duration, the maximum discharge MWF-2 is estimated to have been between 0.15 and 0.19 sverdrups. Despite the large size of MWF-2, it is not known to be associated with an identifiable meltwater pulse.

=== Fennoscandian ice sheet ===
Although the Fennoscandian ice sheet has previously been considered an insignificant, negligible contributor to MWP1a, some research suggests it may have contributed to around half of the sea level rise. An ice volume of 4.5–7.9 meters (15–26 ft) of sea level equivalent was lost over half a millennium during the transition into the B-A interstadial, with around 3.3–6.7 meters (11–22 ft) being lost from the ice sheet during the peak warming. Another study estimated 4.6 meters (15 ft) of sea level rise came from the melting of the Fennoscandian ice sheet.

== See also ==
- Deglaciation
