= Holocene glacial retreat =

Period of global deglaciation

The Holocene glacial retreat is a geographical phenomenon that involved the global retreat of glaciers (deglaciation) that previously had advanced during the Last Glacial Maximum. Ice sheet retreat began around 19,000 years ago and accelerated around 15,000 years ago. The Holocene, starting with abrupt warming around 9700 BC, resulted in rapid melting of the remaining ice sheets in North America and Europe.

== Geographical alterations ==
=== Antarctica ===
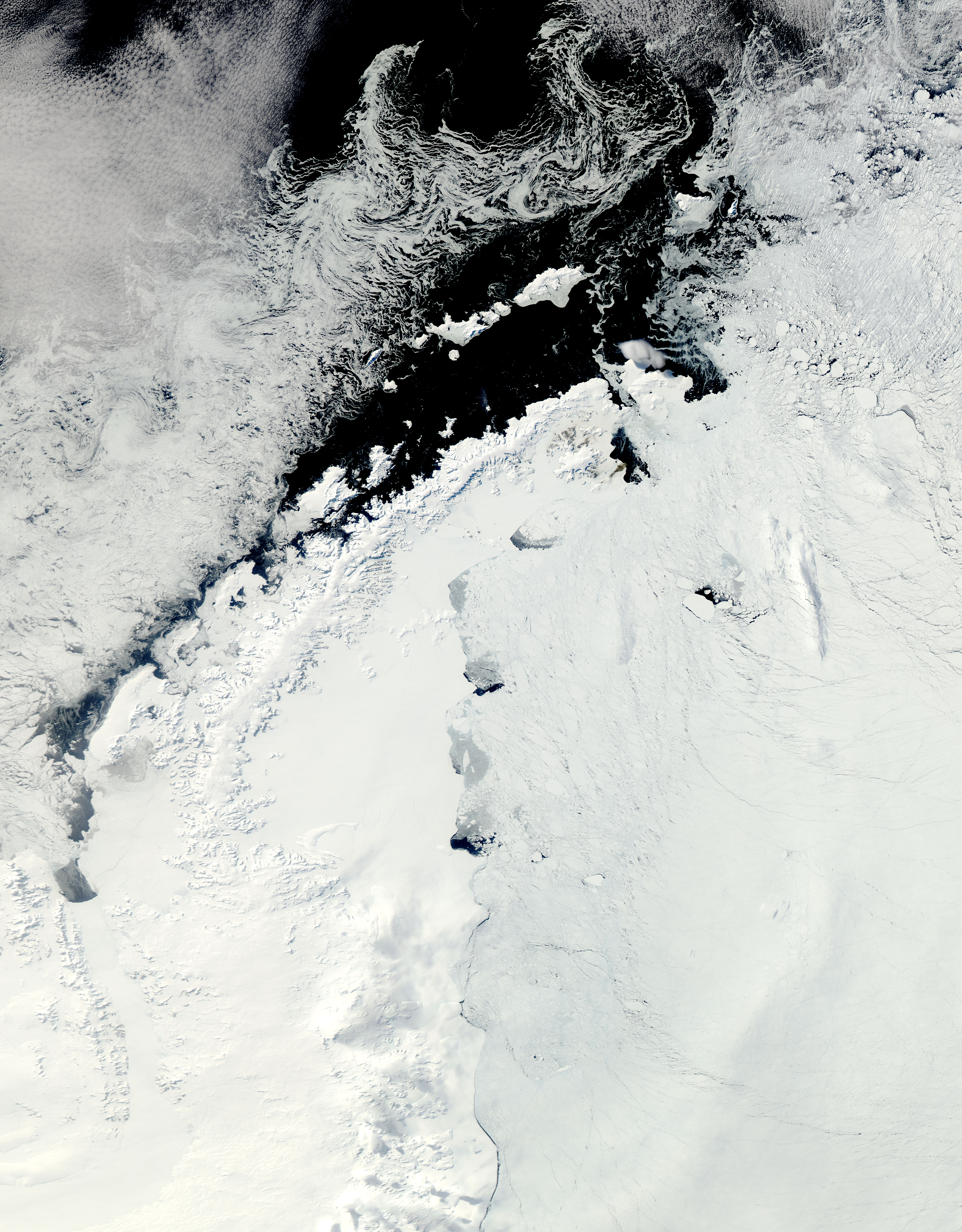
Fragments of Larsen B ice shelf lingered until 2005

Radiocarbon dating has been used to date the start of glacial retreat on Alexander Island around 18,000 years ago. The outermost locations like Marguerite Bay were fully deglaciated around 10,000 BC and the further inland locations continued deglaciating for an additional 3,000 years. The Larsen ice shelf was formed in the early Holocene at the latest estimation of 8700 BC. Certain segments of the ice shelf have collapsed as recently as 1995 for Larsen A and a large segment of Larsen B collapsed in 2002.

=== Europe ===
The many valleys of the Cairngorms, a mountainous region in the Eastern Scottish Highlands are littered with deposits from this period.

In northwestern Iceland, the Icelandic ice sheet began its non-uniform retreat around 15,000 years ago. Surface exposure dating using the isotope ^{36}Cl was the primary means of dating boulders and terminal moraines in the Drangajökull area in Iceland. Ages of erratic boulders found near the Leirufjörður valley and moraine range from 7-12 thousand years old. The average age for the groupings of boulders in the Leirufjörður area is 9,300 years. Directly south of Leirufjörður in the Kaldalon Valley, the average age of the boulders is 15,000 years. The two different average ages are a result of different rates of glacial activity in Iceland.

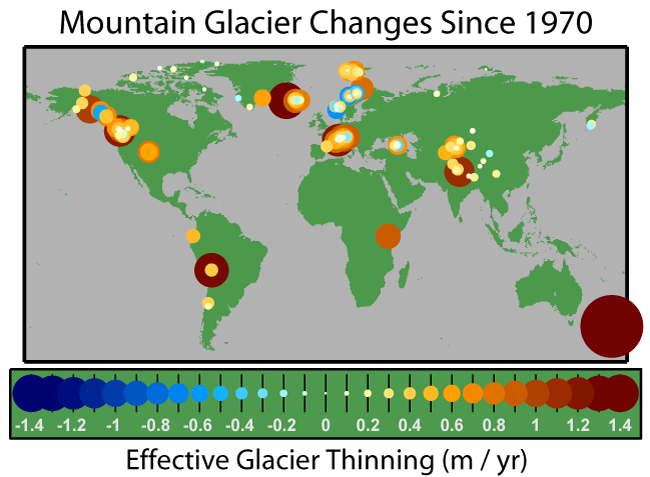
Modern glacial activity. Antarctica is not pictured.

Another area that has experienced deglaciation during the Holocene is Spitsbergen Island within the Svalbard archipelago in Norway. For the last 12,000 years, exposed rockwalls have been eroding due to a mixture of biogenic flaking, frost shattering, and stress relaxation that results when glaciers retreat. One way the rate of rockwall retreat is measured is by examining the diameters of local lichen to establish an age of growth.

=== North America ===
The retreat of the Laurentide Ice Sheet in Canada led to the formation of moraines and up to 26 proglacial lakes scattered throughout central Canada. The deglaciation occurred from the last glacial maximum (21,000 years ago) to 7,000 years ago. Some of the lakes in the southern Ungava Bay area were fully deglaciated around 4000 BC. Meltwater from the glacial prehistoric Lake Agassiz contributed to the neoglaciation during the Holocene, which resulted in an uptick of glacial activity at least as far away as Iceland.

The Nuup Kangerlua and Sermilik regions, in southwestern and southeastern Greenland respectively, are two localities that experienced deglaciation after the Holocene warming period started. Warming atmospheric temperatures as well as warming waters in the Labrador Sea accelerated the speed of deglaciation which started on the coasts of Greenland before heading inland. Moraines located in the interior of the Nuup Kangerlua area have been dated 8.1 to 8.3 thousand years ago; they mark a local cooling that caused glaciers to re-advance and leave them behind.

The Ohio River was formed when the river was temporarily dammed just southwest of Louisville, Kentucky, creating a large lake until the dam burst. The Ohio River largely supplanted the former Teays River drainage system, which was disrupted by the glaciers.

Lake Chicago, on the southern margin of the Wisconsin Glacier, found successive lower outlets as the glacier retreated until the Saint Lawrence River route was uncovered. Corresponding to each level, remnant lake shore features may be found in many areas. One prehistoric shoreline is delineated by Bluff Avenue, a north-south street on the La Grange, Illinois east side.

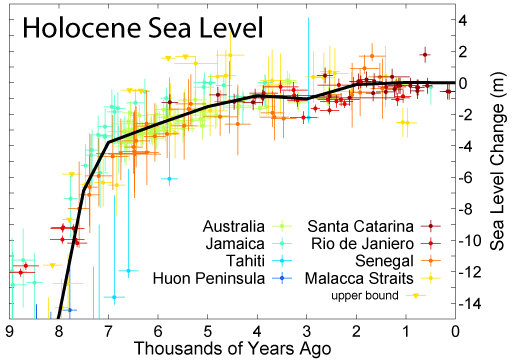
Changes in sea level during the Holocene

Current river delta positioning and sediment composition in northern Michigan were created by a glacial lake. The lake resulted from retreating glaciers.

=== South America ===
The Northern Patagonian Icefield is one location that experienced a glacial activity surge during the neoglaciation period. Terminal moraines formed around 3700 BC in the San Rafael Glacier, and around 4,960 years ago, they formed in the nearby Colonia Glacier. In the Southern Patagonian Icefield located in Argentina and Chile, some glaciers have actually been advancing to their peak extents as recently as the 19th century as evidenced by moraines. Another remnant of glacial activity in the southern Patagonian icefield is the creation of meltwater channels within the El Canal spillway found near the Lago del Toro in Chile. The different layers of stratification have been used to date different occurrences of glacial lakes in the region.

=== New Zealand ===
Within the last 30 years, while most locations have experienced continued glacial retreat, glaciers in the Southern Alps of New Zealand have advanced. Glaciers located near coasts, such as in New Zealand, are particularly responsive to climate change and serve as an indicator of local climate change. The anticipated warming waters near New Zealand in the Tasman Sea will lead to a reduction in glacial mass balance.

Eight records of local temperature variability on multi-centennial scales throughout the course of the Holocene, and an average of these (thick dark line).

== See also ==
- Deglaciation – Transition from full glacial conditions during ice ages to warm interglacial conditions
- Postglacial vegetation
- Meltwater pulse 1B – Period of either rapid or just accelerated post-glacial sea level rise
- Early Holocene sea level rise – Sea level rise between 12,000 and 7,000 years ago
