= Meltwater pulse 1B =

Period of either rapid or just accelerated post-glacial sea level rise

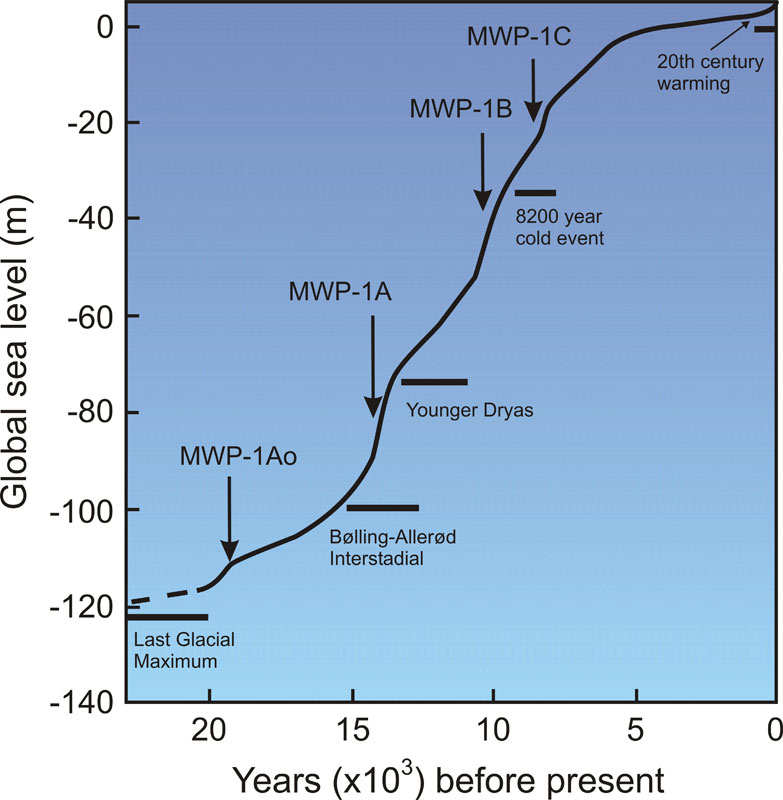
Postglacial Sea level Rise Curve and Meltwater Pulses (MWP)

Meltwater pulse 1B (MWP1b) is the name used by Quaternary geologists, paleoclimatologists, and oceanographers for a period of either rapid or just accelerated post-glacial sea level rise that some hypothesize to have occurred between 11,500 and 11,200 years ago at the beginning of the Holocene and after the end of the Younger Dryas. Meltwater pulse 1B is also known as catastrophic rise event 2 (CRE2) in the Caribbean Sea.

Other named, postglacial meltwater pulses are known most commonly as meltwater pulse 1A0 (meltwater pulse19ka), meltwater pulse 1A, meltwater pulse 1C, meltwater pulse 1D, and meltwater pulse 2. It and these other periods of proposed rapid sea level rise are known as meltwater pulses because the inferred cause of them was the rapid release of meltwater into the oceans from the collapse of continental ice sheets.

== Sea level ==
There is considerable unresolved disagreement over the significance, timing, magnitude, and even existence of meltwater pulse 1B. It was first recognized by Richard G. Fairbanks in his coral reef studies in Barbados. From the analysis of data from cores of coral reefs surrounding Barbados, he concluded that during meltwater pulse 1B, sea level rose 28 meters (92 ft) in about 500 years about 11,300 years ago.

However, in 1996 and 2010, Bard and others published detailed analysis of data from cores from coral reefs surrounding Tahiti. They concluded that meltwater pulse 1B was, at best, just an acceleration of sea level rise at about 11,300 years ago and it was, at worst, not statistically different from a constant rate sea level rise between 11,500 and 10,200 years ago. They argued that meltwater pulse 1B was certainly not an abrupt jump in sea level, which they would consider to be a meltwater pulse. They argue that the 28-meter (92 ft) rise in sea level estimated by Fairbanks from cores is an artifact created by differential tectonic uplift between different sides of a tectonic structure lying between the two Barbados cores used to identify meltwater pulse 1B and calculate its magnitude.

Other differing estimates about the magnitude of meltwater pulse 1B have been published. In 2010, Standford and others found it to be "robustly expressed" as a multi-millennial interval of enhanced rates of sea-level rise between 11,500 and 8,800 years ago with peak rates of rise of up to 25 mm/yr. In 2004, Liu and Milliman reexamined the original data from Barbados and Tahiti and reconsidered the mechanics and sedimentology of reef drowning by sea level rise. They concluded that meltwater pulse 1B occurred between 11,500 and 11,200 years ago, a 300-year interval, during which sea level rose 13 meters (43 ft) from −58 meters (−190 ft) to −45 meters (−148 ft), giving a mean annual rate of around 40mm/yr Other studies have revised the estimated magnitude of meltwater pulse 1B downward to between 7.5 meters (25 ft) and less than 6 meters (20 ft).

== Source(s) of meltwater pulse 1B ==
Given the disagreement over its timing, magnitude, and even existence, it has been very difficult to constrain the source of meltwater pulse 1B. In his modeling of global glacial isostatic adjustment, Peltier assumed that the predominant source for MWP-1B was the Antarctic Ice Sheet. However, no justification for this assumption is provided in his papers. In addition, Leventer and others argue that the timing of deglaciation in eastern Antarctica roughly coincides with the onset of meltwater pulse 1B and the Antarctic Ice Sheet is a likely source. Finally, McKay and others suggested that recession of the West Antarctic Ice Sheet may have supplied the meltwater needed to the start meltwater pulse 1B.

However, later studies involving the surface exposure dating of glacial erratics, nunataks, and other formerly glaciated exposures using cosmogenic dating contradicted the above arguments and assumptions. These studies tentatively concluded that the actual amount of thinning of the East Antarctic Ice Sheet is too small, 50 to 200 meters (160 to 660 ft), and likely too gradual and too late to have contributed any significant amount of meltwater to meltwater pulse 1B. They also concluded that the ice sheet retreat and thinning accelerated for the West Antarctic Ice Sheet only after 7,000 years ago. Although other researchers have concluded that the abrupt decay of the Laurentide Ice Sheet might have been sufficient to have been responsible for meltwater pulse 1B, its sources remain an unresolved mystery. For example, recent research in West Antarctica found that sufficient deglaciation contemporaneous with meltwater pulse 1B occurred to readily explain this rapid period of global sea level rise.

== Mississippi River superflood events MWF-5 ==
A variety of paleoclimate and paleohydrologic proxies, which can be used to reconstruct the prehistoric discharge of the Mississippi River, can be found in the sediments of the Louisiana continental shelf and slope, including the Orca and Pygmy basins, within the Gulf of Mexico. These proxies have been used by Quaternary geologists, paleoclimatologists, and oceanographers to reconstruct both the duration and discharge the mouth of the prehistoric Mississippi River for the Late glacial and postglacial periods, including the time of meltwater pulse 1B. The chronology of flooding events found by the study of cores on the Louisiana continental shelf and slope are in agreement with the timing of meltwater pulses. For example, meltwater pulse 1A in the Barbados coral record matches quite well with a group of two separate Mississippi River meltwater flood events, MWF-3 (12,600 RCYBP) and MWF-4 (11,900 RCYBP). In addition, meltwater pulse 1B in the Barbados coral record matches a cluster of four Mississippi River superflood events, MWF-5, that occurred between 9,900 and 9,100 RCYBP. In 2003, Aharon reported that flood event MWF-5 consists of four separate and distinct superfloods at 9,970-9,870; 9,740-9,660; 9,450-9,290; and 9,160-8,900 RCYBP. The discharge at the mouth of the Mississippi River during three of the four superfloods of MWF-5 is estimated to have varied between 0.07 and 0.08 sverdrups (million cubic meters per second). The superflood at 9450-9290 RCYBP is estimated to have had a discharge of 0.10 sverdrups (million cubic meters per second). This research also shows that the Mississippi superfloods of MWF-5 occurred during the Preboreal. The same research found an absence of either meltwater floods or superfloods discharging into the Gulf of Mexico from the Mississippi River during the preceding thousand years, which is known as the cessation event, that corresponds with the Younger Dryas stadial.

The Pleistocene deposits blanketing the Louisiana Continental shelf and slope between the mouth of the Mississippi River and Orca and Pygmy basins largely consist of sediments transported down the Mississippi River mixed with variable additions of local biologically generated carbonate. Because of this, the provenance of the meltwater and superfloods can be readily inferred from the sediment's composition. The composition of the sediments brought into the Gulf of Mexico and deposited on the Louisiana continental shelf and slope during the superfloods of MWF-5 reflect an abrupt change in mineralogy, fossil content, organic matter, and amount after 12,900 years ago at the start of the Younger Dryas interval.

First, after 12,900 years ago, smectite-rich sediments from the Missouri River drainage are progressively and quickly replaced by sediments associated with the Great Lakes region and further south along the Mississippi River, as indicated by their clay mineralogy. Second, after 12,900 years ago, the overall quantity of sediment being transported down the Mississippi River abruptly decreases with a corresponding and significantly increased proportion of locally produced biologically generated carbonate and organic matter. Third, after 12,900 years ago, various analyses, e.g. C/N ratio and Rock–Eval Pyrolysis, indicate that the type of organic matter present changes from organic matter that was reworked from old formations by glacials to well-preserved Holocene organic matter that is mainly of marine origin. Finally, after 12,900 years ago, the presence of reworked nannofossils disappear from sediments accumulating on the Louisiana continental shelf and slope.

The above noted changes in the nature of accumulating sediments indicate that after the start of the Younger Dryas, the southern route for Laurentide Ice Sheet meltwater was largely blocked. On the rare occasions it could flow southward, glacial meltwater flowed through Lake Agassiz and sometimes the Great Lakes to the Mississippi River. As the water moved through either Lake Agassiz or other proglacial lakes, they completely trapped and removed any glacial outwash and the older, reworked organic material and reworked nannofossils that the outwash contained. As a result, the sediment carried by the Mississippi River after the start of the Younger Dryas consisted of illite and chlorite enriched sediments from the Great Lakes region that lacked any reworked nannofossils. These changes argue that the superfloods of MWF-5 which fed Meltwater Pulse B are related to either rare periods of southerly discharge of meltwater through Lake Agassiz, nonglacial periods of climate-enhanced discharge within the Mississippi River Basin, or a combination of both.

== Antarctic iceberg discharge events ==
In case of the Antarctic Ice Sheet, an equivalent well-dated, high-resolution record of the discharge of icebergs from various parts of the Antarctic Ice Sheet for the past 20,000 years is also available. Research by Weber and others constructed a record from variations in the amount of iceberg-rafted debris versus time and other environmental proxies in two cores taken from the ocean bottom within Iceberg Alley of the Weddell Sea. The cores of ocean bottom sediments within Iceberg Alley provide a spatially integrated signal of the variability of the discharge of icebergs into the marine waters by the Antarctic Ice Sheet because it is a confluence zone in which icebergs calved from the entire Antarctic Ice Sheet drift along currents, converge, and exit the Weddell Sea to the north into the Scotia Sea.

Between 20,000 and 9,000 years ago, Weber and others documented eight well-defined periods of increased iceberg calving and discharge from various parts of the Antarctic Ice Sheet. Five of these periods, AID5 through AID2 (Antarctic Iceberg Discharge events), are comparable in duration and have a repeat time of about 800–900 years. The largest of the Antarctic Iceberg Discharge events is AID2. Its peak intensity at about 11,300 years ago, which is synchronous with meltwater pulse 1B in the Barbados sea-level record, is consistent with a significant Antarctic contribution to meltwater pulse 1B. The lack of a sea level response in the Tahiti coral record might indicate a regionally specific sea-level response to a deglaciation event only from the Pacific sector of the Antarctica Ice Sheet.

== See also ==
- Deglaciation
- Holocene glacial retreat
- Younger Dryas
