= Barents–Kara Ice Sheet =

Former ice sheet in Eurasia

Barents–Kara ice sheet
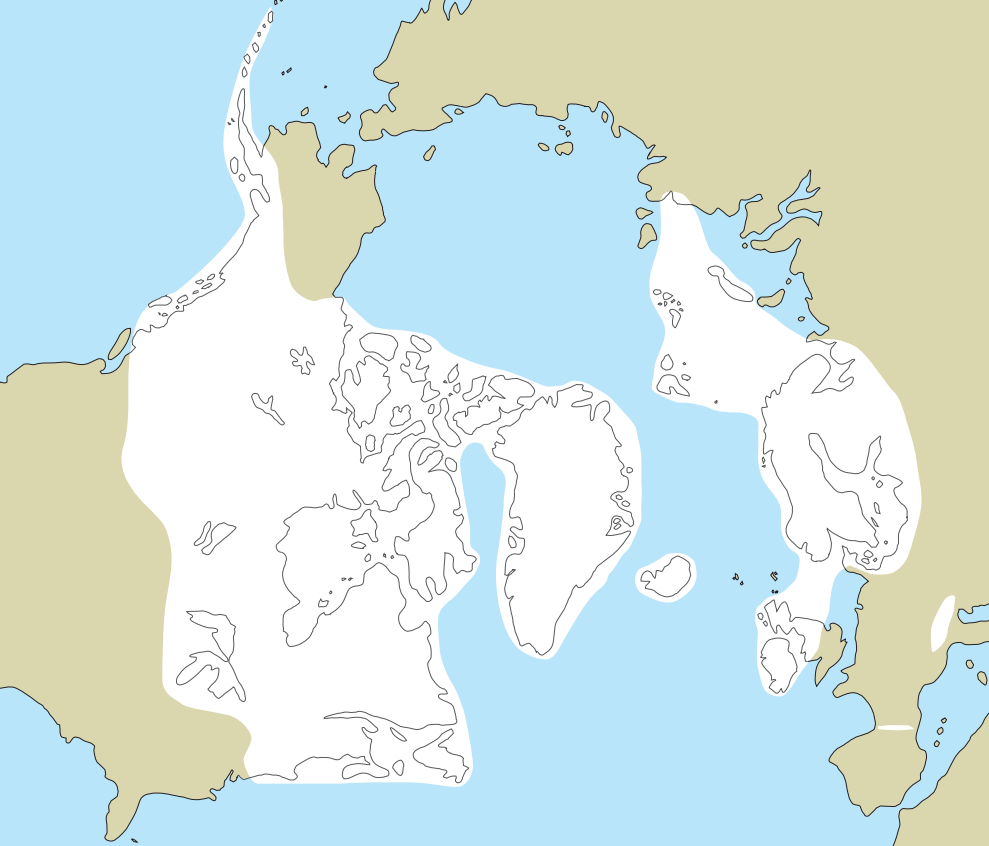
- Barents–Kara ice sheet (top right) on a map of ice sheets in the Northern Hemisphere during the Last Glacial Maximum about 20,000 years ago
- Type: continental
- Location: Eurasia
- Status: gone

The Barents–Kara Ice Sheet was an ice sheet which existed during the Weichselian Glaciation. It is named after the seas it was centred upon: Barents Sea and Kara Sea. The ice sheet covered the Pechora Sea, the southeastern part of the Barents Sea, Novaya Zemlya and the Kara Sea, likely reaching up to Svalbard and Franz Joseph Land in the north. In the continent, it covered from the North Russian Plain to the North Siberian Lowland. During the periods 90–80 ka and 60–50 ka, the produced ice-damming resulted in the creation of lakes and a significant rerouting of drainage in northern Eurasia, including the major rivers Yenisei, Ob, Pechora and Mezen that now flow northwards.
