= Deglaciation =

Consequence of global warming

The deglaciation of North America after the last ice age. Ka means thousand years ago.

Deglaciation is the transition from full glacial conditions during ice ages, to warm interglacials, characterized by global warming and sea level rise due to change in continental ice volume. Thus, it refers to the retreat of a glacier, an ice sheet or frozen surface layer, and the resulting exposure of the Earth's surface. The decline of the cryosphere due to ablation can occur on any scale from global to localized to a particular glacier. After the Last Glacial Maximum (ca. 21,000 years ago), the last deglaciation begun, which lasted until the early Holocene. Around much of Earth, deglaciation during the last 100 years has been accelerating as a result of climate change, partly brought on by anthropogenic changes to greenhouse gases.

The previous deglaciation took place from approximately 22 ka until 11.5 ka. This occurred when there was an annual mean atmospheric temperature on the earth that increased by roughly 5 °C, which was also accompanied by regional high-latitude warming that exceeded 10 °C. This was also followed by noteworthy deep-sea and tropical-sea warming, of about 1–2 °C (deep-sea) and 2–4 °C (tropical sea). Not only did this warming occur, but the global hydrological budget also experienced noticeable changes and regional precipitation patterns changed. As a result of all of this, the world's main ice sheets, including the ones located in Eurasia, North America and parts of the Antarctic melted. As a consequence, sea levels rose roughly 120 metres. These processes did not occur steadily, and they also did not occur at the same time.

== Background ==
The process of deglaciation reflects a lack of balance between existing glacial extent and climatic conditions. As a result of net negative mass balance over time, glaciers and ice sheets retreat. The repeated periods of increased and decreased extent of the global cryosphere (as deduced from observations of ice and rock cores, surface landforms, sub-surface geologic structures, the fossil record, and other methods of dating) reflect the cyclical nature of global and regional glaciology measured by ice ages and smaller periods known as glacials and interglacials. Since the end of the Last glacial period about 12,000 years ago, ice sheets have retreated on a global scale, and Earth has been experiencing a relatively warm interglacial period marked by only high-altitude alpine glaciers at most latitudes with larger ice sheet and sea ice at the poles. However, since the onset of the Industrial Revolution, human activity has contributed to a rapid increase in the speed and scope of deglaciation globally.

=== Greenland ===
Research published in 2014 suggests that below Greenland's Russell Glacier's ice sheet, methanotrophs could serve as a biological methane sink for the subglacial ecosystem, and the region was at least during the sample time, a source of atmospheric methane. Based on dissolved methane in water samples, Greenland may represent a significant global methane source, and may contribute significantly more due to ongoing deglaciation. A study in 2016 concluded based on past evidence, that below Greenland's and Antarctica's ice sheet may exist methane clathrates.

== Causes and effects ==
At every scale, climate influences the condition of snow and ice on Earth's surface. In colder periods massive ice sheets may extend toward the Equator, while in periods warmer than today, the Earth may be completely free of ice. A significant, empirically demonstrated, positive relationship exists between the surface temperature and concentration of Greenhouse gases such as CO_{2} in the atmosphere. The higher concentration, in turn, has a drastic negative impact on the global extent and stability of the cryosphere. On the millennial time scales of Pleistocene glacial and interglacial cycles, the pacemaker of glaciation onset and melting are changes in orbital parameters termed the Milankovitch cycles. Specifically, low summer insolation in the northern hemisphere permits growth of ice sheets, while high summer insolation causes more ablation than winter snow accumulation.

Human activities promoting climate change, notably the extensive use of fossil fuels over the last 150 years and the resulting increase in atmospheric CO_{2} concentrations, are the principal cause of the more rapid retreat of alpine glaciers and continental ice sheets all across the world. For example, the West Antarctic Ice Sheet has receded significantly, and is now contributing to a positive feedback loop that threatens further deglaciation or collapse. Newly exposed areas of the Southern Ocean contain long-sequestered stores of CO_{2} which are now being emitted into the atmosphere and are continuing to impact glacial dynamics.

The principle of isostasy applies directly to the process of deglaciation, especially post-glacial rebound, which is one of main mechanisms through which isostasy is observed and studied. Post-glacial rebound refers to the increase in tectonic uplift activity immediately following glacial retreat. Increased rates and abundance of volcanic activity have been found in regions experiencing post-glacial rebound. If on a large enough scale, an increase in volcanic activity provides a positive feedback to the process of deglaciation as a result CO_{2} and methane released from volcanos.

Periods of deglaciation are also caused in part by oceanic processes. For example, interruptions of the usual deep cold water circulation and penetration depths in the North Atlantic have feedbacks that promote further glacial retreat.

Deglaciation influences sea level because water previously held on land in solid form turns into liquid water and eventually drains into the ocean. The recent period of intense deglaciation has resulted in an average global sea level rise of 1.7 mm/year for the entire 20th century, and 3.2 mm/year over the past two decades, a very rapid increase.

The physical mechanisms by which deglaciation occurs include melting, evaporation, sublimation, calving, and aeolian processes such as wind scouring.

== Deglaciation of the Laurentide Ice Sheet ==
Throughout the Pleistocene Epoch, the Laurentide Ice Sheet spread over large areas of northern North America, with over 5,000,000 square miles of coverage. The Laurentide ice sheet was 10,000 feet deep in some areas, and reached as far south as 37°N. Mapped extent of the Laurentide Ice Sheet during deglaciation has been prepared by Dyke et al. Cycles of deglaciation are driven by various factors, with the main driver being changes in incoming summer solar radiation, or insolation, in the Northern Hemisphere. But, as not all of the rises in insolation throughout time caused deglaciation, to the current ice volumes that we witness today. This leads to a different conclusion, one that suggests that there is a possible climatic threshold, in terms of ice sheets retreating, and eventually disappearing. As Laurentide was the largest mass ice sheet in the Northern Hemisphere, much study has been conducted regarding its disappearance, unloading energy balance models, atmosphere-ocean general circulation models, and surface energy balance models. These studies concluded that the Laurentide ice sheet presented a positive surface mass balance during almost the entirety of its deglaciation, which indicates that the loss of mass throughout its deglaciation was more than likely due to dynamic discharge. It was not until the early Holocene when the surface mass balance switched to become negative. This change to a negative surface mass balance suggested that surface ablation became the driver that resulted in the loss of mass of ice in the Laurentide ice sheet. It is concluded then that the Laurentide ice sheet only began to exhibit behaviours and patterns of deglaciation after radiative forcing and summer temperatures began to rise at the beginning of the Holocene.

== Result of the deglaciation of the Laurentide ice sheet ==
When the Laurentide ice sheet progressed through the process of deglaciation, it created many new landforms and had various effects of the land. First and foremost, as huge glaciers melt, there is a consequently large volume of meltwater. The volumes of meltwater created many features, including proglacial freshwater lakes, which can be sizable. Not only was there meltwater that formed lakes, there were also storms that blew over the inland freshwater. These storms created waves strong enough to erode the ice shores. Once ice cliffs were exposed, due to rising sea levels and erosion caused by waves, the ice bergs were split and shed (calved) off. Large lakes became prevalent, but so did smaller, shallower, relatively short-lived lakes. The appearance and disappearance of small, shallow lakes influenced much of the plant growth, spread and diversity observed today. The lakes acted as barriers to plant migration, but when these lakes drained, the plants could migrate and spread very efficiently.

== The last deglaciation ==
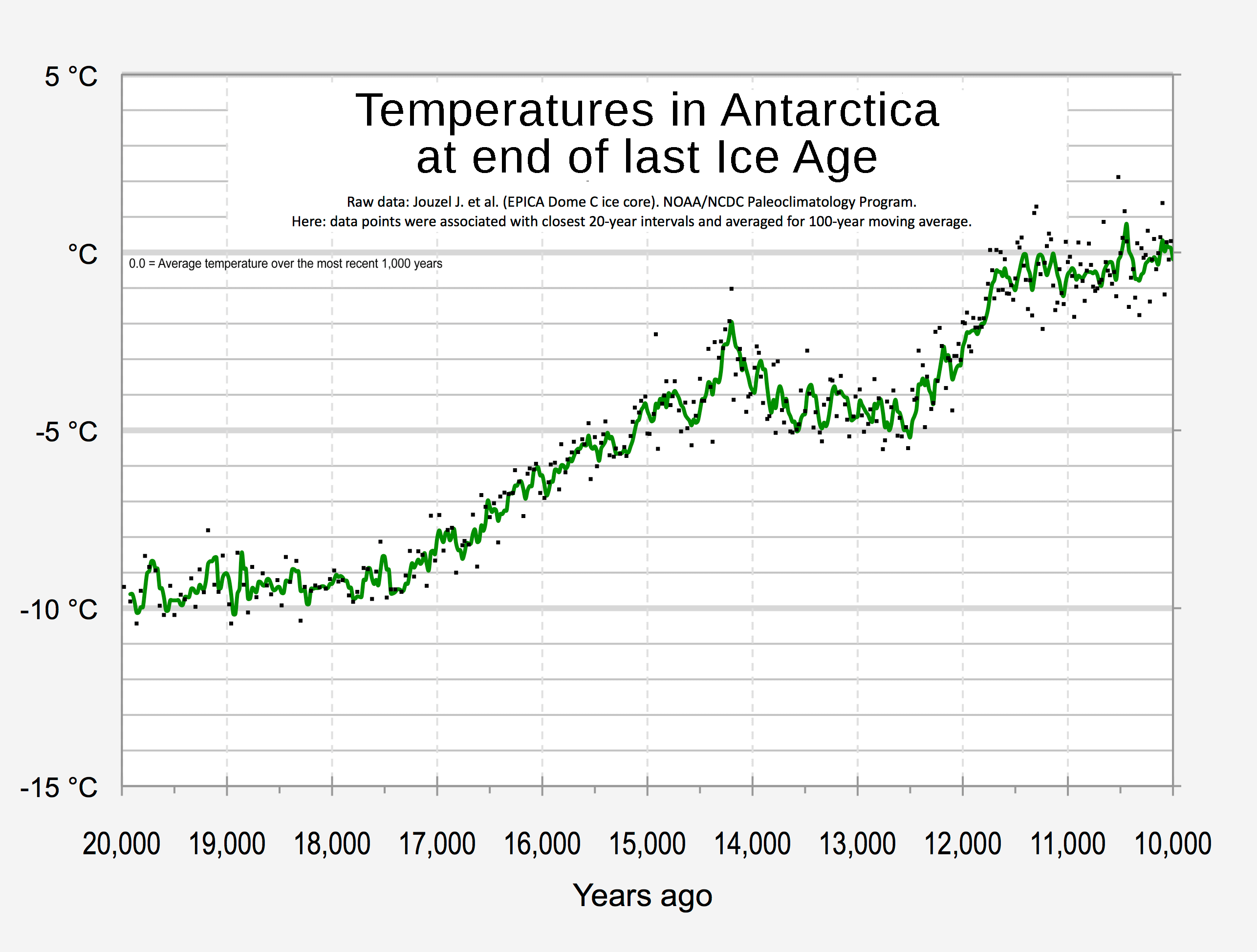
Temperature from 20,000 to 10,000 years ago, derived from EPICA Dome C Ice Core (Antarctica)

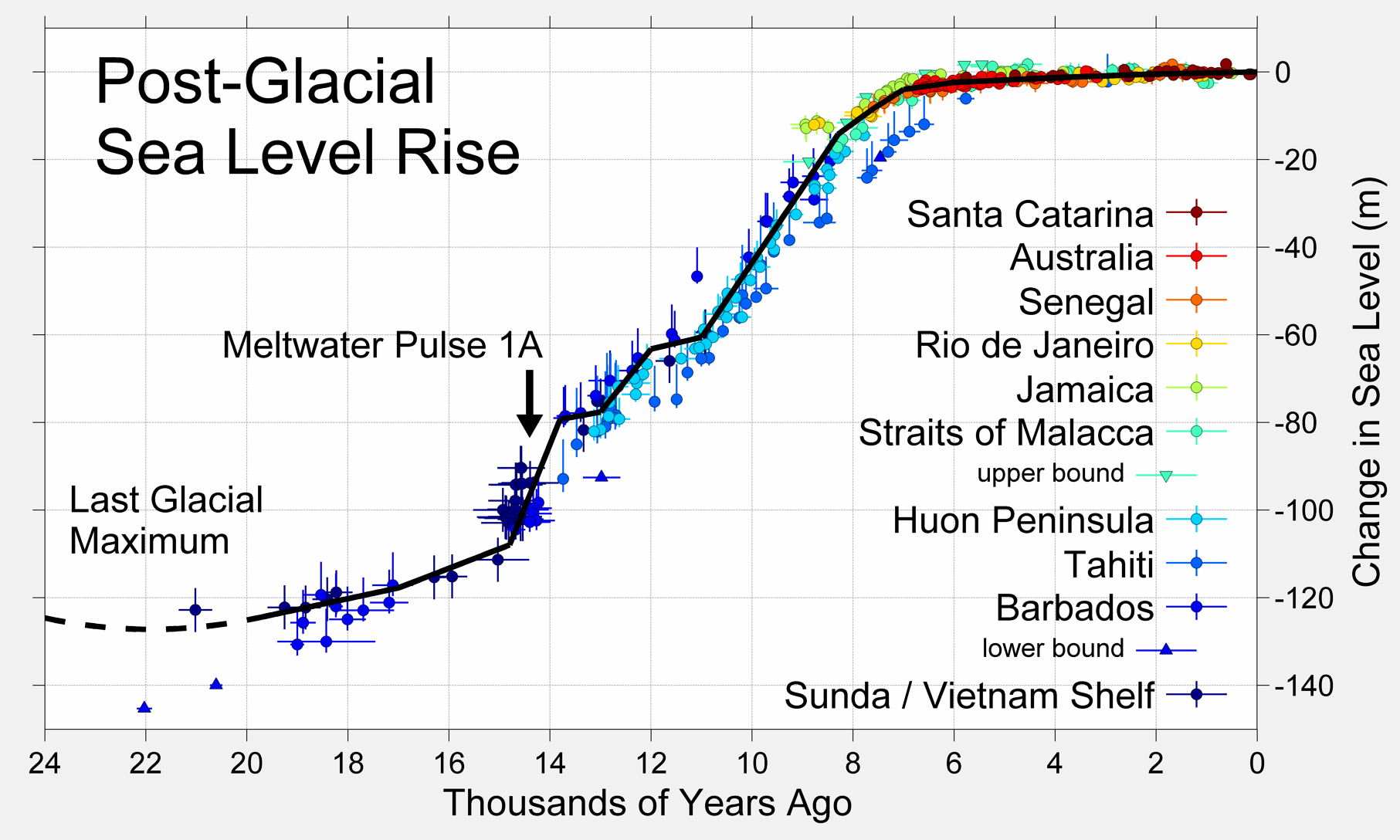
The Post-Glacial Sea Level

The period between the end of the Last Glacial Maximum to the early Holocene (ca. 19k-11k years ago), shows changes in greenhouse gas concentrations and of the Atlantic meridional overturning circulation (AMOC), when sea-level rose by 80 meters. Additionally, the last deglaciation is marked by three abrupt CO_{2} pulses, and records of volcanic eruptions show that subaerial volcanism increased globally by two to six times above background levels between 12 ka and 7 ka.

Between roughly 19ka, the end of the Last Glacial Maximum (or LGM) to 11ka, which was the early Holocene, the climate system experienced drastic transformation. Much of this change was occurring at an astonishing rate, as the earth was dealing with the end of the last ice age. Changes in insolation was the principal reason for this drastic global change in climate, as this was linked with several other changes globally, from the alteration of ice sheets, to the concentration of greenhouse gases fluctuating, and many other feedbacks that resulted in distinct responses, both globally and regionally. Not only were ice sheets and greenhouse gases experiencing alteration, but also additionally to this, there was sudden climate change, and many occurrences of fast, and sizeable rising of sea level. The melting of the ice sheets, along with the rising sea levels did not happen until after 11ka. Nonetheless, the globe had arrived at its present interglacial period, where climate is comparatively constant and stable, and greenhouse gas concentrations exhibit near pre-industrial levels. This data is all available due to studies and information gathered from proxy records, both from the terrestrial and ocean, which illustrates overall global patterns of changes in climate whilst in the period of Deglaciation.

During the Last Glacial Maximum (LGM), there were apparent low atmospheric concentration of Carbon Dioxide (CO_{2}), which was believed to be as a result of larger containment of carbon in the deep ocean, via the process of stratification within the Southern Ocean. These Southern Ocean deep waters contained the least δ13C, which consequently resulted in them being the location with the greatest density, and most salt content during the LGM. The discharge of such sequestered carbon was perhaps a direct outcome of the deep Southern Ocean overturning, driven by heightened wind-driven upwelling, and sea-ice retreat, which are directly correlated to the warming of the Antarctic, and also coinciding with the cold events, the Oldest and Younger Dryas, in the north.

Throughout the LGM in North America, the east was populated by cold-tolerant conifer forests, while the southeast and northwest of the United States sustained open forests in locations that have closed forests today, which suggests that during the LGM temperatures were cooler and overall conditions were much drier than those that we experience today. There is also indication that the southwest of the United States was much wetter during the LGM compared to today, as there was open forest, where today we see desert and steppe. In the United States, the general variation of vegetation implies an overall fall in temperatures of (at minimum 5 °C), a shift of the westerly storm tracks to the south, and a very steep latitudinal temperature gradient.

== Landforms ==
Several landforms visible today are distinctive of the powerful erosional forces at play during, or immediately after, deglaciation. The distribution of such landforms helps to inform the understanding of the glacial dynamics and geologic periods of the past. Studying exposed landforms can also inform the understanding of the present and near future as glaciers all over the world retreat in the current period of climate change. In general, recently deglacialized landscapes are inherently unstable and will tend to move towards an equilibrium.

A sampling of common landforms caused by deglaciation, or caused by the successive geomorphic processes after exposure due to deglaciation:

- Moraine
- Esker
- Kettle
- Kame
- Drumlin
- Thermokarst
- Tunnel valley
- Proglacial lake
- Subglacial channel

== See also ==
- Cryoseism
- IPCC - Intergovernmental Panel on Climate Change
- Special Report on Global Warming of 1.5 °C - an IPCC publication
- Timeline of glaciation
- Quaternary glaciation
- Late Glacial Maximum
- Last glacial period
- Antarctic Cold Reversal
- Glacial erratic
- Till - glacial till
- Holocene glacial retreat
