= Late Holocene Rainforest Crisis =

The Late Holocene Rainforest Crisis was a contraction of the West African rainforest which happened around 600 BC. The forests is believed to have dried; large parts gave way to savanna. After around 600 years the forests had recovered in the equatorial zone. As causes for the crisis, the prevailing theory is precessive natural precipitation change but human suppression of the jungle affected the forests to an unknown extent.
