= African humid period =

Holocene climate period during which northern Africa was wetter than today

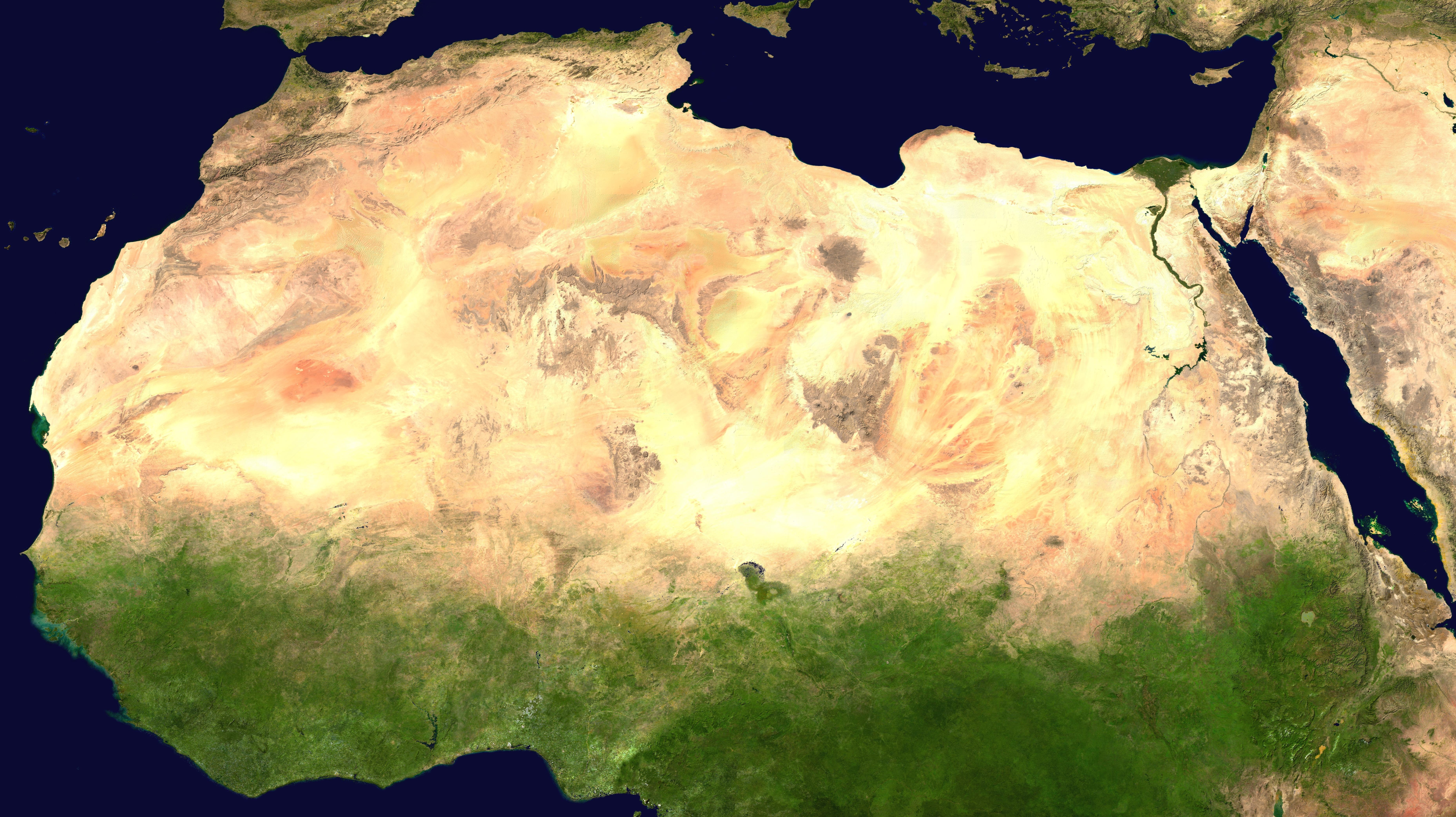
The modern, arid Sahara. The Sahara was not a desert during the African humid period. Instead, most of North Africa was covered by grass, trees, and lakes.

The African humid period (AHP; also known by other names) was a climate period in Africa during the late Pleistocene and Holocene geologic epochs, when North Africa was wetter than it is today. The covering of much of the Sahara by grasses, trees, and lakes was caused by changes in the Earth's axial tilt, changes in vegetation and dust in the Sahara which strengthened the African monsoon, and increased greenhouse gases.

During the preceding Last Glacial Maximum, the Sahara contained extensive dune fields and was mostly uninhabited. It was much larger than it is today, and its lakes and rivers, such as Lake Victoria and the White Nile, were either dry or at low levels. The humid period began about 14,600–14,500 years ago at the end of Heinrich event 1, simultaneously with the Bølling–Allerød warming. Rivers and lakes such as Lake Chad formed or expanded, glaciers grew on Mount Kilimanjaro, and the Sahara retreated. Two major dry fluctuations occurred during the Younger Dryas and the short 8.2-kiloyear event. The AHP ended 6,000–5,000 years ago during the Piora Oscillation cold period. While some evidence points to an end 5,500 years ago in the Sahel, Arabia, and East Africa, the end of the period appears to have occurred in several steps, such as the 4.2-kiloyear event.

The AHP led to the widespread settlement of the Sahara and the Arabian Desert and had a profound effect on African cultures, including the birth of the Ancient Egyptian civilization. People in the Sahara lived as hunter-gatherers and domesticated cattle, goats, and sheep. They left archaeological sites and artifacts, such as one of the oldest canoes ever discovered and rock paintings such as those in the Cave of Swimmers and in the Acacus Mountains. Earlier humid periods in Africa were postulated after the discovery of these rock paintings in now-inhospitable parts of the Sahara. When the period ended, humans gradually abandoned the desert in favour of regions with more secure water supplies, such as the Nile Valley and Mesopotamia, where they gave rise to early complex societies.

== Research ==
=== Discovery and hypotheses ===
In 1850 researcher Heinrich Barth discussed the possibility of past climate change leading to increased wetness in the Sahara after discovering petroglyphs in the Murzuq Desert, as did Ahmed Hassanein following his 1923 exploration of the Libyan Desert when he saw depictions of savanna animals at Gabal El Uweinat. Further discoveries of petroglyphs led desert explorer László Almásy to coin the concept of a Green Sahara in the 1930s. Later in the 20th century, conclusive evidence of a past greener Sahara, the existence of lakes and higher Nile flow levels was increasingly reported, and it was recognized that the Holocene featured a humid period in the Sahara.

The idea that changes in Earth's orbit around the Sun influence the strength of the monsoons was advanced as early as 1921; while the original description was partly inaccurate, later, widespread evidence for such orbital controls on climate was found. At first it was believed that humid periods in Africa correlated with glacial stages ("pluvial hypothesis") before radiocarbon dating became widespread. Beginning in the 1970s, the humidification was attributed to precessional changes.

The development and existence of the AHP has been investigated with archaeology, climate modelling and paleoproxies. Archaeological sites, deposits left by wind, vegetation (e.g., leaf wax), and lakes and wetlands also played an important role. Pollen, lake deposits and former levels of lakes have been used to study the ecosystems of the AHP, and charcoal and leaf impressions have been used to identify vegetation changes. Many unresolved questions concerning the AHP remain: its beginning, cause, intensity, end, land feedbacks, and the fluctuations during the period.

Recently, the hypothesized AHP endpoint of ~6,000 years ago has been experimentally tested in the Paleoclimate Modelling Intercomparison Project, and the effects of the Sahara's greening on other continents have attracted scientific attention. The concept of the Sahara is significantly different than today, and the rich record it left has driven the imagination of the public and scientists alike. It has been used as an analogue for the drying of Mars after the Amazonian-Hesperian.

=== Research issues ===
While the precipitation changes since the Last Glacial Period are well established, the magnitude and timing of the changes are unclear. Depending on how and where measurements and reconstructions are made, different beginning dates, ending dates, durations and precipitation levels have been determined for the AHP. The amounts of precipitation reconstructed from paleoclimate records and simulated by climate modelling are often inconsistent with each other; in general, the simulation of the Green Sahara is considered a problem for Earth system models. There is more evidence of the late phase of the AHP than its beginning. Erosion of lake sediments and carbon reservoir effects make it difficult to date when they dried up. Vegetation changes by themselves do not necessarily indicate precipitation changes, as changes in seasonality, plant species composition, and changes in land use also play a role in vegetation changes. Isotope ratios such as the hydrogen/deuterium ratio that have been used to reconstruct past precipitation values likewise are under the influence of various physical effects, which complicates their interpretation. Most records of Holocene precipitation in eastern Africa come from low altitudes.

=== Terminology ===
The term "African humid period" was coined in 2000 by Peter B. de Menocal et al. Earlier humid periods are sometimes known as "African humid periods", and several dry/wet periods have been defined for Central Africa. In general, these types of climate fluctuations between wetter and drier periods are known as "pluvials" and "interpluvials", respectively. The term "Green Sahara" is frequently used to describe the AHPs. Because the AHP did not affect all of Africa, some scientists have instead used and recommended "North African humid period" and "Northern African humid period".

Other terms that have been applied to the Holocene AHP or correlative climate phases are "Holocene humid period", which also covers an analogous episode in Arabia and Asia; "Early Holocene Humid Period"; "early to mid-Holocene humid episode"; "African Holocene Humid Period"; " "Holocene Pluvial"; "Holocene Wet Phase"; "Kibangien A" in Central Africa; "Makalian" for the Neolithic period of northern Sudan; "Nabtian Pluvial", "Nabtian Wet Phase" or "Nabtian period" for the 14,000–6,000 humid period over the eastern Mediterranean and Levant; "Neolithic pluvial"; "Neolithic Subpluvial"; "Neolithic wet phase"; "Nouakchottien" of the western Sahara 6,500 – 4,000 years before present; "Subpluvial II" and "Tchadien" in the central Sahara 14,000 – 7,500 years before present. The terms "Big Dry", "Léopoldvillien" and Ogolien have been applied to the dry period in the Last Glacial Maximum (LGM), the latter is equivalent to the "Kanemian"; "Kanemian dry period" refers to a dry period between 20,000 and 13,000 years before present (BP) in the Lake Chad area.

== Background and beginning ==
The African humid period took place in the late Pleistocene and early-middle Holocene, with increased precipitation in northern and western Africa due to a northward migration of the tropical rain belt. The AHP stands out within the otherwise relatively climatically stable Holocene. It is part of the so-called Holocene climatic optimum and coincides with a global warm phase, the Holocene Thermal Maximum. (Note: The end of the AHP coincides with the maximum temperatures. In Senegal, temperatures during the AHP were 1 °C (1.8 °F) lower than today there.) Liu et al. 2017 subdivide the humid period into an "AHP I" which lasted until 8,000 years ago, and an "AHP II" from 8,000 years onward, with the former being wetter than the latter.

The AHP was not the first such phase; some evidence exists for as many as 230 older "green Sahara"/wet periods, dating back perhaps to the first appearance of the Sahara 7–8 million BP. Earlier humid periods appear to have been more intense than the AHP of the Holocene, including the exceptionally intense Eemian humid period. This humid period provided the pathways for early humans to cross Arabia and northern Africa and which, together with later moist periods, has been linked to expansions of the Aterian populations and the speciation of insect species. Such humid periods are usually associated with interglacials, while glacial stages correlate to dry periods; they occur during precession minima, unless large ice sheets or insufficient greenhouse gas concentrations suppress their onset.

The Bølling–Allerød warming appears to be synchronous with the onset of the AHP and with increased humidity in Arabia. Later, in the Blytt–Sernander sequence the humid period coincides with the Atlantic period.

=== Conditions before the African humid period ===
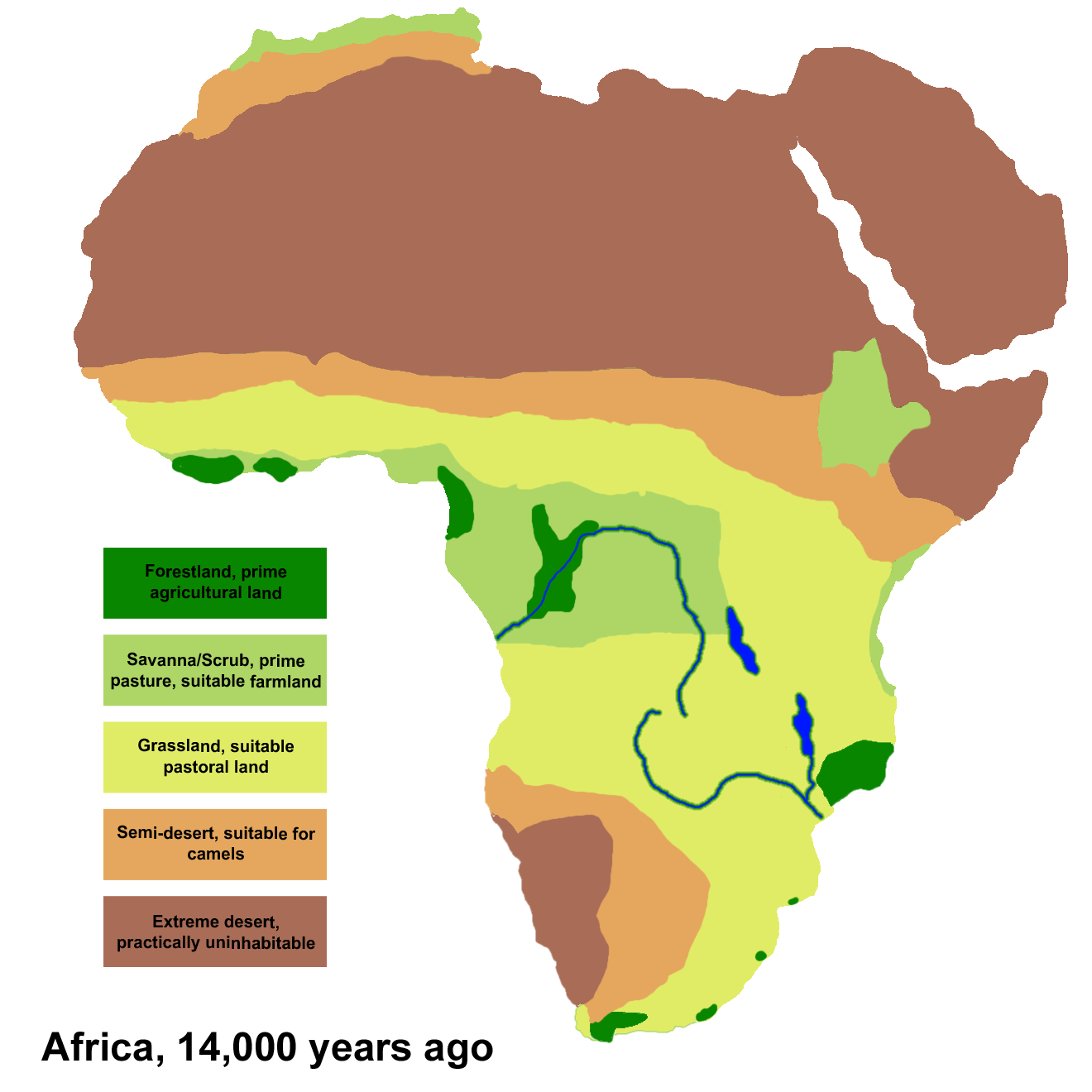
African vegetation during the last glacial maximum

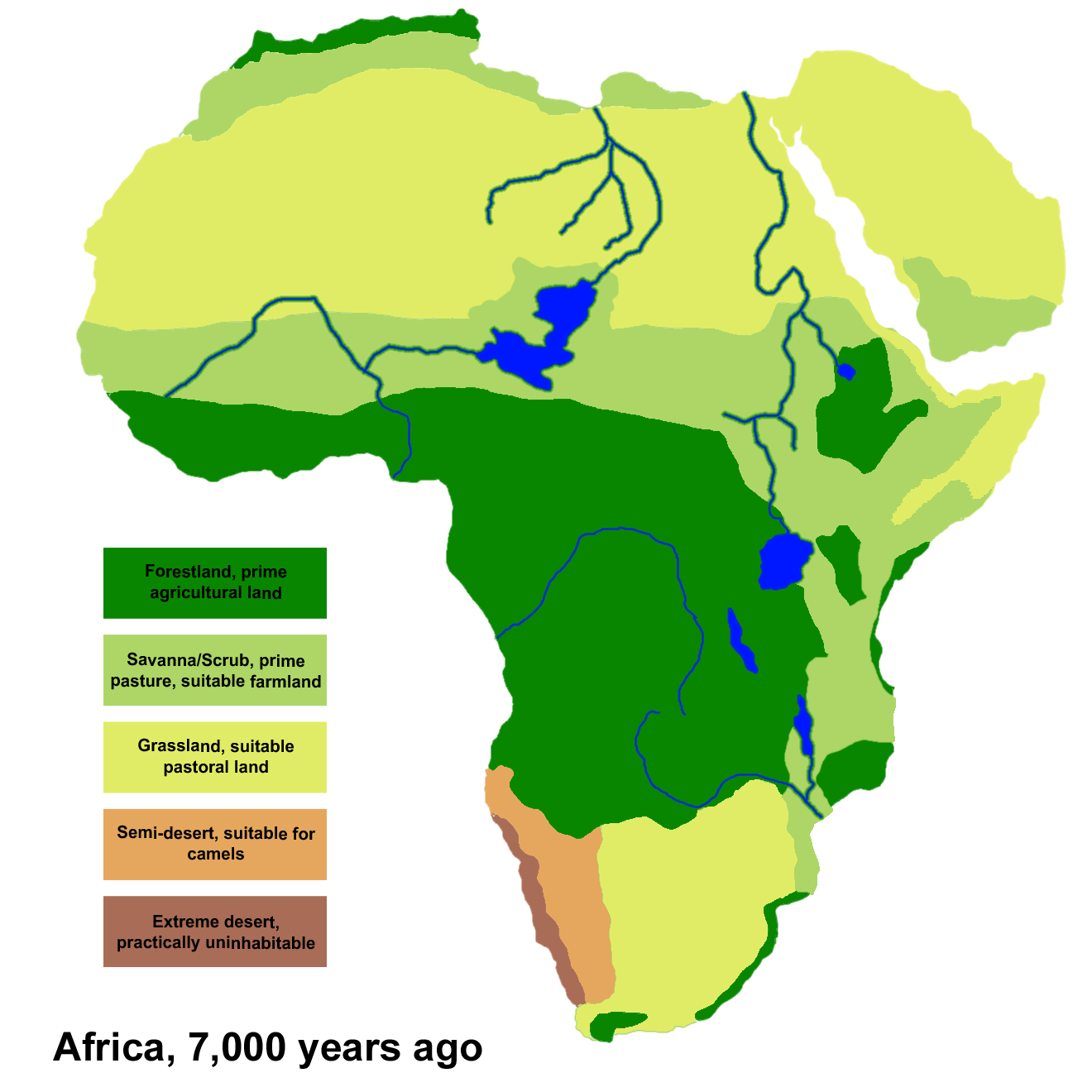
Africa 7000 years ago

During the LGM, the Sahara and Sahel were extremely dry. The extent of dune sheets and water levels in closed lakes indicate that less precipitation fell than today. The Sahara was much larger, extending 500–800 kilometres (310–500 mi) farther south to about 12° northern latitude. Dunes were active much closer to the equator, (Note: Active dunes also formed in Arabia, Israel and the exposed seafloor of the Persian Gulf where dust generation increased.) and rainforests had retreated in favour of afromontane and savanna landscapes as temperatures, rainfall, and humidity decreased.

There is little and often equivocal evidence of human activity in the Sahara or Arabia at that time, reflecting their drier nature; in the Acacus Mountains the last human presence was recorded 70,000–61,000 BP, and by then the LGM humans had largely retreated to the Mediterranean coast and the Nile valley. The aridity during the LGM appears to have been the consequence of the colder climate and larger polar ice sheets, which squeezed the monsoon belt to the equator and weakened the West African Monsoon. The atmospheric water cycle and the Walker and Hadley circulations were weaker as well. Exceptional dry phases are linked to Heinrich events (Note: Although the second half of Heinrich event 1 might have been wetter.) when there are a large number of icebergs in the North Atlantic; the discharge of large amounts of such icebergs between 11,500 and 21,000 BP coincided with droughts in the subtropics.

Before the onset of the AHP, it is thought that Lake Victoria, Lake Albert, Lake Edward, Lake Turkana and the Sudd swamps had dried out. The White Nile had become a seasonal river whose course along with that of the main Nile may have been dammed by dunes. The Nile Delta was partially dry, with sandy plains extending between ephemeral channels and exposed seafloor, and it became a source of sand for ergs (Note: Dune-covered areas.) farther east. Other lakes across Africa, such as Lake Chad and Lake Tanganyika, also had shrunk (Note: However, some lakes persisted in areas where colder temperatures had decreased evaporation.) during this time, and both the Niger River and Senegal River were stunted.

=== Early humidity increases ===
Whether some parts of the desert, such as highlands like the Red Sea Hills, were reached by the westerlies or weather systems associated with the subtropical jet stream—and thus received precipitation—is contentious. It is only clearly supported for the Maghreb in northwestern Africa and parts of northeastern Africa, though river flow/terrace formation and lake development in the Tibesti and Jebel Marra mountains. Residual Nile flow may be explained in this way. The highlands of Africa appear to have been less affected by drought during the LGM.

The end of the glacial drought occurred between 17,000 and 11,000 BP, with an earlier beginning noted in the Acacus, Sinai and Saharan mountains 26,500–22,500 BP and 18,500 BP, respectively. In southern and central Africa, earlier starts 17,000 and 17,500 BP, respectively, may be linked to Antarctic warming, while Lake Malawi appears to have been low until about 10,000 BP.

High lake levels occurred in the Jebel Marra and Tibesti Mountains between 15,000 and 14,000 BP and the earliest stage of glaciation in the High Atlas mountains took place at the same time as the Younger Dryas and early AHP. Around 14,500 BP, lakes started to appear in the arid areas.

=== Onset ===
The humid period began about 15,000–14,500 BP. (Note: Earlier it was thought that it had started about 9,000 years ago, before it was found that it probably began earlier and was interrupted by the Younger Dryas; the older hypothesis has not been entirely abandoned and sometimes the AHP is subdivided into a "terminal Pleistocene" and "early Holocene" AHP. Some lake level curves indicate a stepwise increase of lake levels 15,000 ± 500 and 11,500–10,800 years ago, before and after the Younger Dryas.) The onset of the humid period took place almost simultaneously over all of northern (Note: Whether it commenced first in the eastern Sahara is unclear.) and central Africa, with impacts as far as Santo Antão on Cape Verde. Wet conditions apparently took about one to two millennia to advance northward in the Sahara and Arabia, (Note: Tephrochronological data support a gradual advance.) respectively. The terrestrial system (e.g groundwater bodies) took time to respond to changed conditions.

Lake Victoria reappeared and overflowed; Lake Albert also overflowed into the White Nile 15,000–14,500 BP as did Lake Tana into the Blue Nile. The White Nile flooded part of its valley and reconnected to the main Nile. (Note: This was originally believed to have occurred 7,000 or 13,000 years before present, but a more recent suggestion indicates a reconnection of the Nile 14,000–15,000 years ago.) In Egypt widespread flooding by the "Wild Nile" took place; this "Wild Nile" period led to the largest recorded floods on this river and sedimentation in floodplains. 17,000–16,800 BP meltwater from glaciers in Ethiopia – which were retreating at that time – may have begun to increase the flow of water and sediment in the Nile. In the East African Rift water levels in lakes began to rise by about 15,500/15,000–12,000 BP; Lake Kivu began overflowing into Lake Tanganyika by about 10,500 BP.

Around the same time the AHP started, the cold glacial climate in Europe associated with Heinrich Event 1 ended with climate change as far as Australasia. A warming and retreat of sea ice around Antarctica coincides with the start of the AHP, although the Antarctic Cold Reversal also falls into this time and may relate to a drought interval recorded in the Gulf of Guinea.

== Causes ==
The AHP was caused by a stronger West African Monsoon directed by changes in solar irradiance and in albedo feedbacks. These led to increased moisture import from both the equatorial Atlantic into West Africa, as well as from the North Atlantic and the Mediterranean Sea towards the Mediterranean coasts of Africa and the Tibesti Mountains. There were complex interactions with the atmospheric circulation of the extratropics and between moisture coming from the Atlantic Ocean and the Indian Ocean, and an increased overlap between the areas wetted by the monsoon and those wetted by extratropical cyclones.

Climate models indicate that changes from a dry to a "green" Sahara and back have threshold behaviour, with the change occurring once a certain level of insolation is exceeded; likewise, a gradual drop of insolation often leads to a sudden transition back to a dry Sahara. This is due to various feedback processes that are at work, and in climate models, there is often more than one stable climate-vegetation state. Sea surface temperature and greenhouse gas changes synchronized the beginning of the AHP across Africa.

=== Orbital changes ===
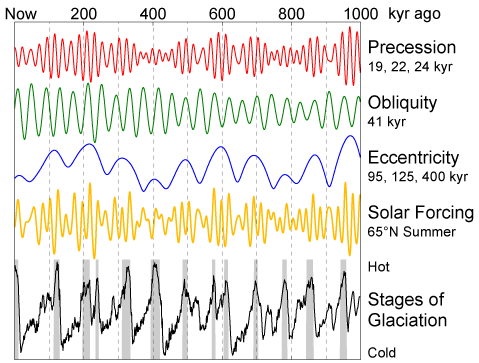
Milankovich cycles over the past one million years

The AHP has been explained by increased insolation during the Northern Hemisphere summer. Due to precession, the season at which Earth passes closest to the Sun on its elliptical orbit – the perihelion – changes, with maximum summer insolation occurring when this happens during Northern Hemisphere summer. Between 11,000 and 10,000 BP, Earth passed through the perihelion at the time of summer solstice, increasing the amount of solar radiation by about 8%, resulting in the African monsoon becoming both stronger and reaching farther north. Between 15,000 and 5,000 BP, summer insolation was at least 4% higher than today. The obliquity also decreased during the Holocene, but the effect of obliquity changes on the climate is focused on the high latitudes, and its influence on the monsoon is unclear.

During summer, solar heating is stronger over the North African land than over the ocean, forming a low pressure area that draws moist air and precipitation in from the Atlantic Ocean. The increased summer insolation strengthened this effect, leading to a stronger monsoon that also reached farther north. The effects of these circulation changes reached as far as the subtropics.

Obliquity and precession are responsible for two of the foremost Milankovich cycles and are responsible not only for the onset and cessation of ice ages but also for monsoon strength variations. Southern Hemisphere monsoons are expected to have the opposite response of Northern Hemisphere monsoons to precession, as the insolation changes are reversed; data from South America bear out this observation. The precession change increased seasonality in the Northern Hemisphere while decreasing it in the Southern Hemisphere.

=== Albedo feedbacks ===
According to climate modelling, orbital changes by themselves cannot increase precipitation over Africa enough to explain the formation of the large desert lakes such as 330,000 square kilometres (130,000 sq mi) Lake Megachad, (Note: Lake Megachad is an expanded Lake Chad which had a size comparable to the Caspian Sea which is today's largest lake.) the climate proxies for precipitation, or the northward expansion of vegetation unless ocean and land surface changes are factored in.

Decreasing albedo resulting from vegetation changes is an important factor in increased precipitation. Specifically, increased precipitation increases the amount of vegetation; vegetation absorbs more sunlight and thus more energy is available for the monsoon. In addition, evapotranspiration from vegetation adds more moisture, although this effect is less pronounced than the albedo effect. Heat fluxes in the soil and evaporation are also altered by the vegetation.

Reduced dust generation from a wetter Sahara, where lakes submerged major dust-generating regions, influences the climate by reducing the amount of light absorbed by dust. Decreased dust emissions also modify cloud properties, making them less reflective and more efficient at inducing precipitation. In climate models, reduced amounts of dust in the troposphere together with vegetation changes can often but not always explain the northward expansion of the monsoon. There is no universal agreement on the effects of dust on precipitation in the Sahel, however, in part because the effects of dust on precipitation may be dependent on its size.

In addition to raw precipitation changes, changes in precipitation seasonality such as the length of dry seasons need to be considered when assessing the effects of climate change on vegetation, as well as the fertilizing effects of increased carbon dioxide concentrations in the atmosphere.

Other sources of albedo changes:

- Changes in soil properties result in changes in the monsoon; replacing desert soils with loamy ones results in increased precipitation, and soils that are wet or contain organic matter reflect less sunlight and accelerate the moistening process. Desert sand changes also modify the albedo.
- Albedo changes caused by lakes and wetlands can alter precipitation in climate models.

=== Intertropical Convergence Zone changes ===
Warmer extratropics during summer may have drawn the Intertropical Convergence Zone (ITCZ) northward by about five or seven degrees latitude, resulting in precipitation changes. Sea surface temperatures off North Africa warmed under orbital effects and through weaker trade winds, leading to a northward movement of the ITCZ and increasing moisture gradients between land and sea. Two temperature gradients, one between a cooler Atlantic during spring and an already warming African continent, the other between warmer temperatures north of 10° latitude and cooler south, may have assisted in this change. In Eastern Africa, ITCZ changes had relatively little effect on precipitation changes. The past position of the ITCZ in Arabia is also contentious.

=== Precipitation changes in East Africa ===
The African humid period in East Africa appears to have been driven by multiple mechanisms. Among the proposed mechanisms are decreased seasonality of precipitation due to increased dry season precipitation, shortening of the dry season, increased precipitation and increased inflow of moisture from the Atlantic and Indian Oceans. The Atlantic moisture inflow was in part triggered by a stronger West African and Indian monsoon, perhaps explaining why the effects of the AHP extended into the Southern Hemisphere.The behaviour of the easterly trade winds is unclear; increased moisture transport by easterly trade winds may have aided in the development of the AHP but alternatively a stronger Indian Monsoon that draws easterly winds away from East Africa may have occurred.

Changes in the Congo Air Boundary (Note: The Congo Air Boundary is the point at which moisture bearing winds from the Indian Ocean collide with those from the Atlantic Ocean and separates the region influenced by August-September rains from the region that remains dry during that season.) or increased convergence along this boundary may have contributed; the Congo Air Boundary would have been shifted east by the stronger westerly winds directed by lower atmospheric pressure over Northern Africa, allowing additional moisture from the Atlantic to reach East Africa. The parts of East Africa that were isolated from Atlantic moisture did not become significantly wetter during the AHP although at one site in Somalia the seasonality of precipitation may or may not have decreased.

Various contributing factors may have led to the increased humidity in East Africa, not all of which were necessarily operating simultaneously during the AHP. Finally, increased greenhouse gas concentrations may have been involved in directing the onset of the AHP in tropical southeastern Africa; there, orbital changes would be expected to lead to climate variations opposite to those in the Northern Hemisphere. The pattern of humidity changes in south-eastern Africa is complex.

=== Additional factors ===
- Climate change in the far northern latitudes may have contributed to the onset of the AHP. The shrinkage of the Scandinavian and the Laurentide Ice Sheets occurred at its beginning, and in climate models, a retreat of the ice sheets is often required to simulate the humid period although their size has little influence on its intensity. Their existence might also explain why the AHP did not start immediately with the early insolation peak, as still existing ice sheets would have cooled the climate.
- Sea surface temperature changes in the Atlantic influence the African monsoon and may have influenced the onset of the AHP. Weaker trade winds and higher insolation would lead to warmer sea surface temperatures, increasing precipitation by amplifying land-sea moisture gradients and evaporation rates. Changes in the Atlantic meridional overturning circulation (AMOC) and North Atlantic temperature gradients were also involved.
- Warming of the Mediterranean Sea increases the amount of Sahel precipitation; this effect is responsible for the recent anthropogenic global warming mediated increase in Sahel precipitation. Warmer sea surface temperatures there might also explain the increased precipitation recorded in the Mediterranean and increased intensity of precipitation reconstructed from former rivers in the Sahara during the AHP.
- Increased precipitation during winter is correlated with a larger spatial extent of Mediterranean precipitation and might have aided in the establishment of the AHP in North Africa, particularly Algeria, Morocco, Northern Egypt, the northern Red Sea, the Tibesti, northern Arabia, and generally at higher latitudes where the monsoon did not arrive or may have been inadequate. This precipitation may have extended to other parts of the Sahara; such would have led to the areas of summer and winter precipitation overlapping and the dry area between the monsoonal and westerlies-influenced climate zones becoming wetter or disappearing altogether. Such changes in Mediterranean-derived precipitation may correlate with changes in the North Atlantic and Arctic Oscillations and with the increased contrast between warm summers and cold winters, and may be driven by orbital changes. Some studies however see a decrease in winter precipitation in northwestern Africa due to a poleward shift of the storm tracks.
- Trough-mediated northward transport of moisture during autumn and spring has also been proposed to explain the increased precipitation and its underestimation by climate models. Increased northward moisture transport by such troughs increases autumn rainfall in the Sahara when the ITCZ is shifted north; thus, its moisture can be more easily captured by troughs, generating moisture plumes. This mechanism is particularly relevant to the northwestern Sahara south of the Atlas Mountains, where the monsoon proper might not have reached, and may also be relevant to northern Arabia.
- Weaker subtropical anticyclones were proposed as an explanation during the 1970s–1980s.
- In montane regions such as the Meidob volcanic field cold temperatures after the last glacial maximum may have reduced evaporation and thus allowed an early onset of humidity.
- Changes in the Earth's geomagnetic field may be linked to the humidity changes.
- Increased moisture supply from dispersed lakes and larger lakes like Lake Megachad may have increased the precipitation, although this effect is probably not adequate to explain the entire AHP and model-dependent. A similar role has been attributed to the extensive wetlands, drainages, and lakes in the Eastern Sahara and to the ecosystem in general.
- Two high elevation winds, the African Easterly Jet and the Tropical Easterly Jet modulate atmospheric air flows over Africa and thus also the amount of precipitation; the Tropical Easterly Jet comes from India and is powered by temperature gradients between the tropics and the subtropics while the African Easterly Jet is powered by temperature gradients in the Sahel. A stronger West African Monsoon resulted in a weaker African Easterly Jet and thus decreased transport of moisture out of Africa.
- Increased atmospheric carbon dioxide concentrations may have played a role in triggering the AHP, especially its extension across the equator, as well as its resumption after the Younger Dryas and Heinrich event 1 through increased sea surface temperatures. Carbon dioxide concentrations have a strong influence on the intensity of orbital changes needed to start an AHP but do not play a major role in controlling its intensity.
- In some parts of the Sahara, increased water supply from montane regions may have assisted in the development of moist conditions.
- Larger forests in Eurasia may have led to a northward shift of the ITCZ.
- Along the coast of Senegal, sea level rise helped the establishment of the AHP vegetation.
- Other proposed mechanisms involve convection occurring above the atmospheric boundary layer, increased latent heat fluxes, changes in tropical wave activity over Africa, low pressure in northwestern Africa drawing moisture into the Sahara, stronger Asian monsoons drawing Indian Ocean moisture to Africa, increased runoff due to changes in the precipitation regime rather than precipitation quantity, changes in the Red Sea Trough (Note: The Red Sea Trough is a low pressure system in the atmosphere, that extends from the southern Red Sea and the ITCZ there to the Levant and Mediterranean, and plays a role in autumn precipitation in the region.) (for Arabia), changes in the solar cycles and complex atmospheric flow phenomena.

== Effects ==
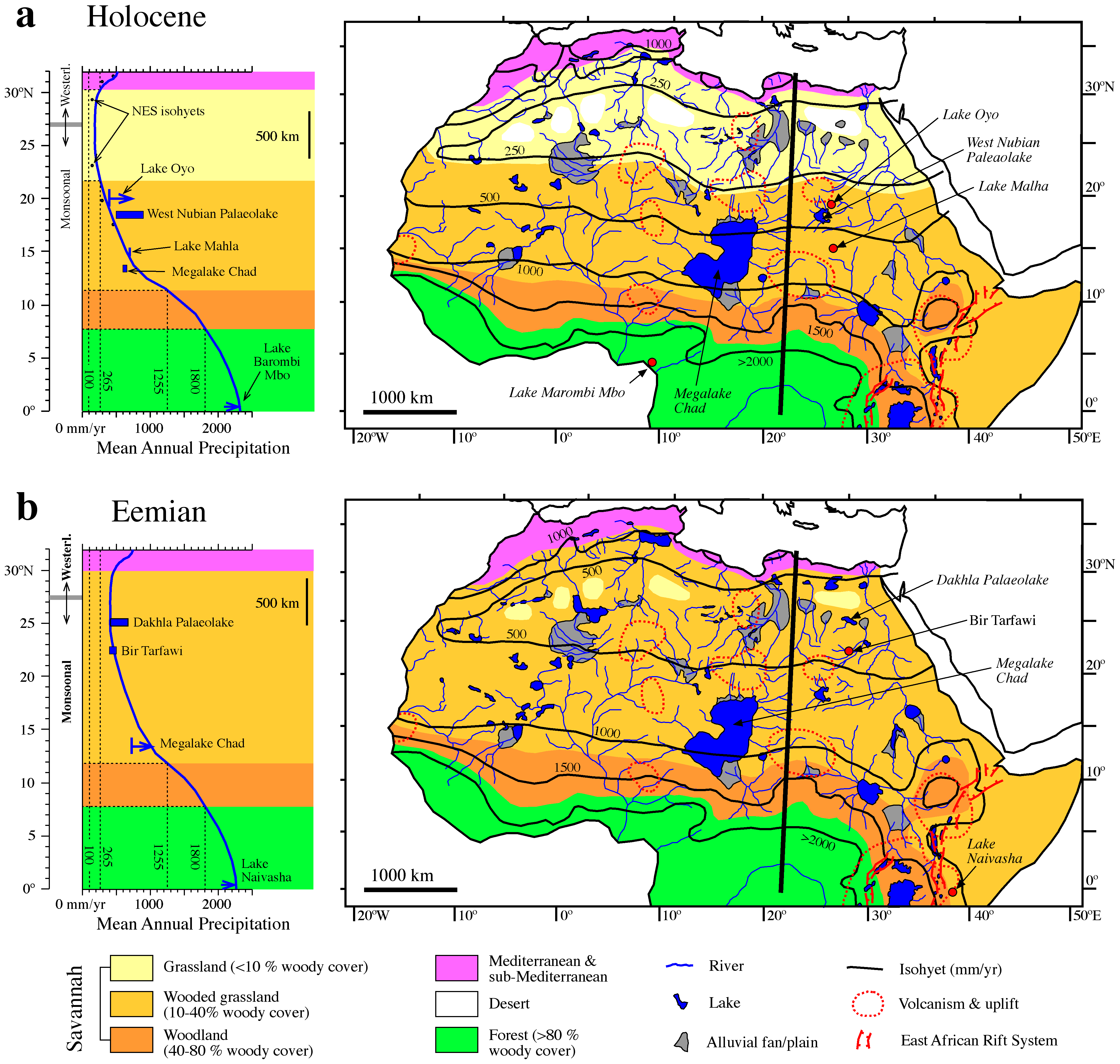
Vegetation and water bodies in the Eemian (bottom) and Holocene (top)

The African humid period extended over most of Africa: The Sahara and eastern, southeastern and equatorial Africa. In general, forests and woodlands expanded throughout the continent. A similar wet episode took place in the tropical Americas (Note: In the Caribbean, a wet period has been identified in the mid-Holocene which correlated with the African wet period and was preceded and followed by drier conditions.) and Asia, (Note: Where the Monsoon of South Asia penetrated farther inland and was more intense starting about 14,800 years ago. In Central Asia, increased snowmelt and changes in the Westerlies caused roughly synchronous but unrelated precipitation increases.) including the Makran region, the Middle East and the Arabian Peninsula; the episode appears to relate to the same orbital forcing as the AHP. An early Holocene monsoonal episode extended as far as the Mojave Desert in North America. In contrast, a drier episode is recorded from much of South America where Lake Titicaca, Lake Junin, the discharge of the Amazon River, and water availability in the Atacama were lower.

The discharge of the Congo, Niger, Nile, Ntem, Rufiji, and Sanaga rivers increased. Runoff from Algeria, equatorial Africa, northeastern Africa, and the western Sahara was also larger. Increased discharge led to changes in the morphology of the river systems and their alluvial plains, and the Senegal River expanded its riverbed, breached dunes and re-entered the Atlantic Ocean.

=== Flora and fauna of the Sahara ===
During the African humid period, lakes, rivers, wetlands and vegetation including grass and trees covered the Sahara and Sahel, creating a "Green Sahara" with a land cover that has no modern analogues. Evidence includes pollen data, archaeological sites, evidence of faunal activity such as diatoms, mammals, ostracods, reptiles and snails, buried river valleys, organic-rich mats, mudstones, evaporites as well as travertines and tufas deposited in subaqueous environments.

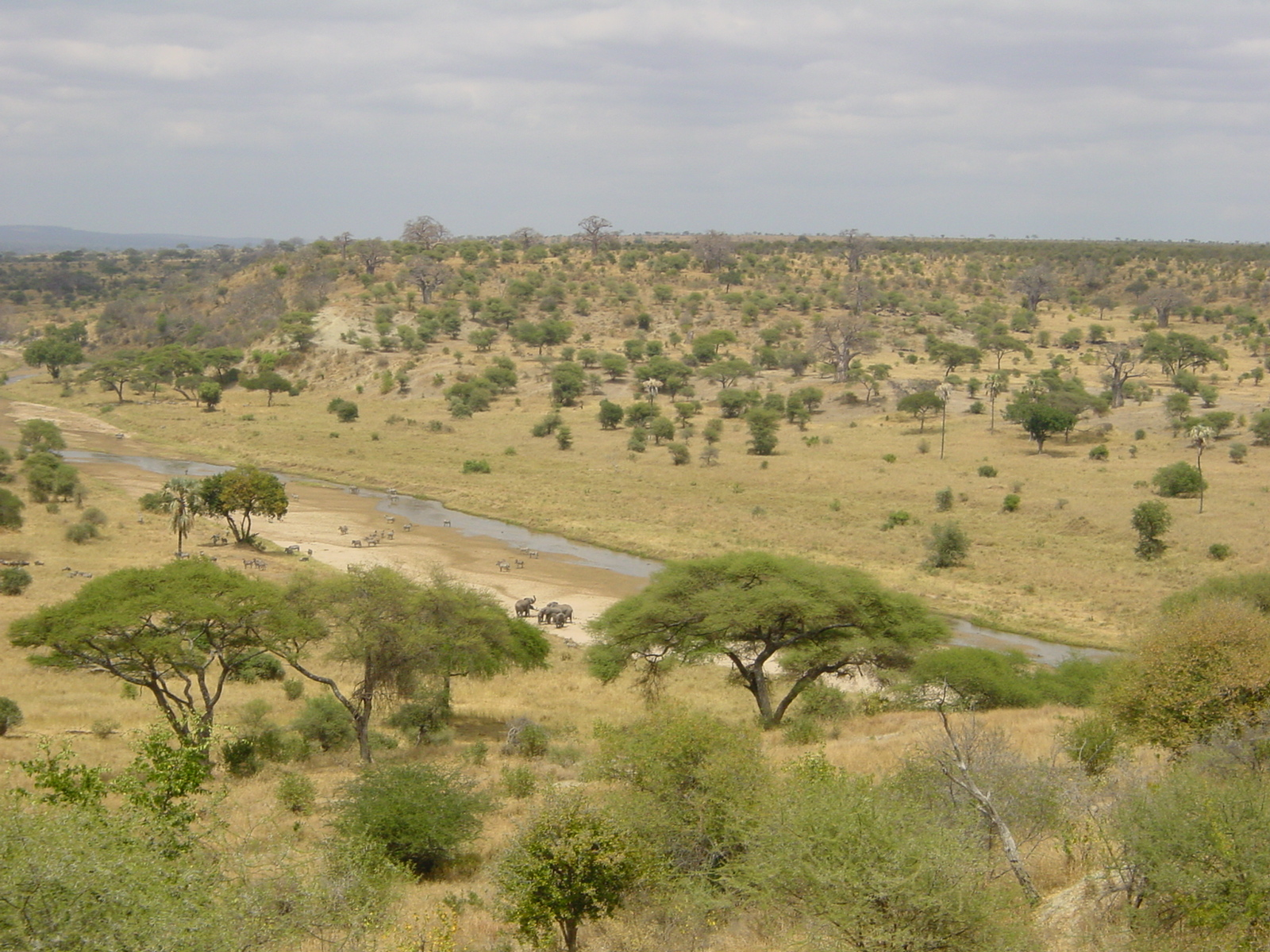
A present-day savannah, Tarangire National Park, Tanzania

The vegetation cover then extended over almost all of the Sahara and consisted of an open grass savannah with shrubs and trees, with a moist savanna vegetation getting established in the mountains. In general, the vegetation expanded northward to 27–30° northern latitude in West Africa with a Sahel boundary at about 23° north, as the Sahara was populated by plants that today often occur about 400 kilometres (250 mi)-600 kilometres (370 mi) farther south. The northward movement of vegetation took some time, and some plant species moved faster than others. Plants that perform C3 carbon fixation became more common. The fire regime has important effects on the vegetation and fauna; during the AHP, with some northern areas becoming wet enough that vegetation could sustain burns, and more southern areas becoming too wet.

Forests and plants from the humid tropics were concentrated around lakes, rivers and the Atlantic Ocean coast of Senegal; waterbodies were also settled by aquatic and partially aquatic plants and the Senegalese coast by mangroves. The landscape during the AHP has been described as a mosaic between various vegetation types of semi-desert, humid or tropical origin rather than a simple northward displacement of plant species, There was no southward displacement of Mediterranean plants during the Holocene and on the Tibesti Mountains cold temperatures may have restricted the expansion of tropical plants. Pollen data often show a dominance of grasses over humid tropics trees. The tree Lophira alata and others may have spread out of the African forests during the AHP, and the Lactuca plants may have split into two species under the effects of the AHP and other climate changes in Africa during the Holocene.

The Sahara climate did not become entirely homogeneous; its central-eastern parts were probably drier than the western and central sectors and the Libyan sand sea was still a desert although pure desert areas retreated to small core areas or became arid/semiarid. An arid belt may have existed north of 22° latitude and towards the Nile Delta, or the vegetation and the African monsoon might have reached 28–31° northern latitude; in general conditions between 21° and 28° northern latitude are poorly known. Dry areas may have persisted in the rain shadows of mountains and could have supported arid climate vegetation, explaining the presence of its pollen in sediment cores. In addition, north–south gradations in vegetation patterns have been reconstructed from charcoal and pollen data.

Fossils record changes in the animal fauna of the Sahara. This fauna included antelopes, baboons, birds, cane rats, catfish, clams, cormorants, crocodiles, elephants, frogs, gazelles, giraffes, hartebeest, hares, hippopotamuses, molluscs, Nile perches, pelicans, rhinoceroses, snake-eagles, snakes, tilapia, toads, turtles and many more animals, and in Egypt there were African buffaloes, spotted hyenas, warthogs, wildebeest and zebra. Additional birds include brown-necked raven, coot, common moorhen, crested grebe, glossy ibis, long-legged buzzard, rock dove, spur-winged goose and tufted duck. Some migratory birds may have changed their flying route in response to the AHP. Large herds of animals lived in the Sahara. Some animals expanded over the whole desert, while others were limited to places with deep water. Humid periods in the Sahara may have allowed species to cross the now-desert. A reduction in open grasslands at the beginning of the AHP may explain the decline of the populations of some mammals during and a population bottleneck in cheetahs at the start of the humid period, while leading to the expansion of the population of other animals such as Hubert's multimammate mouse and Natal multimammate mouse.

=== Lakes and rivers of the Sahara ===
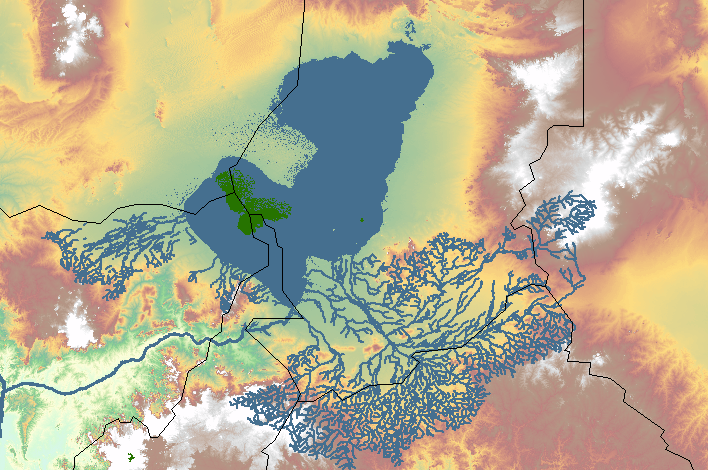
Lake Megachad, with present-day Lake Chad highlighted in green

A number of lakes formed or expanded in the Sahara and the Hoggar and Tibesti Mountains. The largest of them was Lake Chad which increased to at least ten times its present-day size to form Lake Megachad or Megalake Chad, then the largest lake on Earth. This enlarged Lake Chad reached dimensions of 1,000 by 600 kilometres (620 mi × 370 mi) in north–south and east–west direction respectively, covering the Bodélé Depression and perhaps as much as 8% of the present-day Sahara desert. It influenced the climate itself; for example rainfall would have been reduced at the centre of the lake and increased at its margins. Lake Chad was possibly fed from the north by rivers draining the Hoggar (Taffassasset drainage) and Tibesti Mountains, from the Ennedi Mountains in the east through the "Eastern palaeorivers" and from the south by the Chari-Logone and Komadugu Rivers. The Chari River was the main tributary while the rivers draining the Tibesti formed alluvial fans/the Angamma river delta at their entry into northern Lake Chad. Skeletons of elephants, hippos and hominins have been found in the Angamma delta, which is the dominant shoreline feature of northern Lake Chad. The lake overflowed into the Niger River during highstand through the Mayo Kebbi and the Benue River, eventually reaching the Gulf of Guinea. Older dune systems were submerged by Lake Chad.

Among the large lakes which may have formed in the Sahara are Lake Megafezzan in Libya and Lake Ptolemy in Sudan. Quade et al. 2018 raised some doubts about the size and existence of some of these lakes such as Lake Ptolemy, Lake Megafezzan, Lake Ahnet-Mouydir; it is possible that giant lakes only formed in the southern part of the Sahara. Other lakes are known from Adrar Bous in Niger, Era Kohor and Trou au Natron in the Tibesti Mountains, I-n-Atei in the Hoggar, at Ine Sakane and in Taoudenni in Mali, the Garat Ouda and Takarkori Lakes in the Acacus Mountains, Chemchane in Mauretania, at Guern El Louläilet in the Great Western Erg, and Hassi el Mejnah and Sebkha Mellala both in Algeria, at Wadi Shati and elsewhere in the Fezzan in Libya, at Bilma, Dibella, Fachi and Gobero in the Ténéré, Seeterrassental in Niger and at "Eight Ridges", El Atrun, Lake Gureinat, Merga, "Ridge", Sidigh, Wadi Mansurab, Selima and Oyo in Sudan. The lakes of Ounianga merged into two large lakes and overflowed, either above surface or underground. Mosaics of small lakes developed in some regions, such as the Grand Erg Occidental. Wetlands also expanded during the AHP, but both their expansion and subsequent retreat were slower than that of lakes. The Saharan topography prevents rapid drainage of accumulated water, thus favouring the development of waterbodies. The Niger River, which had been dammed by dunes during the LGM, formed a lake in the Timbuktu region that eventually overflowed and drained at some point during the AHP.

In some parts of the Sahara ephemeral lakes formed such as at Abu Ballas, Bir Kiseiba, Bir Sahara, Bir Tarfawi and Nabta Playa (Note: Both Bir Kiseiba and Nabta Playa feature archaeological sites; Nabta may have been a religious centre of regional importance.) in Egypt, which may relate to later Egyptian religions, or swamp-lakes such as at Adrar Bous close to the Air Mountains. Ephemeral lakes developed between dunes, and a "freshwater archipelago" appears to have existed in the Murzuq basin. All these lake systems left fossils such as fish, limnic sediments and fertile soils that were later used for agriculture (El Deir, Kharga Oasis). Finally, crater lakes formed in volcanic fields such as Trou au Natron and Era Kohor in the Tibesti, and sometimes survive to this day as smaller remnant lakes such as Malha crater in the Meidob volcanic field. Potentially, the increased availability of water during the AHP may have facilitated the onset of phreatomagmatic eruptions such as maar formation in the Bayuda volcanic field, although the chronology of volcanic eruptions there is not well known enough to substantiate a link to the AHP.

Increased precipitation resulted in the formation or reactivation of river systems in the Sahara. The large Tamanrasset River flowed from the Atlas Mountains and Hoggar westward towards the Atlantic and entered it in the Bay of Arguin in Mauritania. It once formed the 12th largest watershed in the world and left a submarine canyon and riverine sediments. Together with other rivers it formed estuaries and mangroves in the Bay of Arguin. Other rivers in the same area also formed submarine canyons, and sediment patterns in marine sediment cores and the occurrence of submarine landslides in the area have been related to the activity of these rivers.

Rivers such as the Irharhar in Algeria, Libya and Tunisia and the Sahabi and Kufra rivers in Libya were active during this time although there is some doubt that they had perennial flow or that they reached the sea directly; they appear to have been more important in earlier humid periods. Small watersheds, wadis and rivers discharging into endorheic basins such as Wadi Tanezzuft also carried water during the AHP, leading to increased erosion. In Egypt, some rivers active during the AHP are now gravel ridges. In the Air, Hoggar and Tibesti Mountains, the so-called "Middle Terrace" was emplaced at this time. The rivers (Note: Overflowing lakes and alluvial fans established further connections between watersheds.) and lakes of the Sahara may have acted as pathways for the spread of humans and animals; animals that might have propagated through the Sahara in these waterbodies are Nile crocodile and the fish Clarias gariepinus and Tilapia zillii. The name Tassili n'Ajjer, which means "plateau of the rivers" in Berber, may be a reference to past river flows. On the other hand, intense flows of these rivers may have made their shores dangerous to humans and thus created additional impetus for human movement. Now-dry river valleys from the AHP in the eastern Sahara have been used as analogues for former river systems on Mars.

=== Humans of the Sahara ===
Conditions and resources were ripe for first hunter-gatherers, fishermen and, later, pastoralists; the exact chronology – when humans returned in the Sahara after the onset of the AHP – is disputed. They may have come either from the north (Maghreb or Cyrenaica) where the Capsian culture (Note: Which may have expanded into previously dry areas at the beginning of the AHP.) was located, the south (Sub-Saharan Africa), or the east (Nile Valley). The human population in the Sahara rapidly increased during the AHP, interrupted by a brief decline between 7,600 and 6,700 years ago. Traces of human activity have been found in the Acacus Mountains where caves and rock shelters were used as basecamps for humans, such as the Uan Afuda cave and the Uan Tabu and Takarkori rock shelters. The first occupation in Takarkori took place between 10,000 and 9,000 years ago; about five millennia of human cultural evolution are recorded there. At Gobero in the Ténéré desert a cemetery has been found, which has been used to reconstruct the lifestyle of these former inhabitants of the Sahara, and at Lake Ptolemy in Nubia humans settled close to the lake shore, using its resources and perhaps even engaging in leisure activities. At that time, many humans appear to have depended on water-bound resources, seeing as many of the tools left by the early humans are associated with fishery; hence this culture is also known as "aqualithic" although substantial differences between the cultures of various places have been found. The greening of the Sahara led to a demographic expansion and especially in the Eastern Sahara human occupancy coincides with the AHP. Conversely occupation decreased along the Nile valley, as it became inhospitable to human settlement due to flooding extending to the Nile delta. Humans moved into the Sudanese segment of the Nile valley only by about 11,000 years ago.

Humans were hunting large animals with weapons that have been found in archaeological sites and wild cereals occurring in the Sahara during the AHP such as brachiaria, sorghum and urochloa were an additional source of food. Humans also domesticated cattle, goats and sheep. Cattle domestication may have occurred especially in the more environmentally variable Eastern Sahara, where the lack of lakes (cattle having high requirements of drinking water) may however have limited the occurrence of cattle. Animal husbandry picked up in earnest around 7,000 years ago when domestic animals came to the Sahara, and a population boom may be linked to this change in cultural practice; cattle and goats spread southwestwards from northeasternmost Africa from 8,000 years before present. Dairying has been demonstrated in some locations and cattle-husbandry is supported by the frequent depiction of cattle in rock paintings. The relative importance of hunter-gatherer practices and pastoralism, and whether people were sedentary or migratory, is unclear. The Dufuna canoe, one of the oldest known ships in the world, appears to date to the Holocene humid period and implies that the waterbodies of that time were navigated by humans. The cultural units "Masara" and "Bashendi" existed in Dakhleh Oasis during the AHP. In the Acacus Mountains, several cultural horizons known as Early and Late Acacus and Early, Middle, Late and Final Pastoral have been identified while in Niger the Kiffian culture has been related to the beginning of the AHP. Ancient civilizations thrived, with farming and animal husbandry taking place in Neolithic settlements. Possibly, the domestication of plants in Africa was delayed by the increased food availability during the AHP, it only took place around 2,500 BC.

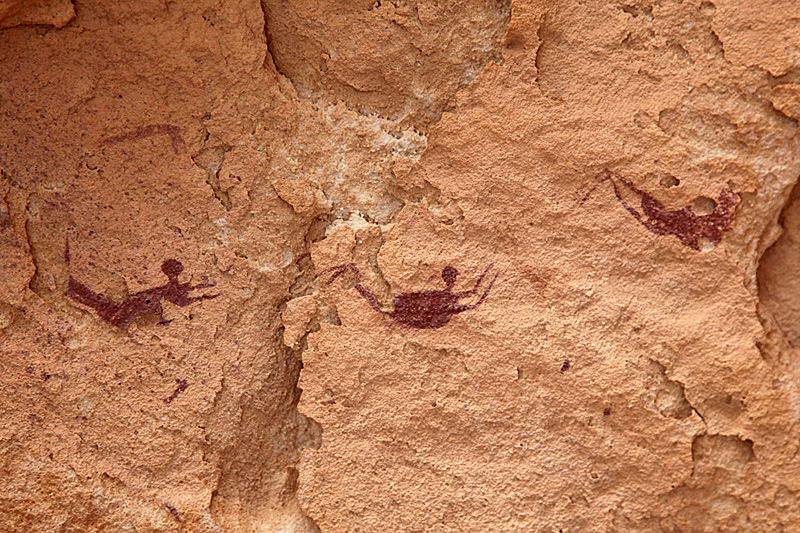
Images of swimming people in the Cave of Swimmers

Humans created rock art such as petroglyphs and rock paintings in the Sahara, which has the world's highest density of such creations. Scenes include animals and everyday life such as swimming which supports the presence of past wetter climates. One well-known such petroglyph location is the Cave of Swimmers in the Gilf Kebir mountains of Egypt; other well known sites are the Gabal El Uweinat mountains also of Egypt, Arabia and the Tassili n'Ajjer in Algeria where rock paintings from this time have been discovered. Humans also left artifacts such as Fesselsteine (Note: Fesselsteine are stony artifacts, that are interpreted as tools for restraining animals.) and ceramics in what today are inhospitable deserts. North Africa, together with East Asia, is one of the first places where pottery was developed probably under the influence of increased availability of resources during the AHP. The humid period also favoured its development and spread in West Africa during the 10th millennium BC; the so-called "wavy line" or "dotted wavy-line" motif was widespread across Northern Africa and as far as Lake Turkana. A similar but more circumscribed spread occurred with the Ounan arrow points.

These populations have been described as Epipaleolithic, Mesolithic and Neolithic and produced a variety of lithic tools and other assemblages. In West Africa, the cultural change from the African Middle Stone Age to the Late Stone Age accompanied the beginning of the AHP. In Sudan, the beginning of the early Khartoum culture coincides with the initiation of the AHP. Genetic and archaeological data indicate that these populations which exploited the resources of the AHP Sahara probably originated in Sub-Saharan Africa and moved north after some time, after the desert got wetter; in return, the AHP facilitated the movement of some Eurasian populations into Africa, and bidirectional travel across the Sahara more generally. The northward spread of Macrohaplogroup L and Haplogroup U6 genomic lineages may reflect this tendency but did not result in widespread genetic exchanges between Northern and sub-Saharan Africa. Elsewhere, newly formed or expanded water courses may have restricted human mobility and isolated populations. These favourable conditions for human populations may be reflected in paradise myths such as the Garden of Eden in The Bible and Elysium and the Golden Age in Classical Antiquity, while a possible role in the development of the Afroasiatic and the spread of the Niger-Congo and Nilo-Saharan languages is debatable. References in Egyptian chronicles about moist lands along the Red Sea may record the wet conditions of the late AHP.

=== Additional manifestations in the Sahara ===
The expanded vegetation and soil formation stabilized previously active dunes, eventually giving rise to the present-day draa dunes in the Great Sand Sea of Egypt for example, although there is uncertainty about whether this stabilization was widespread. Soil development and biological activity in soils are attested in the Acacus Mountains and the Mesak Settafet area of Libya, but evidence of soil formation/pedogenesis such as bog iron or kaolinite formation are described from other parts of the Sahara and Sahel as well. In the Selima Sand Sheet, the landscape underwent erosional truncation and bioturbation. Erosion by increased runoff delayed soil development until after a few millennia after the onset of the AHP. The Central and Southern Sahara saw the development of alluvial deposits while sebkha deposits are known from the Western Sahara. Lightning strikes into soil left lightning-altered rocks in parts of the Central Sahara.

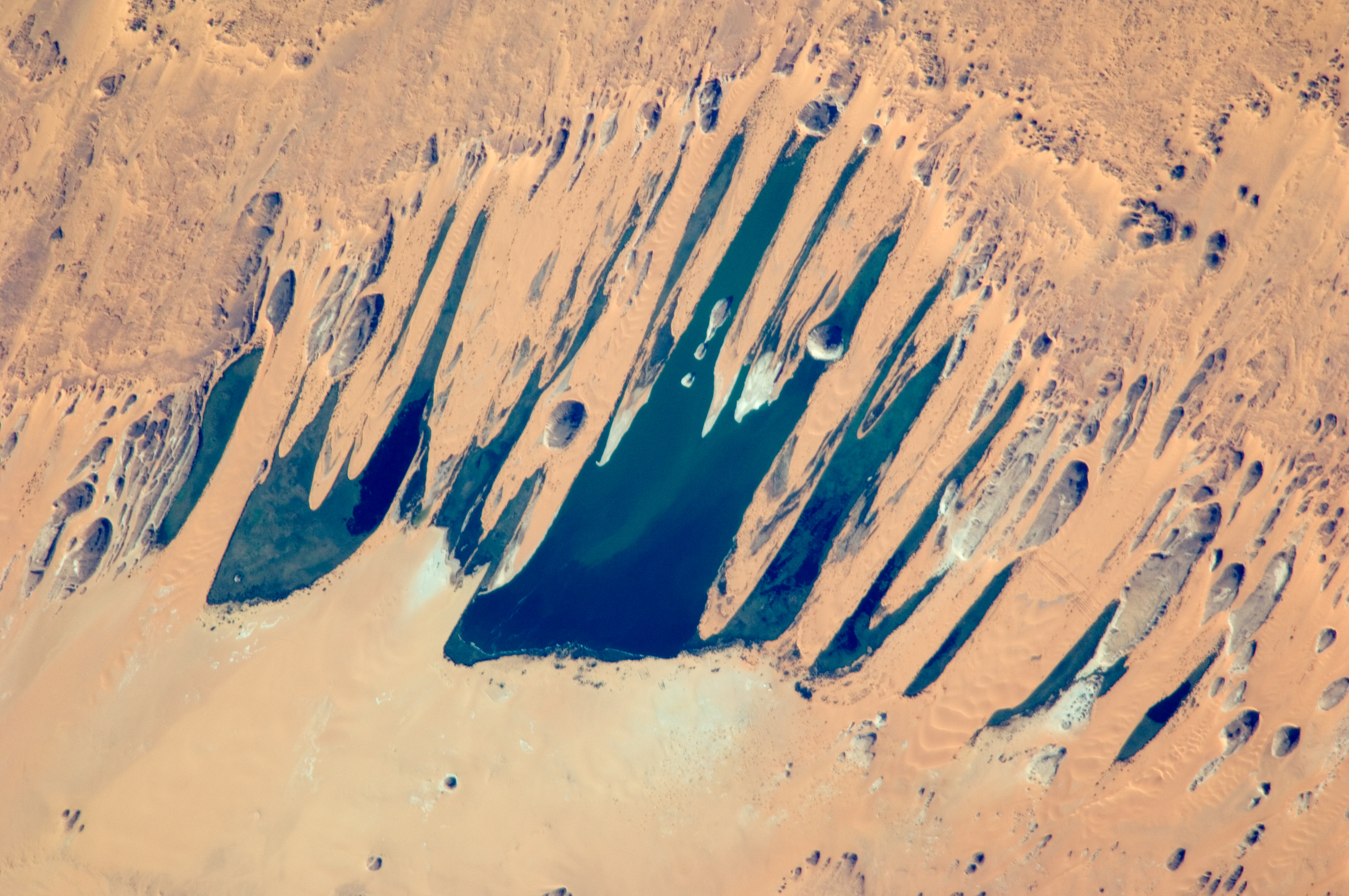
The Lakes of Ounianga are recharged from fossil groundwater that originated partly during the AHP

The increased precipitation recharged aquifers such as the Nubian Sandstone Aquifer; presently, water from this aquifer maintains several lakes in the Sahara, such as the Lakes of Ounianga. Other groundwater systems were active at that time in the Acacus Mountains, Air Mountains, in the Fezzan and elsewhere in Libya and the Sahel. Raised groundwater tables provided water to plants and was discharged in depressions, lakes, springs and valleys, forming widespread carbonate deposits (Note: In the form of calcretes, "lake chalks", rhizoliths, travertines and tufa.) and feeding lakes and wetlands.

The formation of lakes and vegetation reduced the export of dust from the Sahara. This has been recorded in marine cores, including one core where dust export decreased by almost half, and in Italian lakes. In coastal places, such as in Oman, sea level rise also reduced the production of dust. In the Mediterranean, a decreased dust supply was accompanied by increased sediment input from the Nile, leading to changes in marine sediment composition. Conversely, the increased vegetation may have yielded more volatile organic compounds in the air.

Whether the strengthening of the monsoon enhanced or reduced upwelling off Northwestern Africa is debatable, with some research suggesting that the strengthening in upwelling decreased sea surface temperatures and increased the biological productivity of the sea, while other research suggests that the opposite occurred; less upwelling with more moisture. However, regardless of whether upwelling increased or decreased, it is possible that the strengthening of the monsoon boosted productivity off the coasts of Northern and Western Africa because the increased river discharge delivered more nutrients to the sea. The decline of dust input may have caused the cessation of deep-water coral growth in the eastern Atlantic during the AHP by starving them of nutrients.

=== Arabia ===
Precipitation in Dhofar and southwestern Arabia is brought by the African monsoon, and a change to a wetter climate resembling Africa has been noted in southern Arabia and Socotra from cave and river deposits. It possibly reached as far as Qatar. Holocene paleolakes are recorded at Tayma, Jubbah, in the Wahiba Sands of Oman and at Mundafan. In the Rub al-Khali lakes formed between 9,000 and 7,000 years ago and dunes were stabilized by vegetation, although the formation of lakes there was less pronounced than in the Pleistocene. One of these lakes eventually overflowed to produce an outburst flood north of the Rub al-Khali. The Wadi ad-Dawasir river system in central Saudi Arabia became active again with increased river runoff into the Persian Gulf. Wadis in Oman eroded across LGM dunes and formed accumulation terraces. Episodes of increased river discharge occurred in Yemen and increased precipitation is recorded in the caves of Hoti, Qunf in Oman, Mukalla in Yemen and Hoq Cave in Socotra. Increased precipitation resulted in increased groundwater flow, generating groundwater-fed lakes and carbonate deposits.

Forests and wildfire activity expanded across parts of Arabia. Freshwater sources in Arabia during the AHP became focus points of human activity, and herding activity between mountains and lowlands occurred. In addition, karstic activity took place on exposed coral reefs in the Red Sea and traces of it are still recognizable today. Increased precipitation has been also invoked to explain decreased salinities in the Red Sea, increased sedimentation and increased river inflow, while dust input decreased. Rock art depicts wildlife that existed in Arabia during the humid period. The Arabian neolithic coincides with the humid period, with archaeological sites such as cairns appearing with its beginning, and settlement of southern Mesopotamia during the Ubaid period may coincide with the wet epoch.

The humid period in Arabia did not last as long as in Africa, deserts did not retreat as much and precipitation may not have reached the central and northern part of the peninsula past Oman and the Yemen Highlands; northern Arabia remained somewhat drier than southern Arabia, droughts were still common and the land and still produced dust. One study has estimated that the amount of rainfall in the Red Sea did increase to no more than 1 metre per year (39 in/year). Whether some former lakes in Arabia were actually marshes is contentious.

=== East Africa ===
Nile discharge was higher than today and during the early African humid period, the Nile in Egypt flooded up to 3–5 metres (9.8–16.4 ft) higher than it did recently before flood control. The increased flooding may have turned the Nile Delta and Nile Valley marshy and inhospitable and could explain why many archaeological sites along the Nile were abandoned during the AHP, with violent conflicts taking place at Jebel Sahaba archaeological site. Early after the Younger Dryas, the Blue Nile would have been the major source of waters for the Nile. Waters from the Nile (Note: Local runoff contributed to the filling of the Fayum Depression.) filled depressions like the Fayum Depression to form a deep lake with anoxic bottom waters and reaching 20 metres (66 ft) above sea level, probably once a geomorphic barrier was breached. Wetlands and anastomosing channels developed in the Nile Delta as sediment supply increased. In addition, Nile tributaries in northwestern Sudan such as Wadi Al-Malik, Wadi Howar (Note: Also known as the Yellow Nile.) and Valley of the Queens became active during the AHP and contributed sediments to the Nile. Wadi Howar was active until 4,500 years ago, and at the time often contained dune-dammed lakes, swamps and wetlands; it was the largest Saharan tributary of the Nile and constituted an important pathway into sub-Saharian Africa. Conversely it appears that Lake Victoria and Lake Albert were not overflowing into the White Nile for all of the AHP, and the White Nile would have been sustained by overflow from Lake Turkana. There appears to be a tendency over the course of the AHP for the discharge of the Blue Nile to decrease relative to that of the White Nile. The Blue Nile built an alluvial fan at its confluence with the White Nile, and incision by the Nile reduced flooding risk in some areas which thus became available for human use.

Some lakes formed or expanded during the African humid period

Closed lakes in East Africa rose, sometimes by hundreds of metres. Lake Suguta developed in the Suguta Valley, accompanied by the formation of river deltas where rivers such as the Baragoi River entered the lake. In turn, Lake Suguta overflowed into the Kerio River, this adding water to Lake Turkana where increased discharge by the Turkwel River led to the formation of a large river delta. The Omo River remained its principal inflow but the relative role of other water sources increased compared to present-day conditions. A 45 metres (148 ft) deep lake filled the Chew Bahir basin and together with Lakes Chamo and Abaya formed a river system flowing into Lake Turkana, which itself overflowed on its northwestern side through the Lotikipi Swamp into the White Nile. Deposits from this lake highstand form the Galana Boi Formation. The increased water depth reduced water mixing in Lake Turkana, allowing organic material to build up. This overflowing large lake was filled with freshwater and was populated by humans, typically in bays, along capes and protected shorelines; the societies there engaged in fishery but could probably also fall back on other resources in the region.

The Ethiopian Lake Abhe expanded to cover an area of 6,000 square kilometres (2,300 sq mi), much larger than the present-day lake, in the "Abhe IV"–"Abhe V" lake cycle. The enlarged lake covered a large area west of the present-day lake, present-day lakes Afambo, Gamari and Tendaho, reducing Borawli, Dama Ale and Kurub to islands, and possibly overflowed to the Red Sea. The maximum water level was reached during the early Holocene as river discharge increased, but was later limited by partial overflow and did not rise above 380 metres (1,250 ft) again. Deep thermal groundwater recharge occurred in the region. About 9,000 years of human occupation are documented at the lake. Archaeological sites indicate that people obtained resources from the lake and followed its rise and decline. The cultural traditions at Lake Abhe appear to be unusual by AHP/African standards.

Lake Zway and Lake Shala in Ethiopia joined with Lake Abiyata and Lake Langano to form a large waterbody which began overflowing into the Awash River. Nearly all lakes in the East African Rift were affected by the AHP: Lake Ashenge and Lake Hayq also in Ethiopia, Lake Bogoria, Lake Naivasha and Lake Nakuru-Lake Elmenteita which merged, all in Kenya, and Lake Masoko in Tanzania. Lakes formed in the caldera of the Menengai volcano and in the Chalbi region east of Lake Turkana; the lake covered an area of about 10,000 square kilometres (3,900 sq mi). A 1,600 square kilometres (620 sq mi) large and 50 metres (160 ft) deep Lake Magadi formed in the early Holocene, generating the "High Magadi Beds" sediments. This lake was fed by now-dry waterfalls and possibly from the neighbouring lake Koora. In the Danakil Depression of Ethiopia freshwater conditions became established. Lakes formed in depressions on the mountains around Lake Kivu. Some of these lakes became connected through overflow: Lake Nakuru-Elmenteita drained northward through the Menengai caldera, Baringo-Bogoria (Note: Assuming that they merged, which is not clearly established. Tectonic or geographic changes may have been necessary to establish a connection. Alternatively, water might have bypassed Baringo.) Suguta into Lake Turkana and from there into the Nile, carving gorges along the way. Lake Naivasha drained south through Lake Siriata into Lake Magadi-Natron. Overflow of several of these lakes allowed animals, including Nile crocodiles and fish, to propagate to the individual lake basins, but at the same time hindered the propagation of many land-based mammals. River systems in the southern Kenya Rift region became active.

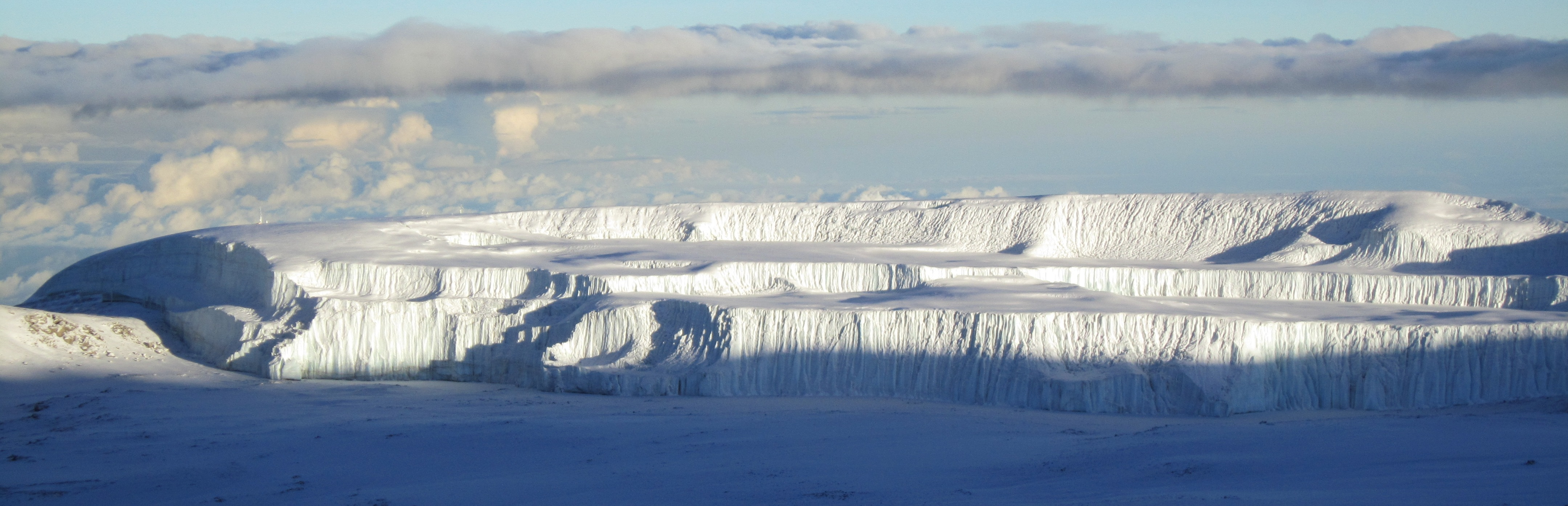
A glacier on Mount Kilimanjaro. The oldest now present ice of Kilimanjaro formed during the African humid period

Glaciers stopped retreating or briefly expanded in East Africa at the beginning of the AHP before continuing retreat. On Mount Kilimanjaro they may have expanded during the AHP after a phase during the Younger Dryas where the mountain was ice free, but the tree line also rose at that time, accompanied by soil formation. The wetter climate may have destabilized the neighbouring Mount Meru volcano, causing a giant landslide that removed its summit. In the Rwenzori Mountains, increased precipitation during the AHP has been linked to the occurrence of rockfalls.

Erosion in catchments of East Africa increased with the beginning of the humid period but then decreased even before its end, as the increased weathering led to the formation of soils, these in turn to the establishment of a vegetation cover that subsequently reduced additional erosion. Increased weathering resulted in the increased consumption of atmospheric CO_{2} during the AHP.

Surprisingly, and contrary to the patterns expected from precessional changes, the East African Rift also experienced a wetter climates during the AHP, reaching as far south as Lake Rukwa (Note: Which overflowed through the Ifume River into Lake Tanganyika.) and Lake Cheshi into the Southern Hemisphere. In the region of the African Rift Valley and African Great Lakes, pollen evidence points to the occurrence of forests including rainforest vegetation due to the increased precipitation, while today they occur only in limited areas there. Denser vegetation also occurred at Lake Turkana, with wooden vegetation covering almost half of the dry land although grasslands remained dominant. Development of forest vegetation around the African Great Lakes created an interconnected environment where species spread, increasing biodiversity with effects on the future when the environment became fragmented. Vegetation cover also increased in the Afar region and Ericaceae plants spread at high elevations. Forests and moisture-requiring vegetation expanded in the Bale Mountains. Different types of vegetation, including dryland vegetation, existed at Lake Malawi and Lake Tanganyika however, and vegetation did not change much. The wetter climate led to the formation of the Halalee paleosoil in the Afar region and decreased wildfire activity in the Rwenzori.

In East Africa, the AHP led to improved environmental conditions for food and water supplies, allowing early human populations to survive, grow, and settle in new regions without requiring major changes in food-gathering strategies. Pottery techniques such as the "dotted wavy line" and "Kanysore" are associated with fishing and foraging communities. In Somalia, the "Bardaale" lithic industry is linked to the AHP. Earlier wet and dry periods in East Africa may have influenced the evolution of humans and allowed their spread across the Sahara and into Europe. Animal species took advantage too, with midge populations increasing in Lake Victoria.

=== Other parts of Africa and the rainforest realm ===
Lake Bosumtwi in Ghana rose during the AHP. (Note: A lake level drop 8,000 years ago has been related to the northward movement of the rainbelt.) Evidence there also suggests a decrease in wildfire activity took place. Tropical forests expanded in Cameroon Highlands and the Adamawa Plateau of Cameroon and moved upward at Lake Bambili also in Cameroon, causing an upward shift of afromontane vegetation. The core of the rainforest was probably unaltered by the African humid period, perhaps with some changes in species and an expansion of their area. There is some evidence that an "Equatorial humid period", mechanistically linked to equatorial insolation and extending into the Amazon, may have taken place in the eastern Congo region at the same time as the AHP or around its beginning and end. The peatlands of Central Congo started developing during the African humid period and peat continues to accumulate there to this day, albeit with a slowdown in the Cuvette Centrale after the end of the African humid period. In the Gulf of Guinea, increased sedimentation and changed sedimentation patterns from increased river runoff decreased the activity of submarine cold seeps offshore present-day Nigeria.

On São Nicolau and Brava in the Cape Verde Islands, precipitation and erosion increased. In the Canary Islands, there is evidence of a moister climate on Fuerteventura, La Gomera and Tenerife, the laurel forests changed perhaps as a consequence of the AHP. Recharge of groundwater levels have been inferred from Gran Canaria also in the Canary Islands, followed by a decrease after the end of the AHP. Choughs may have reached the Canary Islands from North Africa when the latter was wetter.

=== Levant and Mediterranean ===
High-latitude Africa has not undergone large-scale changes in the past 11,700 years; the Atlas Mountains may have blocked the monsoon from expanding farther north. However, soil and tufa, river valley and cave deposits showing a moister climate in southern Morocco, increased precipitation in the Algerian highlands, vegetation changes in the Middle Atlas, several floods in Tunisian rivers and ecosystem changes which impacted steppe-dependent rodents of Northern Africa have been linked to the AHP.

In the Pleistocene and Holocene humidity in the Mediterranean is often correlated to humidity in the Sahara, and the early-mid Holocene climate of Iberia, Italy, Negev and Northern Africa was wetter than today; in Sicily wettening correlates with ITCZ changes in Northern Africa. Mediterranean precipitation is brought by Mediterranean cyclones and the westerlies; either increased precipitation from the westerlies, northward moisture transport from Africa or monsoonal precipitation extending into the Mediterranean may have rendered it wetter. While it is established, the nature of the connection between the African Monsoon and Mediterranean precipitation is unclear and it was winter rainfall that increased predominantly, although separating monsoonal and non-monsoonal precipitation can be difficult.

The Mediterranean Sea became less saline during the AHP, in part due to increased precipitation from the westerlies but also from increased river discharge in Africa, leading to the formation of sapropel layers when the increased runoff led to the Mediterranean becoming more stratified (Note: Which would prevent oxygen-rich waters from sinking to the deep ocean in winter, suffocating organisms on the seafloor.) and eutrophied, with changes in the main water masses of the sea. The S1 sapropel layer is specifically associated with the AHP and with increased discharge of the Nile and other African rivers. These processes together with decreased dust transport by wind led to changes in the sediment patterns of the Mediterranean, and increased marine nutrient availability and food web productivity in the Mediterranean, which impacted the development of deep-sea corals.

In the Levant, wetter conditions during the AHP are recorded from Jeita Cave in Lebanon, Soreq Cave in Israel and desert varnish in the Negev, while the Dead Sea has variously been reported to have grown or shrunk during the AHP. Such a decline, if it took place, and declines in other southern European lakes were low during this period. This is unlike some earlier wet periods in the Sahara, and whether the monsoon reached the southern Levant region during the AHP or there was increased winter precipitation is contentious. The northern Mediterranean may have been drier, with more wildfire activity, during the AHP, but increased summer precipitation in the European Alps has been associated with the AHP.

=== Southern Africa ===
The effects, if any, of the African humid period on Southern Africa have been unclear. Originally, it was proposed that the orbitally driven changes would imply a dry period in Southern Africa, which would have given way to moister conditions as the northern AHP ended, as the ITCZ should shift its average position between the two hemispheres. However, the lack of paleoclimatology data with sufficient time resolution from Southern Africa has made it difficult to assess the climate there during the AHP. More recently obtained paleoclimate data have suggested however that southern Africa was actually wetter during the AHP rather than drier, reaching as far as Rodrigues Island in the Indian Ocean and as far as the catchment of the Orange River. The area between Lake Tanganyika and Lake Malawi has been interpreted as the limit of the AHP's influence.

Conversely, and consistent with the opposite reaction pattern of the Southern Hemisphere, the Zambezi River reached its lowest discharge during the AHP, and precipitation in the Central African Plateau and Zambia decreases in computer simulations of a Green Sahara. Thus, the AHP may not have reach southern or southeastern Africa. There may have been opposite changes in precipitation between southeast Africa and tropical East Africa, separated by a "hinge zone". Particular changes occurred in central southern Africa, where a dry period co-occurred with an expansion of Lake Makgadikgadi; presumably the lake during this dry interval was nourished by increased wetness over the Okavango River catchment in the Angolan Highlands due to the AHP; peatlands formed in Angola during the AHP. In general there is little consistency between Northern and Southern Africa in terms of hydrological changes during the Holocene, and nowhere are both the start and end of the AHP apparent. Orbitally-mediated changes in Northern Hemisphere climate affected the Southern Hemisphere through oceanic pathways involving sea surface temperatures. Additionally, wetter periods unrelated to the AHP may have occurred after deglaciation in Southern Africa.

=== Numerical estimates ===
Estimates of the exact amount of increased precipitation vary widely. During the African humid period, Saharan rainfall increased to 300–400 millimetres per year (12–16 in/year), and values exceeding 400 millimetres per year (16 in/year) may have spread to 19–21° northern latitude. In the eastern Sahara, a gradient from 200 millimetres per year (7.9 in/year) increment in the north to 500 millimetres per year (20 in/year) in the south has been identified. An area with less than 100 millimetres per year (3.9 in/year) may have remained in the Eastern Sahara; however, although its driest parts may have received 20-fold more precipitation than today. Precipitation in the Sahara probably reached no more than 500 millimetres per year (20 in/year), with large uncertainty.

Other reconstructions indicate an annual increase of about 150–320 millimetres (5.9–12.6 in) in Africa, with strong regional variation. From lake levels and other proxies, precipitation increases of 20–33%, 25–40%/23-45% or 50–100%/40–150% have been inferred for East Africa, with an increase of 40% reconstructed for Northern Africa. In the early Holocene, there appears to have been an eastward- and northward-decreasing trend of humidity. Additionally, at Tayma in Arabia a threefold increase appears to have occurred and precipitation in the Wahiba Sands of Oman may have reached 250–500 millimetres per year (9.8–19.7 in/year).

=== Effect on other climate modes ===
The El Niño–Southern Oscillation is a major mode of climate variability. Paleoclimatology records from Ecuador and the Pacific Ocean indicate that during the early and middle Holocene ENSO variability was suppressed by about 30–60%, which can be only partially explained through orbital forcing. The Green Sahara may have suppressed ENSO activity, forcing a La Niña–like climate state, in one climate model this is accompanied by decreased upwelling and deepening of the thermocline in the Eastern Pacific as the Walker circulation expands westward. Easterly winds in the western Pacific Ocean increase, while they decrease in the eastern. In addition, Atlantic Niño sea surface temperature patterns develop in the Atlantic Ocean and the South Atlantic High weakens while the circulation of the South Atlantic Ocean changes. However, the existence of serious model bias in the depictions of the equatorial Atlantic sea surface temperatures is a problem for simulations of its past climate and the Atlantic Niño state may only occur during marginal AHP conditions, being suppressed during its maximum. The Green Sahara may also induce a negative Pacific Decadal Oscillation pattern in the North Pacific, but without the corresponding precipitation changes in North America. (Note: While the source credits Sahara greening for mid-Holocene drying in the southwestern USA, the supplementary data do not indicate such a pattern in most models, or show that non-Sahara vegetation changes are responsible for the drying tendency. Studies often use vegetation changes in the entire Northern Hemisphere to infer their teleconnections, but the effects of vegetation changes in different regions may be distinct.)

Remote effects of the AHP on climate have also been studied, although many changes are model-dependent and may be inaccurate due to misrepresentations of atmospheric dust distribution. Whether the reduced albedo of the Sahara during the AHP contributed to, or increased cloud cover counteracted, the warming of the Holocene thermal maximum is model-dependent; dust changes did not have a major effect. The AHP would also influence SSTs in the Indian Ocean, although there is not much evidence about the mid-Holocene sea temperatures there.

The AMOC transports heat from the Southern into the Northern Hemisphere and is implicated in starting the Holocene AHP an earlier AHPs after the end of an ice age. Various studies have been conducted to determine which effects reduced dust supply and the greening of the Sahara would have had on its intensity, with conflicting results on which effects would predominate. Increased heat transport either through the atmosphere or the ocean would result in warming in the Arctic.

Gaetani et al. (2024) found that Green Sahara climate simulations feature warming throughout the Northern Hemisphere and a strengthening of the westerlies and their precipitation in the Atlantic but a decline along the North American West Coast. There are also changes in the North Atlantic Oscillation during winter. The simulated temperature patterns, however, only poorly match temperature reconstructions.

==== Remote precipitation and the AHP ====
The Sahara greening intensified the Indian and Asian monsoons, warming and increased precipitation across most of the Tibetan Plateau especially late in the monsoon season, and climate simulations including a green Sahara reproduce the reconstructed palaeoclimates there better than these without. In a climate model, there is a shift in precipitation from snow to rain. The strengthened and expanding monsoons of Africa and Asia alter the atmospheric circulation of the planet, inducing a northward-shifted and wetter East Asian Monsoon and drying across tropical South America and central-eastern North America. In East Asia, a strengthened anticyclone over the West Pacific delivers more moisture to northeastern China and Indochina, and less to central and south-eastern China. The reduced dust emission warms the North Atlantic and increases westerly flow into the North American Monsoon, strengthening it. The far-field precipitation changes reach as far as Europe and Australia. Discrepancies between modelled and reconstructed northward extension and precipitation in the Asian monsoon regions and the North American Monsoon area may be explained through these remote effects.

Sun et al. (2020) proposed that the greening of the Sahara during the AHP can increase precipitation over the Middle East even if neither the African nor the Indian monsoons reach it. During spring, the increased vegetation forces anomalous atmospheric circulations that direct moisture transport from the Mediterranean, the Red Sea, and eastern tropical Africa into the Middle East, increasing precipitation and agricultural productivity there. This could explain increased precipitation in the Middle East during the AHP: A wet climate occurred in the Middle East during the early Holocene, leading to the Ubaid period of settlement in Mesopotamia, followed by dry phases around 5,500 years ago and a concomitant reduction in simulated wheat yield.

==== Hurricanes and the AHP ====
One climate model has indicated that a greener Sahara and reduced dust output would have increased tropical cyclone activity, especially over the Atlantic but also in most other tropical cyclone basins. (Note: Except for most of the Western North Pacific according to Pausata et al. 2017.) Changes in the intensity of the storms, decreases in wind shear, changes in atmospheric circulation and less dust in the atmosphere, which results in warmer oceans, are responsible for this phenomenon, while tropical wave activity may have increased or decreased. The net effect could be a global increase in tropical cyclone activity, a westward shift within the ocean basins and in the Atlantic Ocean a shift towards later dates. While there are no good paleotempestology data for the time of the African humid period that could confirm or refute this theory and many of these records are specific for particular locations, hurricane activity including past strikes in Puerto Rico and in Vieques appear to correlate with the strength of the West African Monsoon and increased precipitation on the northern Yucatan Peninsula during the middle Holocene could be explained by increased hurricane activity during the AHP. On the other hand, at Grand Bahama Bank and the Dry Tortugas of South Florida a decrease of hurricane activity took place during the AHP and dust emission is not always anti-correlated to hurricane activity. Finally, the northward movement of the ITCZ during the AHP may have caused a corresponding northward movement of tropical cyclogenesis areas and storm tracks in the Atlantic Ocean, which could also explain decreased hurricane activity in the Bahamas and Dry Tortugas.

== Fluctuations ==
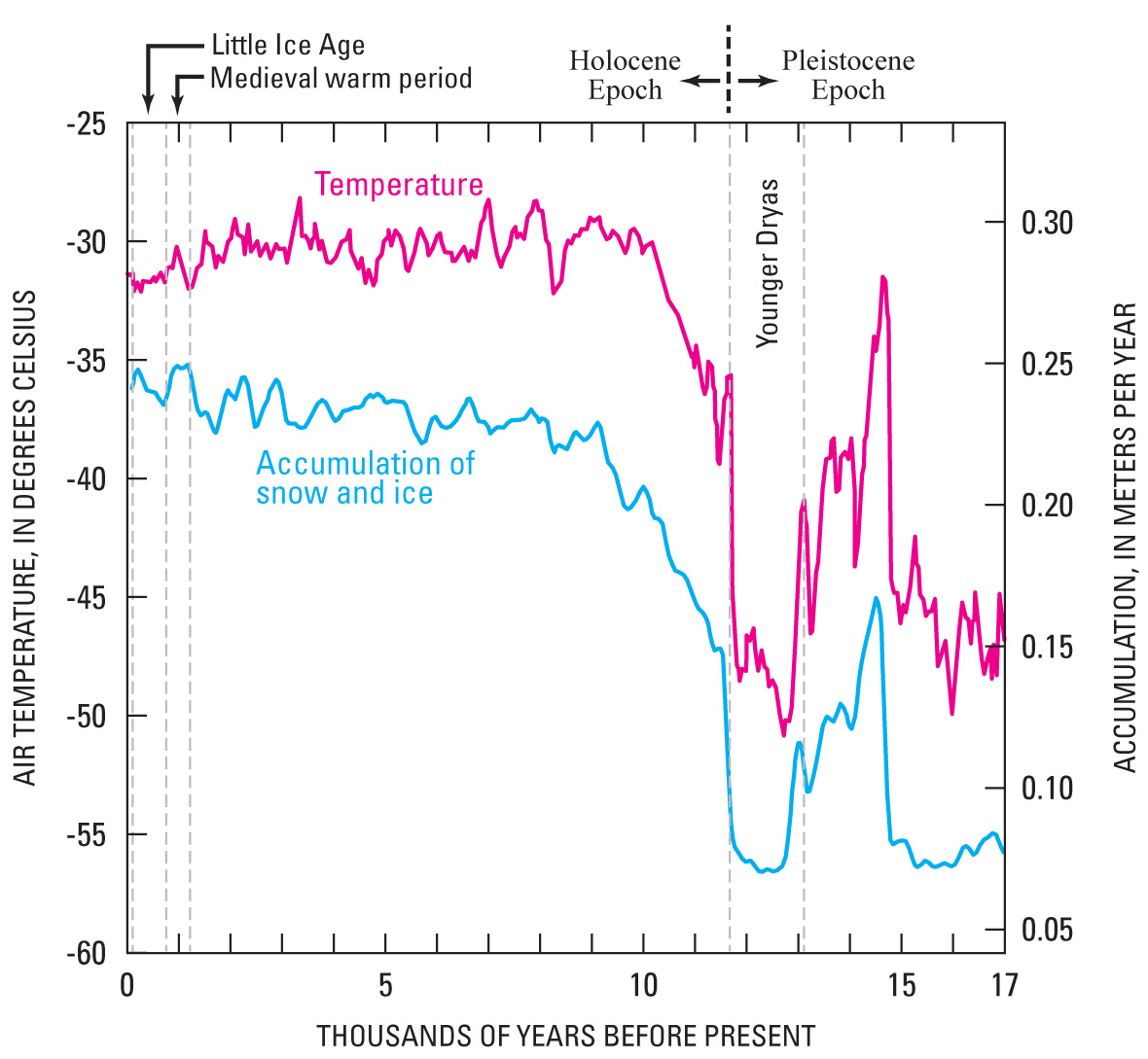
Temperatures in Greenland during the Younger Dryas

Climate variability during the AHP is poorly documented, but some periods of reduced precipitation occurred during the late glacial and the Holocene. During the Younger Dryas 12,500–11,500 years ago, the North Atlantic and Europe became much colder again and there was a phase of drought in the area of the African humid period, extending over both East Africa, (Note: There is conflicting evidence on whether the Younger Dryas was wetter or drier in tropical southeastern Africa.) where lake levels dropped in eastern Africa, southern Africa, equatorial Africa and West Africa. The dry interval extended to India and the Mediterranean where dune activity occurred in the Negev. At the end of the Younger Dryas, precipitation, lake levels, and river runoff increased again, although south of the equator the return of humid conditions was slower than the relatively abrupt change to its north.

Another dry phase took place about 8,200 years ago, spanning East Africa and Northern Africa (Note: Whether it also took place in Asia is unclear; perhaps it was too short to trigger climate changes recognizable in records but some evidence has been found.) as documented by various lines of evidence such as decreased water levels in lakes. It coincided with cooling in the Northern Atlantic, in surrounding landmasses such as Greenland and around the world; the drought may be related to the 8.2 kiloyear event which separates the Greenlandian and Northgrippian stages of the Holocene and lasted for about one millennium. The 8,200 year event has also been noted in the Maghreb, where it is associated with a transition of the Capsian culture as well as with cultural changes both in the Sahara and the Mediterranean; at the Gobero cemetery a population change occurred after this dry interruption but the occurrence of widespread cultural changes appears to be questionable. This episode appears to have been caused by the draining of ice-dammed lakes in North America although a low latitude origin has also been suggested.

Cooling of the Northern Atlantic during Heinrich event 1 and the Younger Dryas, associated with a weaker Atlantic meridional overturning circulation, leads to atmospheric pressure anomalies that shift the African Easterly Jet and precipitation belts southward, making Northern Africa drier. Storm tracks shift north away from the Mediterranean. Earlier Heinrich events were also accompanied by drought in North Africa. Likewise, a weakening of moisture transport and a less eastward position of the Congo Air Boundary contributed to reducing precipitation in East Africa although some parts of southern Africa at Lake Malawi were wetter during the Younger Dryas.

Many humidity fluctuations in the early Holocene appear to be caused by the discharge of meltwater from the Laurentide Ice Sheet into the Atlantic, which weakens the Atlantic meridional overturning circulation. Some dry periods in marine cores in the Gulf of Guinea appear to coincide with events recorded in Greenland ice cores. Other variations in precipitation observed in records have been attributed to solar activity changes, water levels of Lake Turkana, for example, appear to reflect the 11-year solar cycle.

In Lake Turkana, water level fluctuations took place between 8,500 and 4,500 years before present, with highstands before 8,400, around 7,000, and between 5,500 and 5,000 and lowstands around 8,000, 10,000 and 12,000 years before present. In total, five or six separate highstands are recorded in desert varnish around the lake, matching with phases of increased wetness in the Negev. The highstands appear to be controlled by sea surface temperature patterns in the Atlantic and Indian Oceans, but also by overflow of water from Lake Suguta and Chew Bahir and upstream lakes into Lake Turkana. Volcanic and tectonic phenomena occur at Lake Turkana, but do not have the magnitude required to explain large changes in lake level. Water level fluctuations have also been inferred for Lake Chad on the basis of pollen data, especially towards the end of the AHP. In the Taoudenni lake fluctuations of about a quarter-millennium have been recorded and frequent droughts occurred in the Eastern Sahara.

Other variations appear to have occurred 9,500–9,000 and 7,400–6,800 as well as 10,200, 8,200, 6,600 and 6,000 years before present; they were accompanied by decreased population density in parts of the Sahara, and other dry interludes in Egypt have been noted 9,400–9,300, 8,800–8,600, 7,100–6,900 and 6,100–5,900 years ago. The duration and severity of dry events are difficult to reconstruct, and the impact of events such as the Younger Dryas is heterogeneous even across neighbouring areas. During dry episodes, humans might have headed to waterbodies which still had resources, and cultural changes in the central Sahara have been linked to some dry episodes. Aside from fluctuations, a decrease in Nile discharge and southward retreat of the humid period may have been underway after 8,000 years ago with a major drought around 7,800 years ago.

== End ==
The African humid period ended about 6,000–5,000 years ago; an ending date of 5,500 years before present is often used. After vegetation declined, the Sahara became barren and was claimed by sand. Wind erosion increased in northern Africa, and dust export from the now-desert and from dried up lakes such as the Bodélé Basin grew; Bodélé today is the largest single source of dust on Earth. The lakes dried up, mesic vegetation disappeared, and sedentary human populations were replaced by more mobile cultures. The transition from the "green Sahara" to the present-day dry Sahara is considered to be the greatest environmental transition of the Holocene in northern Africa; today almost no precipitation falls in the region. The end of the AHP but also its beginning could be considered a "climate crisis" given the strong and extended impact. Drying extended as far as the Azores, Canary Islands and southeastern Iran, and there is evidence of climate change on São Nicolau, Cape Verde.

The Piora Oscillation cold period in the Alps coincides with the end of the AHP; the period 5,600–5,000 years ago was characterized by widespread cooling and more variable precipitation changes around the world and was possibly forced by changes in solar activity and orbital parameters. It has also been named "Mid-Holocene Transition". Some changes in climate possibly extended into southeastern Australia, Central America and into South America. The neoglacial began. In the Chew Bahir basin, several short droughts may have "heralded" the end of the AHP; such short-term climatic fluctuations are common before a major climatic change.

A major pan-tropical environmental change took place about 4,000 years ago. This change was accompanied by the collapse of ancient civilizations, severe drought in Africa, Asia, and the Middle East, and the retreat of glaciers on Mount Kilimanjaro and Mount Kenya.

=== Chronology ===
Whether the drying happened everywhere at the same time and whether it took place in centuries or millennia is unclear in part due to disagreeing records and has led to controversy, and such a disagreement on timing also exists with respect to the expected vegetation changes. Marine cores usually indicates an abrupt change but not without exceptions while pollen data do not, perhaps due to regional and local differences in vegetation. Africa is a diverse landscape and groundwater and local vegetation can modify local conditions; groundwater-fed water bodies, for example, persisted longer than those nourished by rain. The debate on how quickly the Sahara formed goes back to 1849, when the Prussian naturalist Alexander von Humboldt suggested that only a quick drying could form the desert.

In the 2010s, the idea has taken hold that the end of the African humid period occurred in a stepwise fashion from north to south. In northeastern Asia, the western Sahara and east Africa, the humid period ended within 500 years with a one-step drying 6,000 – 5,000 years ago north of the present-day monsoon belt. Farther south, precipitation decrease was more protracted and closer to the equator, the AHP ended between 4,000 and 2,500 years ago. In East Africa, pronounced drying occurred between 4,500 and 3,500 years ago, centered on 4,000 years ago; Egypt during the Old Kingdom was still wetter than today. A later end in northeast Africa about 4,000 years ago may reflect the different configuration of landmasses and thus monsoon behaviour, while other research has found a westward propagating drying trend. An earlier end by 6,100 years ago has also been suggested.

Some evidence points to a two-phase change in climate, with two distinct dry transitions caused by two distinct steps in the decrease in insolation at which climate changes. Distinct environmental changes may have occurred in Central, Western, and Eastern Africa. In Asia, an abrupt drying has been noted in numerous Chinese lakes. Finally, sometimes the 4.2 kiloyear event – the transition from the Northgrippian to the Meghalayan stage of the Holocene – is considered to be the true end of the AHP, especially in central Africa.

Increased variability in precipitation may have preceded the end of the AHP; this pattern is commonly observed before a sudden climate change. In Gilf Kebir, between 6,300 and 5,200 years ago apparently a winter rainfall regime became established as the AHP ended. Later fluctuations in climate that produced brief humid spells also took place, such as moister periods 2,100 years before present in the western Sahel, between 2,200 - 1,500 years ago in Ethiopia and between 500 BCE – 300 CE in Roman Northern Africa and along the Dead Sea. By 2,700 years ago, the central Sahara had become a desert and remained one until the present day.

=== Sahara and Sahel ===
After a first brief lake level drop between 5,700 and 4,700 calibrated years ago that might reflect climate variability towards the end of the African humid period, water levels in Lake Megachad decreased quickly after 5,200 years before present. It shrank to about 5% of its former size, with the deeper northern Bodele basin drying up entirely about 2,000–1,000 years ago as it was disconnected from the southern basin where its major tributary, the Chari River, enters Lake Chad. The dried out basin was now exposed to the Harmattan winds, which blow dust out of the dry lake bed, making it the single largest source of dust in the world. Dunes formed in the dried-up Sahara and Sahel or began moving again after stabilizing during the AHP.

The tropical vegetation was replaced by desert vegetation, in some places suddenly and in others more gradually. Along the Atlantic coast, the vegetation retreat was slowed by a stage of sea level rise that increased soil moisture levels, delaying the retreat by about two millennia. A gradual decline has been noted in the Tibesti. In Libya at Wadi Tanezzuft, the end of the humid period was also delayed by leftover water in dune systems and in the Tassili mountains until 2,700 years ago, when river activity finally ceased. A brief moist pulse between 5,000 – 4,000 years ago in the Tibesti led to the development of the so-called "Lower Terrace". The Egyptian Sahara might still have been vegetated until 4,200 years ago, based on depictions of savanna environments in Fifth Dynasty tombs in Egypt.

At Lake Yoa, which is groundwater-fed, vegetation decreased and the desert took over between 4,700–4,300 and 2,700 years ago, while the lake became hypersaline 4,000 years ago. Lake Teli dried out completely about 4,200 years ago. However, the climate of the Ounianga lakes may have been affected by the Tibesti Mountains and the end of the AHP, thus delayed, and fossil groundwater left by the AHP nourishes the lake to this day. In the central Sahara, water resources in the mountains persisted longer.

=== East Africa and Arabia ===
In northern East Africa, water levels dropped rapidly about 5,500 years ago, while in Hoti Cave in Arabia, the Indian Monsoon retreated southward about 5,900 years ago. Drying is also documented from Oman, and rivers and lakes of Arabia became intermittent or entirely dry. The Blue Nile basin became less moist with a noticeable decrease of Nile discharge about 4,000 years ago. Decreased discharge of the Nile led to the cessation of sapropel deposition and turbidite activity off its delta, the concentration/ abandonment of river channels in its delta and upstream and increased seawater influence in the delta.

Reconstructions from Lake Abiyata in Ethiopia suggest that the end of the African humid period took the form of severe droughts rather than a gradual decrease of precipitation. Drying in Arabia commenced about 7,000 calibrated years ago and there are large disparities in the timing between various parts of Arabia but a tendency towards an arid climate between 7,000 and 5,000 years ago has been observed which continued until 2,700 years ago. In the Bale Mountains and the Sanetti Plateau of Ethiopia, vegetation changes signalling a drier climate occurred around 4,600 years ago.

Forest cover in the area of the African Great Lakes decreased between 4,700 and 3,700 years ago, although drying at Lake Rukwa began 6,700 years ago and transition to saline conditions took place 5,500 years ago. At Lake Edward, major changes in lake chemistry consistent with drying are noted 5,200 years ago. There was a minor recovery in vegetation between 2,500 and 2,000 years ago, followed by a much more rapid appearance of grasses, accompanied by substantial wildfire activity. This might have been the most severe drought in the Lake Edward region during the Holocene, with many lakes, such as Lake George, dropping significantly or drying up altogether. Other lakes such as Nakuru, Turkana, Lake Chew Bahir, Lake Abbe and Lake Zway also dropped between 5,400 and 4,200 years ago. Decreased vegetation cover in the catchment of the Blue Nile has been correlated with increased sediment transport in the river beginning 3,600 – 4,000 years ago. 5,000 years ago, Lake Nabugabo separated from Lake Victoria owing to decreasing water levels. The expansion of savanna in East Africa has been linked to the end of the AHP.

The end of the AHP at Lake Turkana occurred about 5,000–5,300 years before present, accompanied by a lake level decline and the cessation of overflow from other lakes in its area into Lake Turkana. Between 5,000 and 4,200, Lake Turkana became more saline; its water levels decreased below the level of outflow to the Nile. Towards the end of the AHP water temperatures in the lake and in other regional lakes appear to have increased, followed by a drop after its end possibly resulting from the insolation seasonality pattern that was in force at the time of the end of the AHP. The decrease in water level was accompanied by a decrease in sedimentation rates, and there is evidence that faulting and volcanism may have increased at Turkana due to the water level drop. The decrease of water levels in Lake Turkana also impacted the Nile and the Predynastic societies dependent on it.

=== Mediterranean ===
The southern Aegean, Libya and the Middle Atlas became gradually more dry, and drying in Morocco took place about 6,000 radiocarbon years ago, Drier conditions in Iberia and the Western Mediterranean accompanied the end of the African humid period between 6,000 and 4,000 years ago, perhaps as a consequence of increasingly frequent positive North Atlantic Oscillation episodes and the shift of the ITCZ More complicated changes have been found for the northern margin of the Mediterranean, and winter rainfall increased in the Levant at the end of the AHP. A 4.2 kiloyear event is recorded in dust records from the Mediterranean and might have been caused by changes in the circulation of the Atlantic Ocean.

=== Tropical West Africa ===
In Lake Bosumtwi, the African humid period ended about 3,000 years ago after a brief moistening between 5,410 ± 80 years ago that ended 3,170 ± 70 years ago. These earlier, similar changes in Western Senegal and later, similar changes in the Congo Fan appear to reflect a southward shift of the precipitation zone over time. Some drying occurred simultaneously between the Sahel and the Gulf of Guinea. Some lakes in the Guineo-Congolian region dried out, while others were relatively unaffected.

A general tendency towards a drier climate is observed in West Africa at the end of the AHP. There, dense vegetation thinned progressively between 5,000 and 3,000 years ago, and major perturbations in the vegetation occurred between 4,200 and 2,400 years ago. A brief return of moister conditions took place 4,000 years ago while a substantial dry phase occurred between 3,500 and 1,700 years ago. Aridity became established between 5,200 and 3,600 years ago in the Sahara. In Senegal mangroves collapsed 2,500 years ago, and modern-type vegetation arose about 2,000 years ago, aided by a decrease of sea level after the middle Holocene.

=== Central Africa ===
Farther south at the equator between 6,100 and 3,000 calibrated years before present savannah expanded at the expense of forests, with the transition possibly lasting until 2,500 calibrated years before present; a different time course estimate for the area between 4° southern and 7° northern latitude states that forest cover decreased between 4,500 and 1,300 years ago. In the Adamawa Plateau (Cameroon), the Ubangui Plateau (Central African Republic) and the Cameroon Volcanic Line montane forests disappeared at the end of the African humid period. In the Adamawa Plateau savanna has continuously expanded since 4,000 calibrated years ago. Such a change took also place in Benin and Nigeria between 4,500 and 3,400 calibrated years ago. Climate around the Gulf of Guinea became drier at the end of the AHP, although forests remained stable on Sao Tome. In the Congo Basin, there were changes in the composition and density of the forests rather than their extent, and along the equator precipitation may have increased around 4.2 ka. Many vegetation changes in the tropical regions were probably caused by a longer dry season and perhaps a smaller latitudinal range of the ITCZ.

=== Southern Hemisphere Africa ===
In the Southern Hemisphere, at Lake Malawi, drying began later – 1,000 years before present – as did the African humid period, which there began only about 8,000 years ago. Contrarily, increased water levels in Etosha Pan (Namibia) appear to relate to a southward movement of the ITCZ at the end of the AHP although stalagmite growth data in Dante Cave also in Namibia has been interpreted as indicating a wetter climate during the AHP. Several records indicate that 5,500 years ago, precipitation changed in an east-west dipole-like way with drying in the west and moistening in the east. This pattern was probably driven by shifts in atmospheric moisture transport and of rain belt width.

=== Mechanisms ===
The end of the humid period appears to reflect changes in insolation during the Holocene, as a progressive decrease in summer insolation reduced the insolation gradients between Earth's hemispheres. However, the drying appears to have been much more abrupt than the insolation changes; it is not clear whether non-linear feedbacks led to abrupt changes in climate; it is also unclear whether the process, driven by orbital changes, was abrupt. Also, the Southern Hemisphere warmed, and this resulted in a southward shift of the ITCZ; orbitally-driven insolation has increased over the Holocene in the Southern Hemisphere.

As precipitation decreased, so did vegetation, in turn increasing the albedo and further decreasing precipitation. Furthermore, vegetation may have responded to increased variations in precipitation towards the end of the AHP, although this view has been challenged. This could have directed sudden changes in precipitation, although this view has been cast in doubt by the observation that in many places the end of the African humid period was gradual rather than sudden. Plants at higher and lower latitudes might respond differently to climate change; for example, more diverse plant communities might have slowed down the end of the AHP.

Other proposed mechanisms:

- Decreases in polar insolation through altered cosmic ray fluxes might promote the growth of sea ice and cooling at high latitudes, which in turn result in stronger equator-to-pole temperature gradients, stronger subtropical anticyclones and more intense upwelling in for example the Benguela current.
- Changes in the circulation of high latitude oceans may have played a role, such as the potential occurrence of another meltwater/ice rafting pulse around 5,700 years before present. The decreased insolation during the mid-Holocene may have made the climate system more sensitive to changes, explaining why earlier comparable pulses did not terminate the humid period for good.
- There is evidence that glaciers in Tibet such as at Nanga Parbat expanded during the Holocene, especially towards the end of the AHP. In climate models, increased snow and ice on the Tibetan Plateau can lead to a weakening of the Indian and African monsoons, with the weakening of the former preceding that of the latter by 1,500–2,000 years.
- Decreases in sea surface temperatures of the Indian Ocean may be involved in the drying of East Africa, but there is no agreement on the temperature records from that ocean. Moreover, there is no evidence of temperature changes in the Gulf of Guinea at the critical time that might explain the end of the AHP.
- Additional feedback processes may have included the drying of soils and loss of vegetation after decreased rainfall, which would have led to wind-driven deflation of the soils.
- An expansion of sea ice around Greenland, Ellesmere Island 6,000 and Antarctica about 5,000 calibrated years ago may have provided another positive feedback.
- The expanding dry belt of the Sahara pushed the regions of cyclogenesis in the Mediterranean northwest-northward, resulting in wind changes and precipitation regime changes in parts of Italy.
- Climate change at high latitudes has been proposed as a cause for the end of the AHP. Specifically, about 6,000–5,000 years ago the Arctic became colder, with sea ice expanding, temperatures in Europe and off Northern Africa decreasing and the Atlantic meridional overturning circulation weakening. This cooling tendency may have weakened the Tropical Easterly Jet and thus reduced the amount of precipitation falling over Africa.

The orbitally-induced changes of precipitation may have been modified by the solar cycle; specifically, solar activity maxima during the ending phase of the AHP may have offset the orbital effect and thus stabilized precipitation levels, while solar activity minima compounded the orbital effects and thus induced rapid decreases in water levels of Lake Turkana. At Lake Victoria, on the other hand, solar variations appear to sometimes lead to drought and sometimes lead to wetness, probably due to changes in the ITCZ.

==== Potentially human-mediated changes ====
Major changes in vegetation in East Africa about 2,000 years ago may have been caused by human activity, including large-scale deforestation for iron production during the Iron Age. Similar changes have been observed on the Adamawa Plateau (Cameroon), but later dating of archaeological sites has found no correlation between human expansion in Cameroon and environmental degradation. Similar rainforest degradation across Western African took place between 3,000 and 2,000 years ago and the degradation is also known as "third millennium rainforest crisis". Climate-mediated processes may have increased the impact of land use changes in East Africa. In the Sudanian and Sahelian savannah, on the other hand, human activity seems to have had little impact, and in Central Africa, forest changes were clearly triggered by climate change with little or no evidence of anthropogenic changes. The question has led to intense debate among paleoecologists and archaeologists.

While humans were active in Africa during the end of the African humid period, climate models analyzed by Claussen and colleagues 1999 indicate that its end does not need any human activity as an explanation, although vegetation changes may have been induced by human activity and grazing. Later it was suggested that overgrazing may have triggered the end of the AHP around 5,500 years ago; human influence might explain why the Sahara became a desert without the accompanying onset of an ice age; usually the existence of a Sahara desert is associated with the expansion of high latitude glaciers. Later research has on the contrary suggested that human pastoralism may have actually delayed the end of the AHP by half a millennium as moving herds of animals driven by humans seeking good pasture conditions may lead to more balanced impacts of pastures on the vegetation and thus to greater vegetation quality. Which effects prevailed is still controversial. Increased grazing has been invoked to explain the increase in dust emissions after the end of the AHP. The effects of grazing on vegetation cover are context-dependent and hard to generalize over wider regions.

=== Global ===
A general drying trend is observed in the northern tropics, and between 5,000 and 4,500 calibrated years ago, the monsoons weakened. Perhaps as a consequence of the end of the AHP, Asian monsoon precipitation declined between 5,000 and 4,000 years ago. A drought 5,500 years ago is recorded in Mongolia and eastern America, where drought conditions around 5,500–5,000 years ago occurred in places like Florida and between New Hampshire and Ontario. A drying tendency is also noted in the Caribbean and the Central Atlantic. The final retreat of vegetation from the Sahara may have helped cause the 4.2 kiloyear event.

Conversely, in South America there is evidence that the monsoon behaves oppositely consistent with precessional forcing; water levels in Lake Titicaca were low during the middle Holocene and began to rise again after the end of the AHP. Likewise, a trend towards increased wetness took place in the Rocky Mountains at this time although it was accompanied by a drier phase around Lake Tahoe, California and in the Western United States. Widespread climate change occurred around the North Atlantic at the time the AHP ended, and there are connections between the North American and African climate. The end of the AHP may have reduced heat transport into the Arctic, causing cooling there.

=== Consequences ===
==== Humans ====
As observed at archaeological sites, settlement activity in the Sahara decreased after the AHP. Beginning from the north, population in Northern Africa decreased between 6,300 - 5,200 or 5,300 years ago, taking less than a millennium. In inner Arabia, many settlements were abandoned about 5,300 years ago and there was a transition in Arabian monument construction. Some Neolithic people in the desert persisted for longer thanks to the exploitation of groundwater.

Different human populations responded to the drying in diverse ways, with responses in Western Sahara distinct from those in Central Sahara. In the Sahara, subsistence and pastoralism replaced hunter-gatherer activity and a more nomadic lifestyle replaced semi-sedentary lifestyles as observed in the Acacus Mountains of Libya. Nomadic lifestyles also developed in the Eastern Sahara/Red Sea Hills in response to the end of the AHP. There was a shift in domestic animal use from cattle to sheep and goats as these are more suited in arid climates, a change reflected in rock art from which cattle disappeared at this time.

The development of irrigation systems in Arabia may have been an adaptation to the drying tendency. The decreased availability of resources forced human populations to adapt; in general, fishing and hunting declined in favour of farming and herding. However, the effects of the end of the AHP on human food production have been subject to controversy.

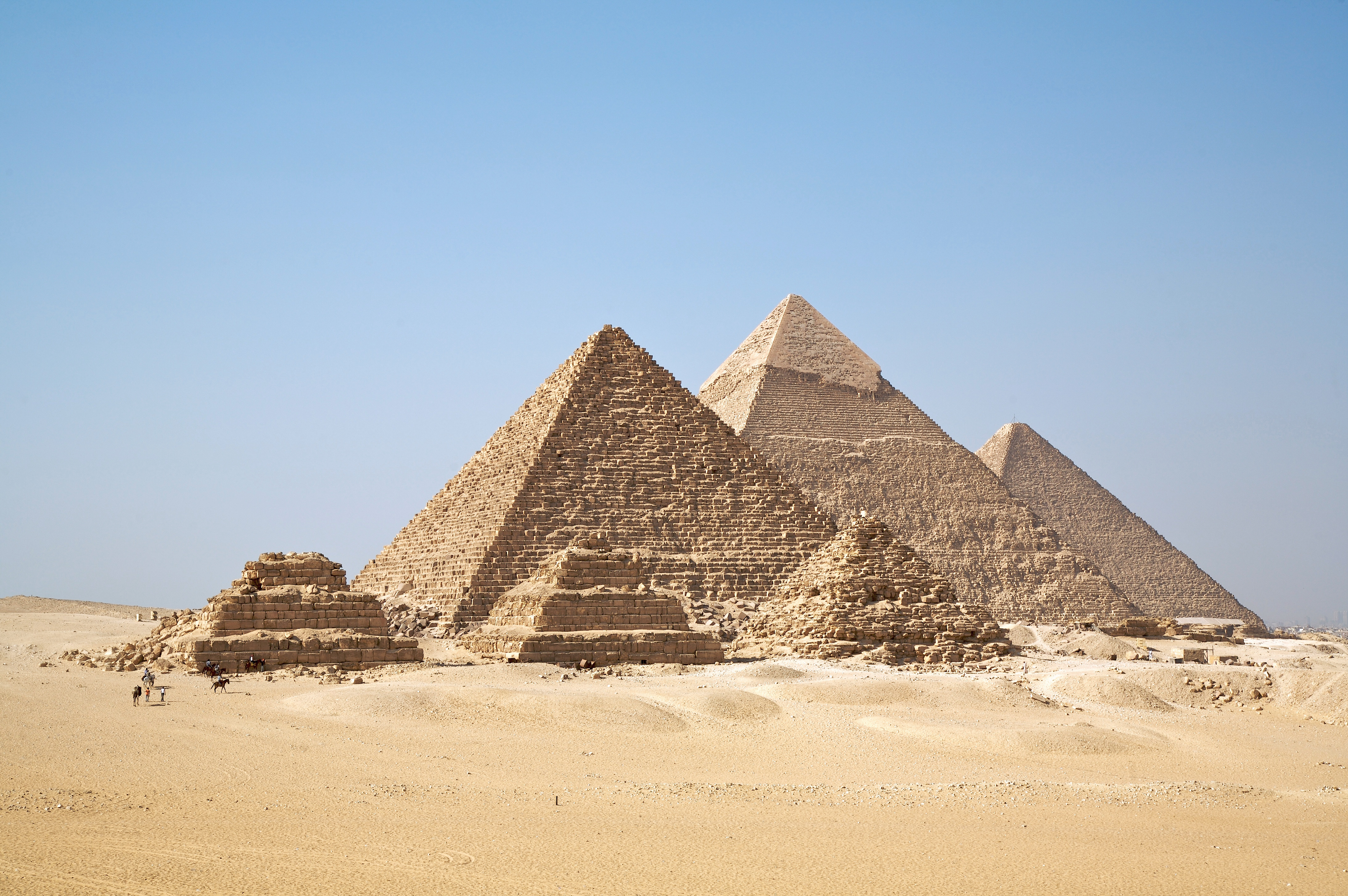
The pyramids of Giza, the most recognizable trace left by the Egyptian civilization

The warm episode and coinciding drought may have triggered animal and human migration to less inhospitable areas and the appearance of pastoralists where previously fishery-dependent societies had existed, as happened at Lake Turkana. Humans moved to the Nile, (Note: At the time of the Gerzeh culture, later followed by the Early Predynastic. In upper Egypt, the Badarian culture developed when the AHP ended.) where the society of Ancient Egypt with pharaohs and pyramids was eventually forged by these climate refugees perhaps reflecting renewed exuberance; thus the end of the AHP can be considered responsible for the birth of Ancient Egypt. Lower water levels in the Nile also aided the settlement of its valley as has been observed at Kerma. A similar process may have led to the development of the Garamantian civilization. Such human migrations towards more hospitable conditions along rivers and the development of irrigation also took place along the Euphrates, Tigris and Indus, leading to the development of the Sumerian and Harappan civilizations. During the so-called "Dark Millennium" between 6,000–5,000 years ago, people left the southern coast of the Persian Gulf for more hospitable areas in what is present-day Oman. Population shifts into mountain areas have also been reported for the Air Mountains, Hoggar and Tibesti. In other places, such as the Acacus Mountains, populations conversely remained in oases and hunter-gatherers also stayed in the Horn of Africa.

The Nile itself was not totally unaffected however; the 4.2 kiloyear event and the end of the AHP may be linked to the collapse of the Old Kingdom in Egypt when the Nile floods failed for three decades around 4,160 years before present and the final drying occurred. The ongoing decrease of precipitation after the end of the AHP could be the cause of the end of the Akkadian Kingdom in Mesopotamia. The end of the Garamantian civilization may also relate to climate change although other historical events were probably more important; at Tanezzuft oasis after 1,600 years ago it certainly relates to the drying trend.

In Central Africa, forests became discontinuous and savannahs formed in some places, facilitating the movement and growth of Bantu speaking populations; these in turn may have affected the ecosystem. The vegetation changes may have aided in the establishment of agriculture. The relatively slow decline of precipitation gave humans more time to adapt to the changing climate conditions. In East Africa, the beginning of the "Pastoral Neolithic" and the appearance of Nderit pottery have been attributed to the climatic changes at the end of the AHP.

Cultural changes may also have occurred as a consequence of climate change, such as changes in gender roles, the development of elites, the increased presence of human burials where formerly cattle burials predominated, as well as an increase of monumental architecture in the Sahara may have also been a response to increasingly adverse climates. A spread in cattle domestication at the time of climate change and as herders escaped the drying Sahara southwards may also relate to these events, although the details of the exact process by which cattle domestication spread are still controversial. Finally, changes in agricultural practices at the end of the AHP may be associated with the propagation of malaria and one of its causative pathogens Plasmodium falciparum; in turn these may correlate with the origin of human genome variants such as sickle cell disease that are linked to malaria resistance.

==== Non-human ====
In the Sahara, animal and plant populations were fragmented and restricted to certain favoured areas, such as the moist areas of mountain ranges; this happened, for example, to fish and crocodiles, which persist only in isolated water bodies. Mediterranean plants such as cypresses too persist only in mountains, along with some reptiles that may have also been stranded in mountains by the drying. The whip spider Musicodamon atlanteus is probably also a relic of past wetter conditions. The development of human-specific populations of the malaria-transmitting mosquito Aedes aegypti coincides with the end of the AHP. The buffalo species Syncerus antiquus probably went extinct from the increased competition of pastoralists triggered by the climate drying. Goat populations in Ethiopia shrunk during the droughts that followed the end of the AHP, and lion and possibly barley habitat declined across Africa. The drying of the African Great Lakes region split gorilla populations into western and eastern populations, and a similar population split between the parasitic wood wasp species Chalinus albitibialis and Chalinus timnaensis in Northern Africa and the Middle East may have also been caused by the expansion of deserts there. Some aquatic species disappeared from the Sahara. Giraffes, widespread in the Sahara during the AHP, may have been forced to migrate into the Sahel; this, together with the separating effect of Lake Megachad, may have influenced the development of giraffe subspecies. Climate change together with human impacts may have led to the extinction of many large mammals in Egypt, such as the hartebeest in the Sahara. In the Ruwenzori Mountains, vegetation changes may have been enhanced by climatic cooling. In northern Madagascar, wildlife declined after the end of the AHP even before the arrival of humans. On the other hand, the decline of tree cover may have grown the niche available to domestic animals, and modern Afromontane vegetation and some drought-tolerant plant species may have expanded their range.

The Dahomey Gap (Note: The Dahomey Gap is a region without forests in southern Benin, Ghana and Togo that forms a gap in the Guineo-Congolian forest belt.) formed 4,500–3,200 years before present, correlative to the end of the AHP. The harbour porpoise declined in the Mediterranean due to a switch to oligotrophic conditions as discharge from African rivers decreased. Desert varnish formed on exposed rocks in the Sahara and at Lake Turkana in East Africa. Tectonic faulting and mass wasting eroded shorelines left by the AHP.

==== Global climate ====
The shrinkage of subtropical wetlands likely led to a drop in atmospheric methane concentrations between 5,500 and 5,000 years ago, before boreal wetlands expanded and offset the loss of subtropical wetlands, resulting in a return to higher atmospheric methane concentrations. Conversely, increases in atmospheric methane concentrations, detected in Greenland ice cores about 14,700 years ago, and atmospheric carbon dioxide decreases in the early Holocene may relate to the vegetation expansion caused by the AHP. The increase in concentration beginning 7,000 years ago may reflect increased aridity, although other processes were probably more important.

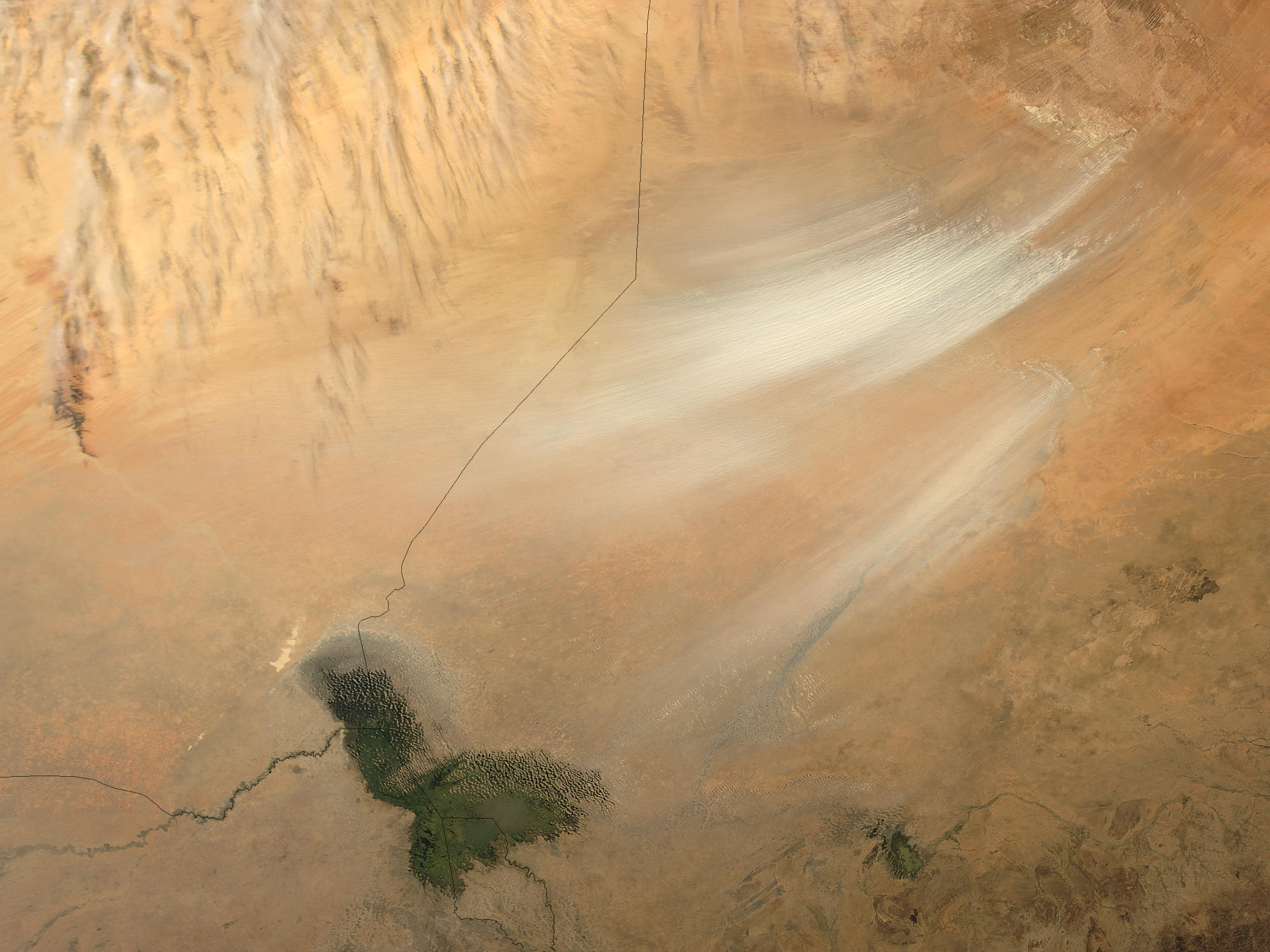
Dust originating in the Bodele depression

A sudden increase in the amount of land-originating dust in an oceanic drill core off Cape Blanc, Mauritania, has been interpreted as reflecting the end of the AHP 5,500 years ago, occurring in only a few centuries. Increased African dust deposition took place at Ciomad, central Portugal and the Durmitor Massif, all in Europe. Potentially, alluvial (Note: Alluvium refers to sediments deposited by running water, which have not solidified into rocks.) sediments emplaced during the AHP and dried up lake basins became an important source for dust and silt-sized particles. Today, the Sahara is the single largest source of dust in the world, (Note: Roughly five times larger than during the AHP.) with far ranging effects on climate and ecosystems, such as the growth of the Amazon rainforest.

In one climate model, the desertification of the Sahara at the end of the AHP reduces the amount of heat transported in the atmosphere and ocean towards the poles, inducing cooling of 1–2 °C (1.8–3.6 °F), especially in winter in the Arctic and an expansion of sea ice. Reconstructed temperatures in the Arctic indeed show a cooling, although less pronounced than in the climate model. Further, this climate transition in the climate model is accompanied by increased negative Arctic Oscillation states, a weaker subpolar gyre and increased precipitation and cold air outbreaks in much of Europe; such changes have also been observed in paleoclimate data. These findings imply that the vegetation state of the Sahara influences the Northern Hemisphere climate. In turn, this high latitude cooling may have further reduced precipitation over Africa. Hou et al. 2024 proposed that the drying of the Sahara induced drying in northern China and moistening in southern China, through a cooling in the Indo-Pacific Warm Pool and an eastward shift of the Walker circulation. This was accompanied by cultural changes in China, with a decline in the number of archeological sites, and the Walker circulation change may be a causal mechanism for the 4.2 ka event.

== Present-day situation ==
Presently, the African Monsoon still influences the climate between 5° south and 25° north latitude; the latitudes around 10° north receive the bulk of their precipitation from the monsoon (Note: The main area of monsoon rains does not coincide with the ITCZ.) during summer, with smaller amounts of rainfall occurring farther north. Thus, farther north deserts can be found while the moister areas are vegetated. In the Central Sahara, annual precipitation reaches no more than 50–100 millimetres per year (2.0–3.9 in/year). Even farther north, the desert's margin coincides with the area where the westerlies bring precipitation; they also influence southernmost Africa. Subsidence of air over parts of Northern Africa is responsible for the existence of deserts, which is further increased by the radiative cooling over the desert. Climate variability exists to this day, with the Sahel suffering from droughts in the 1970s and 1980s when precipitation decreased by 30% and the flow of the Niger River and Senegal River even more, followed by an increase of precipitation. The droughts are one of the most significant climate anomalies of the 20th century. Sea surface temperatures and feedbacks from land surface conditions modulate the strength of the monsoon, and the droughts may have been triggered by sea surface temperature changes forced by anthropogenic aerosols. A large increase in dust fluxes after 1800 AD has been explained with changed agricultural practices.

In East Africa the monsoon leads to two rain seasons in the equatorial area, the so-called "long rains" in March–May and the "short rains" in October–November when the ITCZ moves northward and southward over the region, respectively; in addition to the Indian Ocean-sourced precipitation there is also Atlantic (Note: The Atlantic Ocean is also the source of monsoon rainfall for the Sahel.)- and Congo-sourced precipitation west of the Congo Air Boundary. In Arabia, the monsoon does not penetrate far from the Arabian Sea; some areas are under the influence of winter precipitation brought by cyclones from the Mediterranean Sea. East Africa is also influenced by monsoon circulations. South Africa has monsoonal, winter-precipitation, and nonseasonal precipitation climates.

== Implications for future global warming ==
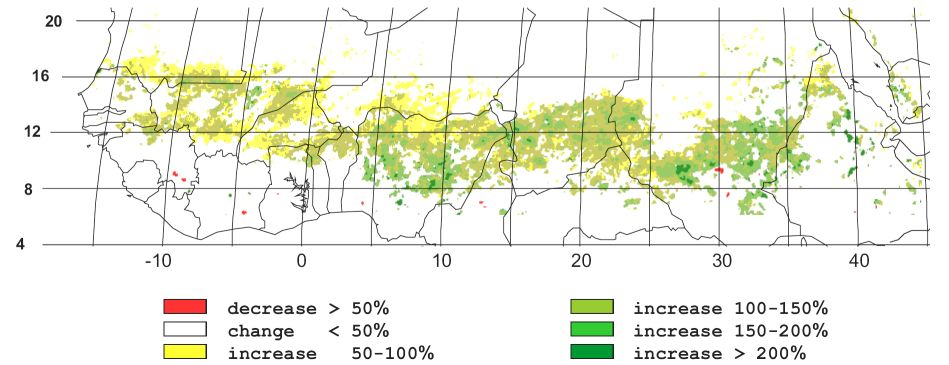
Greening of the Sahel between 1982 and 1999

Some simulations of global warming and increased carbon dioxide concentrations have shown a substantial increase in precipitation in the Sahel/Sahara. This and the increased plant growth directly induced by carbon dioxide could lead to an expansion of vegetation into present-day desert, although it would be less extensive than during the mid-Holocene and perhaps accompanied by a northward shift of the desert, i.e., a drying of northernmost Africa. Such a precipitation increase may also reduce the amount of dust originating in Northern Africa, with effects on hurricane activity in the Atlantic and increased threats of hurricane strikes in the Caribbean, the Gulf of Mexico and the East Coast of the United States.

The Special Report on Global Warming of 1.5 °C and the IPCC Fifth Assessment Report indicate that global warming will likely result in increased precipitation across most of East Africa, parts of Central Africa, and the principal wet season of West Africa, although there is significant uncertainty related to these projections, especially for West Africa. In addition, the end of the 20th century drying trend may be due to global warming. On the other hand, West Africa and parts of East Africa may become drier during certain seasons and months. Currently, the Sahel is becoming greener, but precipitation has not fully recovered to levels reached in the mid-20th century.

Climate models have yielded equivocal results about the effects of anthropogenic global warming on the Sahara/Sahel precipitation. Human-caused climate change occurs through different mechanisms than the natural climate change that led to the AHP: Human-mediated climate change drives increased precipitation mainly through increased atmospheric moisture availability and disproportionate warming of the extratropics which strengthen the monsoon circulation, moderated by increased atmospheric stability, while the natural climate change is driven by a stronger monsoon circulation. The direct effect of heat on plants may be detrimental. Non-linear increases in vegetation cover are also possible, with several climate models showing abrupt increases when global temperatures rise by 2–4 °C (3.6–7.2 °F). One study in 2003 showed that vegetation intrusions in the Sahara can occur within decades after strong rises in atmospheric carbon dioxide but would not cover more than about 45% of the Sahara. That climate study also indicated that vegetation expansion can only occur if grazing or other perturbations to vegetation growth do not hamper it. On the other hand, increased irrigation and other measures to increase vegetation growth such as the Great Green Wall could enhance it. A 2022 study indicated that while increased greenhouse gas concentrations by themselves are not sufficient to start an AHP if greenhouse gas-vegetation feedbacks are ignored, they lower the threshold for orbital changes to induce Sahara greening.

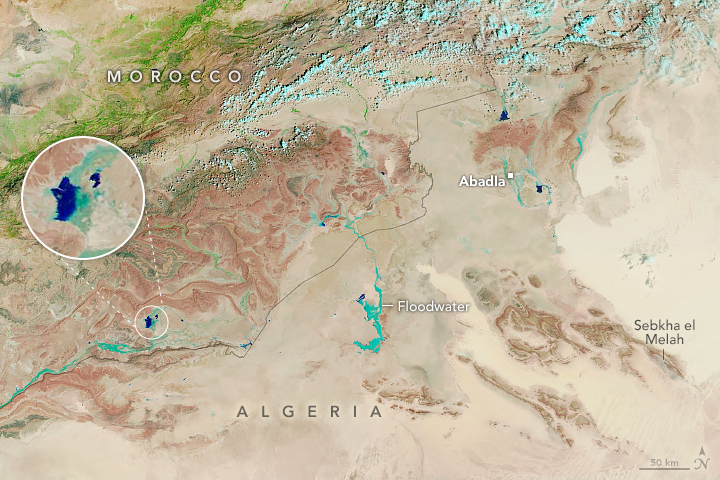
Creation of rivers and lakes from the 2024 monsoon in the Sahara

Plans to geoengineer the Sahara to increase its vegetation cover and precipitation have been proposed since the 19th century. The mechanisms and consequences of the AHP are an important context to evaluate such proposals and their ramifications; precipitation may increase, but the consumption of carbon dioxide would be small; there could be detrimental impacts on climate and dust fluxes in the far-field. Building the Great Green Wall and large solar farms in the Sahara desert would also act to decrease its albedo and may trigger similar climate responses.

A greening of the Sahara on the one hand may allow agriculture and pastoralism to expand into hitherto unsuitable areas, but increased precipitation can also lead to increased water-borne diseases and flooding. Expanded human activity resulting from a wetter climate may be vulnerable to climate reversals, as demonstrated by the droughts that followed the mid-20th-century wet period.

== See also ==
- Sahara pump theory
