= Abu Ballas =

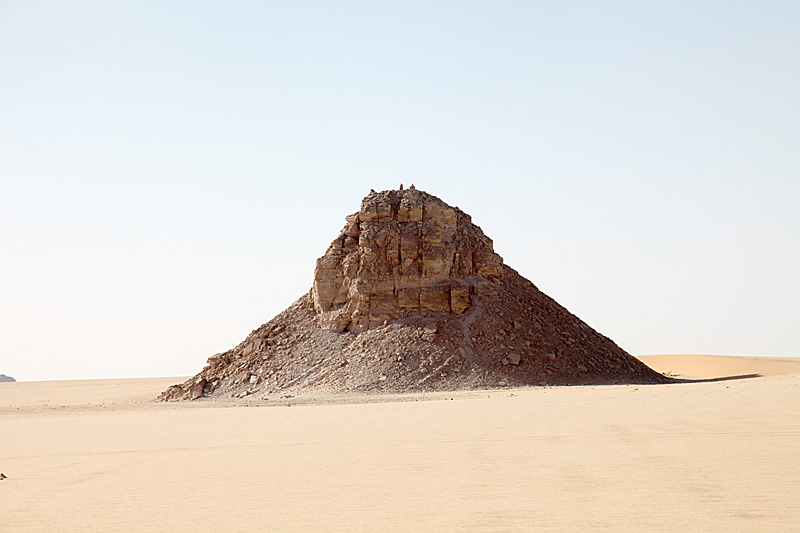
- Abu Ballas Rock

- Location in Egypt
- Type: Archaeological site
- Periods: Neolithic Pharaonic
- Location: New Valley, Egypt

History
- Built: c. 6700 BC
- Abandoned: c. 3700 BC

Site notes
- Discovered: 1918

Abu Ballas (the pottery hill) is an archaeological site in the Libyan Desert of Egypt. It lies about 200 km (120 mi) south-west of the Dakhla Oases and consists of two isolated sandstone cones in the otherwise flat desert. Both hills are covered with Egyptian pottery. These vessels were at the beginning of the 20th century often well preserved, but are today – due to modern tourism – very much destroyed. The site was discovered in 1918 and 1923. More recent research was undertaken in the last years.

The site gives its name to the geological Abu Ballas formation.

== Neolithic Occupation ==
Scholars suggest, that the Abu Ballas area has been occupied from about 6700 BC to around 3700 BC. They blame environmental conditions for a sudden cessation of human occupation there.

== The Abu Ballas Trail ==
The nature of this site remained mysterious for a long time. More recent research has shown that the site was a station on an ancient desert road, called the Abu Ballas Trail, that connected the Dakla Oasis with the Gilf Kebir and the Jebel Ouenat. Some researchers maintain that Abu Ballas was a milestone of an ancient Egyptian trade route into central Africa or for prospecting minerals The place was installed in the late Old Kingdom or early First Intermediate Period, when some authorities decided to arrange supply depots on a track in the desert. Abu Ballas was one of the largest of these supply depots. Besides the pottery, some rock carvings were discovered as well as stone tools and even a senet game board engraved on a stone. There are no water sources nearby, evidently all water and food was brought here from the Dakhla Oases with donkeys. Most likely people lived here only for short periods of time. The desert road was mainly in use at the end of the Old Kingdom and to a lesser extent in the Second Intermediate Period and in the New Kingdom.

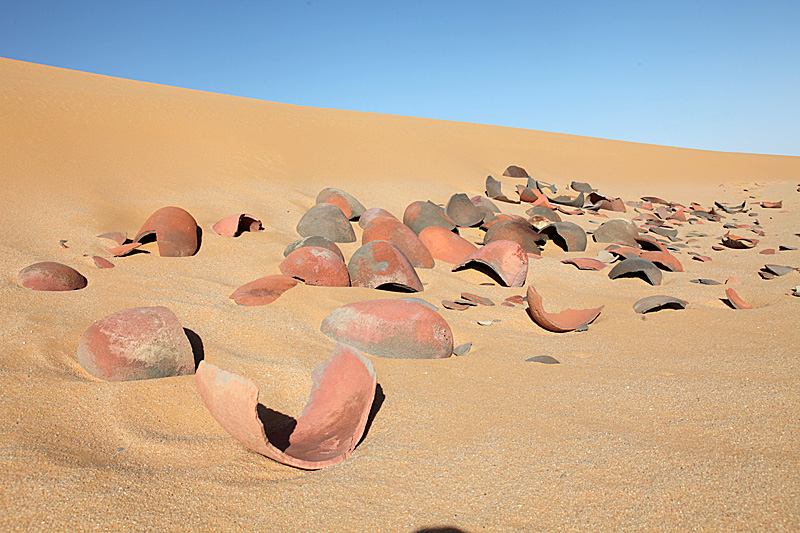
Pottery at Abu Ballas

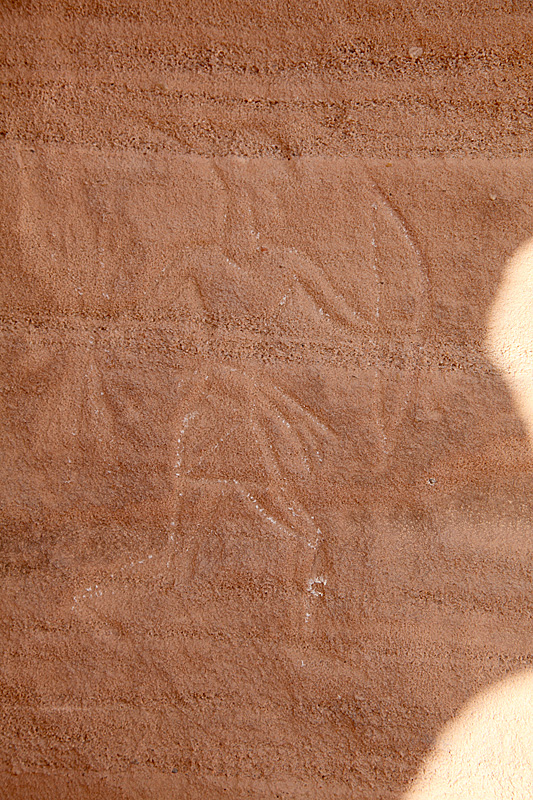
Engraving of bowman

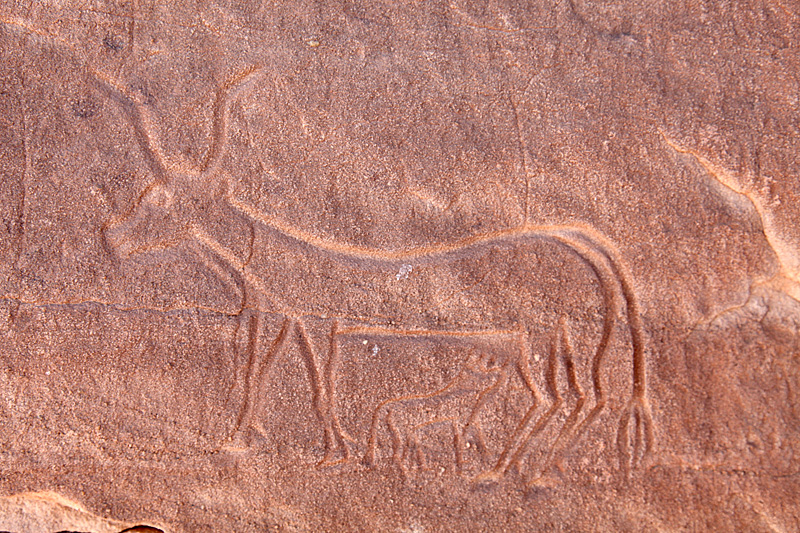
Engraving of a cow suckling its calf
