= Bølling–Allerød Interstadial =

Interglacial period about 14,000 years ago

Bølling–Allerød
- 0.0147 – 0.0129 Ma
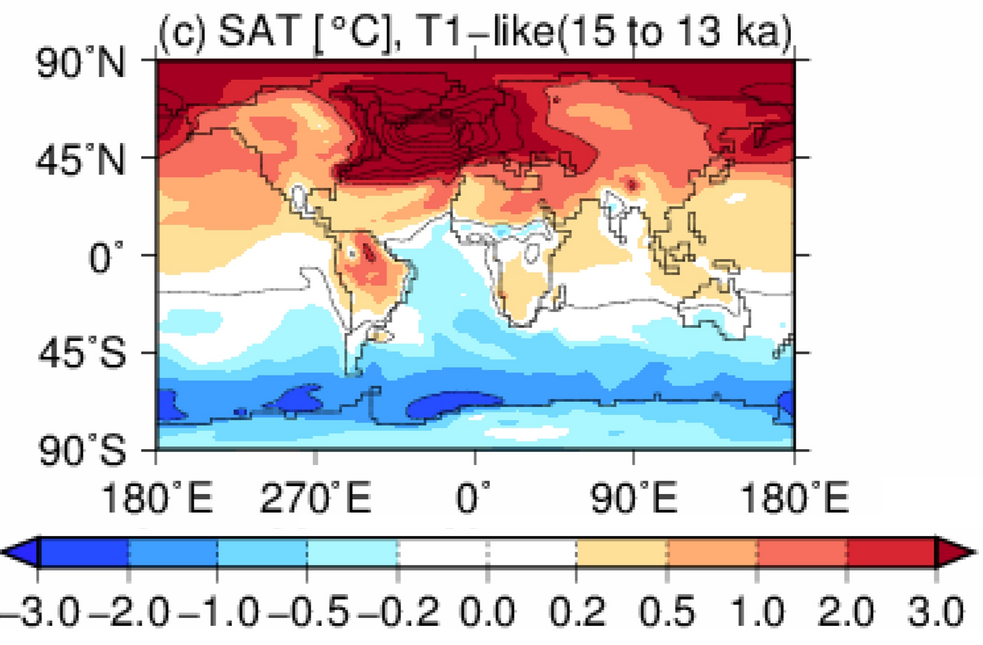
- Model simulations of the Bølling–Allerød Interstadial show significant warming of the Northern Hemisphere and the equivalent cooling of the South, caused by changes in the thermohaline circulation. This is consistent with the paleoclimate data.

Chronology
- Subdivisions: Bølling, Older Dryas, Allerød

Etymology
- Alternate spelling(s): B-A Interstadial
- Synonym(s): Late Glacial Interstadial Dansgaard-Oeschger event 1 Interstadial 1
- Former name(s): Bølling–Allerød warming

Usage information
- Celestial body: Earth

Definition
- Chronological unit: Chron
- Stratigraphic unit: Chronozone

Atmospheric and climatic data
- Mean atmospheric CO_{2} content: c. 235 ppm (0.8 times pre-industrial)
- Mean surface temperature: c. 12 °C (1.5 °C below pre-industrial)

The Bølling–Allerød Interstadial (Danish: [ˈpøle̝ŋ ˈæləˌʁœðˀ]), also called the Late Glacial Interstadial (LGI), was an interstadial period which occurred from 14,690 to c. 12,890 years Before Present, during the final stages of the Last Glacial Period. It was defined by abrupt warming in the Northern Hemisphere, and a corresponding cooling in the Southern Hemisphere, as well as a period of major ice sheet collapse and corresponding sea level rise known as Meltwater pulse 1A. This period was named after two sites in Denmark where paleoclimate evidence for it was first found, in the form of vegetation fossils that could have only survived during a comparatively warm period in Northern Europe. It is also referred to as Interstadial 1 or Dansgaard–Oeschger event 1.

This interstadial followed the Oldest Dryas period, which lasted from ~18,000 to 14,700 BP. While Oldest Dryas was still significantly colder than the current epoch, the Holocene, globally it was a period of warming from the very cold Last Glacial Maximum, caused by a gradual increase in CO_{2} concentrations. A warming of around 2 °C (3.6 °F) had occurred during this period, nearly half of which had taken place during its last couple of centuries. In contrast, the entire Bølling–Allerød Interstadial experienced very little change in global temperature. Instead, the rapid warming was limited to the Northern Hemisphere, while the Southern Hemipshere had experienced equivalent cooling. This "polar seesaw" pattern had occurred due to the strengthening of the Atlantic meridional overturning circulation (and the corresponding weakening of the Southern Ocean overturning circulation). These changes in thermohaline circulation had caused far more heat to be transferred from the Southern Hemisphere to the North.

For human populations of the Northern Hemisphere, Bølling–Allerød Interstadial had represented the first pronounced warming since the end of the Last Glacial Maximum (LGM). The cold had previously forced them into refuge areas, but the warming of the interstadial enabled them to begin repopulating the Eurasian landmass. The abrupt Northern cooling of the subsequent Younger Dryas may have triggered the Neolithic Revolution, with the adoption of agriculture in the Levant.

== Discovery ==
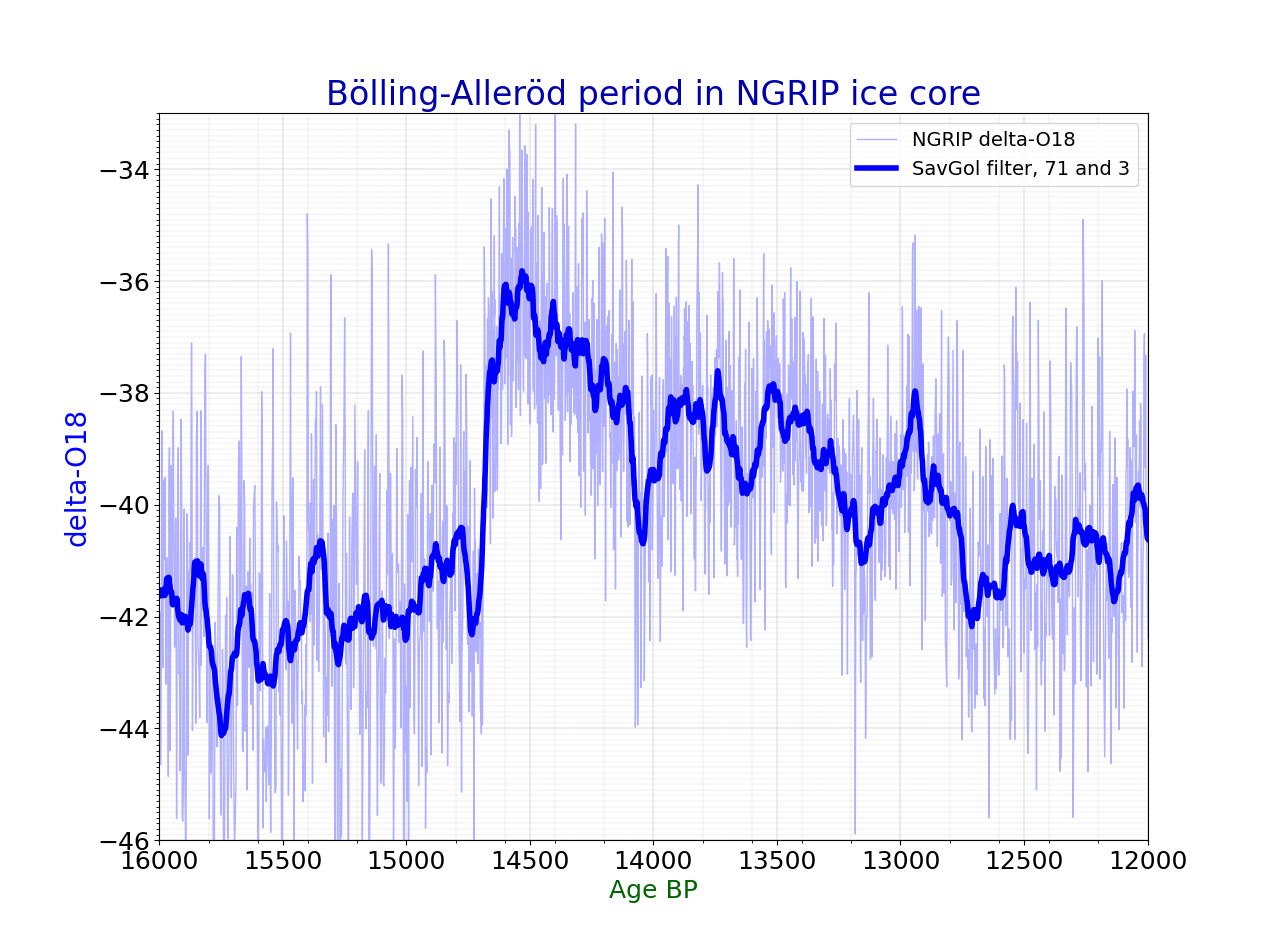
North Greenland Ice Core Project Oxygen Isotope Data

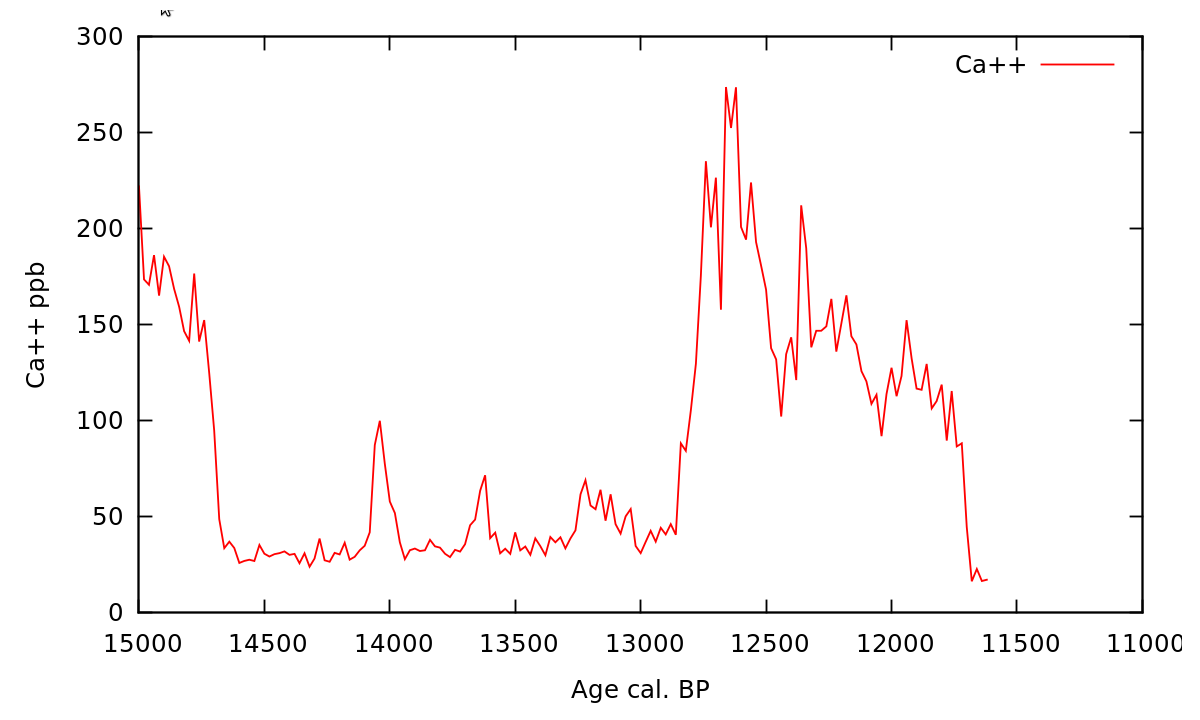
Calcium concentration and d18O isotope ratios from the Greenland NGRIP, GRIP, and GISP2 ice cores on the GICC05 time scale

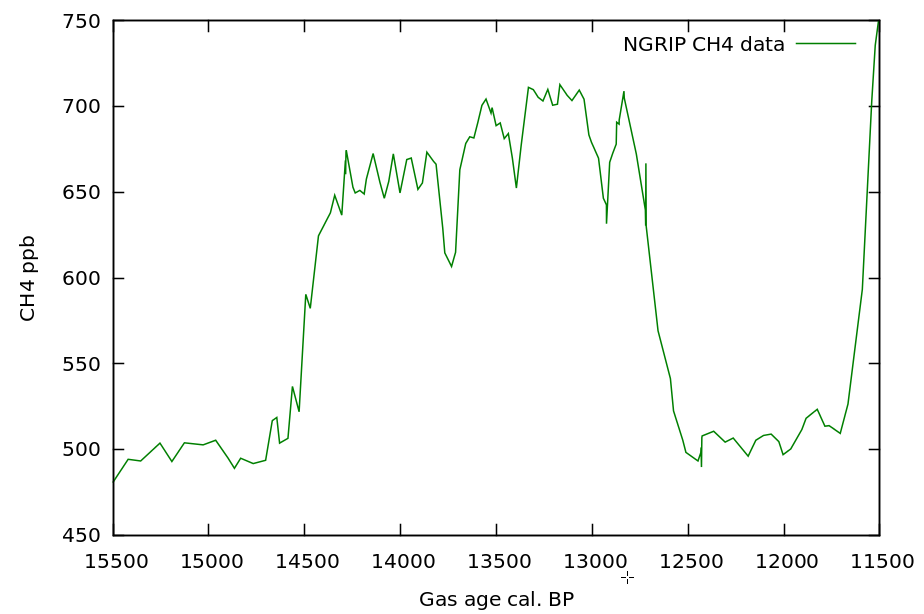
Methane (CH4) record from the North Greenland Ice Sheet Project (NGRIP) ice core, Greenland

In 1901, Danish geologists Nikolaj Hartz (1867–1937) and Vilhelm Milthers (1865–1962) found deposits of birch trees in a clay pit near Allerød Municipality on Zealand island and later in the drained peat deposits at Bølling Lake in Jutland peninsula (both parts of Denmark). This provided proxy evidence for consistent warming at these sites during the last glacial period, because the temperatures were warm enough to support these trees. In contrast, the rest of the glacial period was so cold that the dominant plant in the area was a small, cold-adapted flower called Dryas octopetala. Thus, the cold period which preceded this interstadial is known as the Oldest Dryas, and the two subsequent cold periods as the Older and Younger Dryas.

Additional evidence for this period involves the gathering of oxygen isotope stages (OIS) from stratified deep-sea sediment cores. Samples are gathered and measured for change in isotope levels to determine temperature fluctuation for given periods of time.

== Timing ==
This interstadial is commonly divided into three stages. The initial Bølling stage had the largest hemispheric temperature change, and it is also the stage when Meltwater Pulse 1A had occurred. The beginning of the Bølling is also end of the Oldest Dryas at approximately 14,600 years BP. The Oxygen isotope record from Greenland ice indicates that the Bølling stage lasted approximately 600 years.

It was then interrupted by the Older Dryas (after Dryas octopetala, an Arctic plant widespread during such cold periods in the Northern Hemisphere). The Older Dryas lasted approximately one century. before northern hemisphere warming returned during the Allerød stage.

The Allerød stage was a warm and moist global interstadial that occurred c.13,900 to 12,900 BP. It raised temperatures in the northern Atlantic region to almost present-day levels, before they declined again in the Younger Dryas, which was followed by the present warm Holocene. The interstadial stage started abruptly with a decline in temperatures within a decade and the onset of the glacial Younger Dryas. Global temperatures declined only slightly during YD, and they had steadily climbed alongside the CO_{2} concentrations once that period had transitioned to Holocene. There may have also been another brief cold stage during Allerød.

In regions where the Older Dryas is not detected in climatological evidence, the Bølling–Allerød is considered a single interstadial period.

== Causes ==
The strengthening of the Atlantic meridional overturning circulation is considered to be the primary cause for the Bølling–Allerød warming of the Northern Hemisphere, while its weakening is considered responsible for the inverse pattern during the Older and Younger Dryas. While CO_{2} increase had also occurred during this interstadial, it was at a rate of 20–35 ppmv within 200 years, or less than half of the increase of the recent 50 years, and role in global warming was dwarfed by the opposing hemispheric changes caused by thermohaline circulation.

Some research shows that a warming of 3–5 °C (5.4–9.0 °F) had occurred at intermediate depths in the North Atlantic over the preceding several millennia during Heinrich stadial 1 (HS1). The authors postulated that this warm salty water (WSW) layer, situated beneath the colder surface freshwater in the North Atlantic, generated ocean convective available potential energy (OCAPE) over decades at the end of HS1. According to fluid modelling, at one point the accumulation of OCAPE was released abruptly (c. 1 month) into kinetic energy of thermobaric cabbeling convection (TCC), resulting in the warmer salty waters getting to the surface and subsequently warming the sea surface by approximately 2 °C (3.6 °F).

== Geophysical effects ==
Records obtained from the Gulf of Alaska show abrupt sea-surface warming of about 3 °C (in less than 90 years), matching ice-core records that register this transition as occurring within decades. Antarctic Intermediate Water (AAIW) cooled slightly during this interstadial. The Meltwater pulse 1A event coincides with or closely follows the abrupt onset of the Bølling–Allerød (BA), when global sea level rose about 16 m during this event at rates of 26–53 mm/yr. In the Great Barrier Reef, the Bølling–Allerød period is associated with a substantial accumulation of calcium carbonate, which is consistent with the modelled cooling of the region.

A 2017 study attributed the second Weichselian Icelandic ice sheet collapse, onshore (est. net wastage 221 gigatons of ice per year over 750 years) and similar to today's Greenland rates of mass loss, to atmospheric Bølling–Allerød warming. The melting of the glaciers of Hardangerfjord began during this interstadial. Boknafjord had already begun to deglaciate before the onset of the Bølling–Allerød interstadial. Some research suggests that isostatic rebound in response to glacier retreat (unloading) and an increase in local salinity (i.e., δ^{18}Osw) was associated with increased volcanic activity at the onset of Bølling–Allerød. Notably, volcanic ash fallout on glacier surfaces could have had enhanced their melting through ice-albedo feedback.

The deep oceans were depleted in radiocarbon during the deglaciation following the LGM, which has been hypothesised to be the result of sluggish meridional overturning circulation or due to a release of volcanic carbon or methane clathrates into abyssal waters. The Eastern Tropical Pacific Oxygen Minimum Zone (ETP-OMZ) witnessed high oxygen depletion during the early stages of the deglaciation following the LGM, most likely as a result of a weakened Atlantic meridional overturning circulation (AMOC) and an increased influx of nutrient-rich waters due to intensified upwelling.

In the Southern Hemisphere, the weakened Southern Ocean overturning circulation caused the expansion of Antarctic Intermediate Water, which sequesters CO_{2} less effectively than the Antarctic bottom water, and this was likely the main reason for the increase in CO_{2} concentrations during the interstadial. The Bølling–Allerød was almost completely synchronous across the Northern Hemisphere.

== Effects on humans ==
=== Western Europe and the North European Plain ===
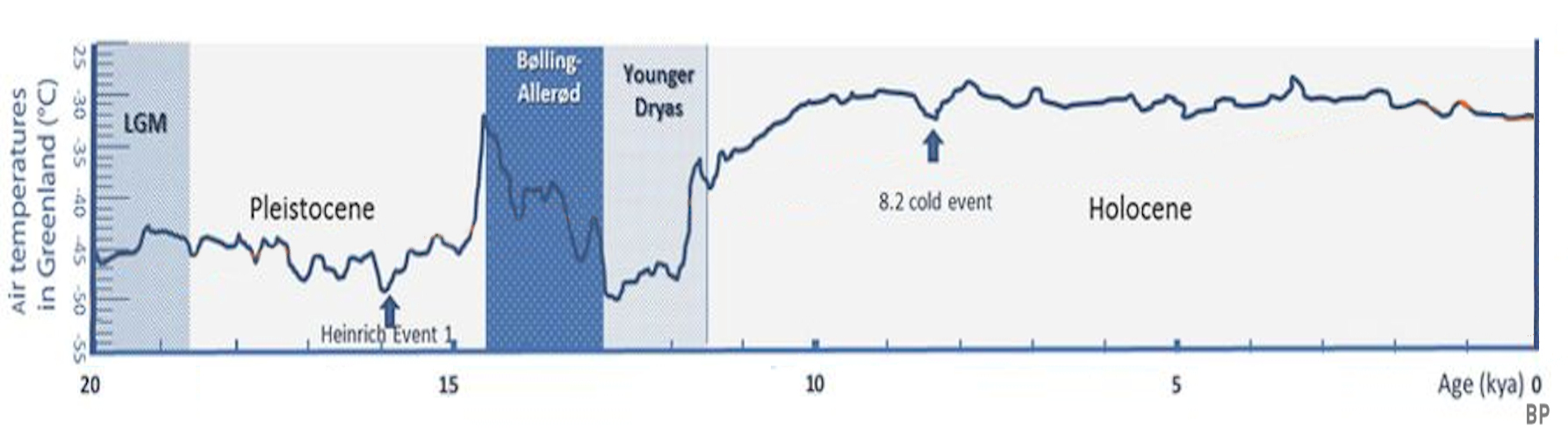
Greenland temperature trend after the Last Glacial Maximum, derived from the Greenland ice cores. It shows local warming of the Late Glacial Interstadial, ( ), followed by very low temperatures for the most part of the Younger Dryas, rapidly rising afterwards to reach the level of the globally warm Holocene. This trend is not representative of the global temperatures - Southern Hemisphere experienced opposite changes during the Late Glacial Interstadial and the Younger Dryas.

The climate began to improve rapidly throughout Western Europe and the North European Plain c. 16,000-15,000 years ago. The environmental landscape became increasingly boreal, except in the far north, where conditions remained arctic. Sites of human occupation reappeared in northern France, Belgium, northwest Germany, and southern Britain between 15,500 and 14,000 years ago. Many of these sites are classified as Magdalenian. In Britain, the Creswellian culture developed as an offshoot of the Magdalenian.

As the Fennoscandian ice sheet continued to shrink, plants and people began to repopulate the freshly deglaciated areas of southern Scandinavia. Large parts of what is now the southern part of the North Sea became dry land, now named Doggerland. This was a low landscape with soft hills, rivers, and lakes. By the end of the interstadial, Doggerland was probably covered by a sparse birch woodland, with flourishing fauna such as mammoths and red deer.

Prey favored by European hunters included reindeer, wild boar, European fallow deer, red deer, and European wild ass.

=== East European Plain ===
Periglacial loess-steppe environments prevailed across the East European Plain, but climates improved slightly during several brief interstadials and began to warm significantly after the beginning of the Late Glacial Maximum. Pollen profiles for this time indicate a pine-birch woodland interspersed with the steppe in the deglaciated northern plain, birch-pine forest with some broadleaf trees in the central region, and steppe in the south. The pattern reflects the reemergence of a marked zonation of biomes with the decline of glacial conditions. Human site occupation density was most prevalent in the Crimea region and increased as early as around 16,000 years ago. Reoccupation of northern territories of the East European Plain did not occur until 13,000 years ago.

Generally, lithic technology is dominated by blade production and typical Upper Paleolithic tool forms such as burins and backed blades (the most persistent). Kostenki archaeological sites of multiple occupation layers persist from the Last Glacial Maximum on the eastern edge of the Central Russian Upland, along the Don River. Epigravettian archaeological sites, similar to Eastern Gravettian sites, are common in the southwest, central, and southern regions of the East European Plain about 17,000 to 10,000 years BP and are also present in the Crimea and Northern Caucasus.

The time of the Epigravettian also reveals evidence for tailored clothing production, a tradition persisting from preceding Upper Paleolithic archaeological horizons. Fur-bearing small mammal remains abound such as Arctic fox and paw bones of hares, reflecting pelt removal. Large and diverse inventories of bone, antler, and ivory implements are common, and ornamentation and art are associated with all major industries. Insights into the technology of the time can also be seen in features such as structures, pits, and hearths mapped on open-air occupation areas scattered across the East European Plain.

Mammoths were typically hunted for fur, bone shelter, and bone fuel. In the southwest region around the middle Dnestr Valley, sites are dominated by reindeer and horse, accounting for 80 to 90% of the identifiable large mammal remains. Mammoth is less common, typically 15% or less, as the availability of wood eliminated the need for heavy consumption of bone fuel and collection of large bones for construction. Mammoth remains may have been collected for other raw material, namely ivory. Other large mammals in modest numbers include steppe bison and red deer.

Plant foods more likely played an increasing role in the southwest region than in the central and southern plains since southwest sites consistently yield grinding stones widely thought to have been used for preparation of seeds, roots, and other plant parts.

=== Siberian Plain ===
During the interstadial, Siberian human occupations sites are confined to latitudes below 57°N and most are C^{14} dated from 19,000 to 14,000 years ago. Settlements differed from those of the East European Plain as they reflected a more mobile lifestyle by the absence of mammoth-bone houses and storage pits, all indicators of long-term settlement. Visual art was uncommon. Fauna remained red deer, reindeer, and moose and indicate a mainly meat-oriented diet.

The habitat of Siberia was far harsher than anywhere else and often did not provide enough survival opportunities for its human inhabitants. That is what forced human groups to remain dispersed and mobile, as is reflected in the lithic technology, as tiny blades were typically manufactured, often termed microblades less than 8 mm wide with unusually sharp edges indicating frugality from low resource levels. They were fixed into grooves along one or both edges of a sharpened bone or antler point. Specimens of complete microblade-inset points have been recovered from both Kokorevo and Chernoozer'e. At Kokorevo, one was found embedded in a bison shoulder blade.

As climates warmed further around 15,000 years ago, fish began to populate rivers, and technology used to harvest them, such as barbed harpoons, first appeared on the Upper Angara River. People expanded northwards into the Middle Lena Basin.

The Dyuktai culture, near Dyuktai Cave, on the Aldan River at 59°N, is similar to southern Siberian sites and includes the wedge-shaped cores and microblades, along with some bifacial tools, burins, and scrapers. The site likely represents the material remains of the people who spread across the Bering Land Bridge and into the New World.

=== Asia ===
δ^{18}O records from Valmiki Cave in southern India indicate extreme shifts in Indian Summer Monsoon intensity at Termination 1a, which marks the start of the Bølling–Allerød and occurred about 14,800 BP.

In the Middle East, the pre-agricultural Natufian settled around the Eastern Mediterranean coast to exploit wild cereals, such as emmer and two-row barley. By the time of the Allerød, the Natufians may have started to domesticate grain, bake bread, and ferment alcohol.

=== North America ===
Over the land between the Lena Basin and northwest Canada, increased aridity occurred during the Last Glacial Maximum. Sea level fell to about 120 m below its present position, exposing a dry plain between Chukotka and western Alaska. Clear skies reduced precipitation, and loess deposition promoted well-drained, nutrient-rich soils that supported diverse steppic plant communities and herds of large grazing mammals. The wet tundra soils and spruce bogs that exist today were absent. In the Ozarks, a transitional vegetation regime consisting of ash trees, hophornbeams, and hornbeams predominated, with an increase in oak and a decline in spruce and pine across the period.

Cold temperatures and massive ice sheets covered most of Canada and the northwest coast, thus preventing human colonization of North America prior to 16,000 years ago. An "ice-free corridor" through western Canada to the northern plains is thought to have opened up no earlier than 13,500 years ago. However, deglaciation in the Pacific Northwest may have taken place more rapidly and a coastal route could have been available by 17,000 years ago. Rising temperatures and increased moisture accelerated environmental change after 14,000 years ago, as shrub tundra replaced dry steppe in many parts of Beringia.

Camp settlement sites are found along Tanana River in central Alaska by 14,000 years ago. Earliest occupation levels at the Tanana Valley sites contain artifacts similar to the Siberian Dyuktai culture. At Swan Point, these comprise microblades, burins, and flakes struck from bifacial tools. Artifacts at the nearby site of Broken Mammoth are few, but include several rods of mammoth ivory. The diet was of large mammals and birds, as indicated by faunal remains.

Earliest site occupation at Ushki sites of central Kamchatka (about 13,000 years ago) display evidence of small oval houses and bifacial points. Stone pendants, beads, and a burial pit are present. In central Alaska up the northern foothills at the Dry Creek site c. 13,500-13,000 years ago near Nenana Valley, small bifacial points were found. People were thought to have moved into this area to hunt elk and sheep on a seasonal basis. Microblade sites typologically similar to Dyuktai appear about 13,000 years ago in central Kamchatka and throughout many parts of Alaska.

=== Genetics ===
The European distribution of Y-chromosome haplogroup I and various associated subclades has also been explained as resulting from male postglacial recolonization of Europe from refugia in the Balkans, Iberia, and the Ukraine/Central Russian Plain.

Males possessing haplogroup Q are postulated as representing a significant portion of the population who crossed Beringia and populated North America for the first time.

The distribution of mtDNA haplogroup H has been postulated as representing the major female repopulating of Europe from the Franco-Cantabrian region after the Last Glacial Maximum. mtDNA haplogroups A, B, C, D and X are interpreted according to some as supporting a single pre-Clovis populating of the Americas via a coastal route.

== See also ==
- Antarctic Cold Reversal
- Dansgaard–Oeschger event
- Hiawatha Glacier
- Ice age
- Mammoth steppe
