= Oldest Dryas =

Abrupt climatic cooling event during the last glacial retreat

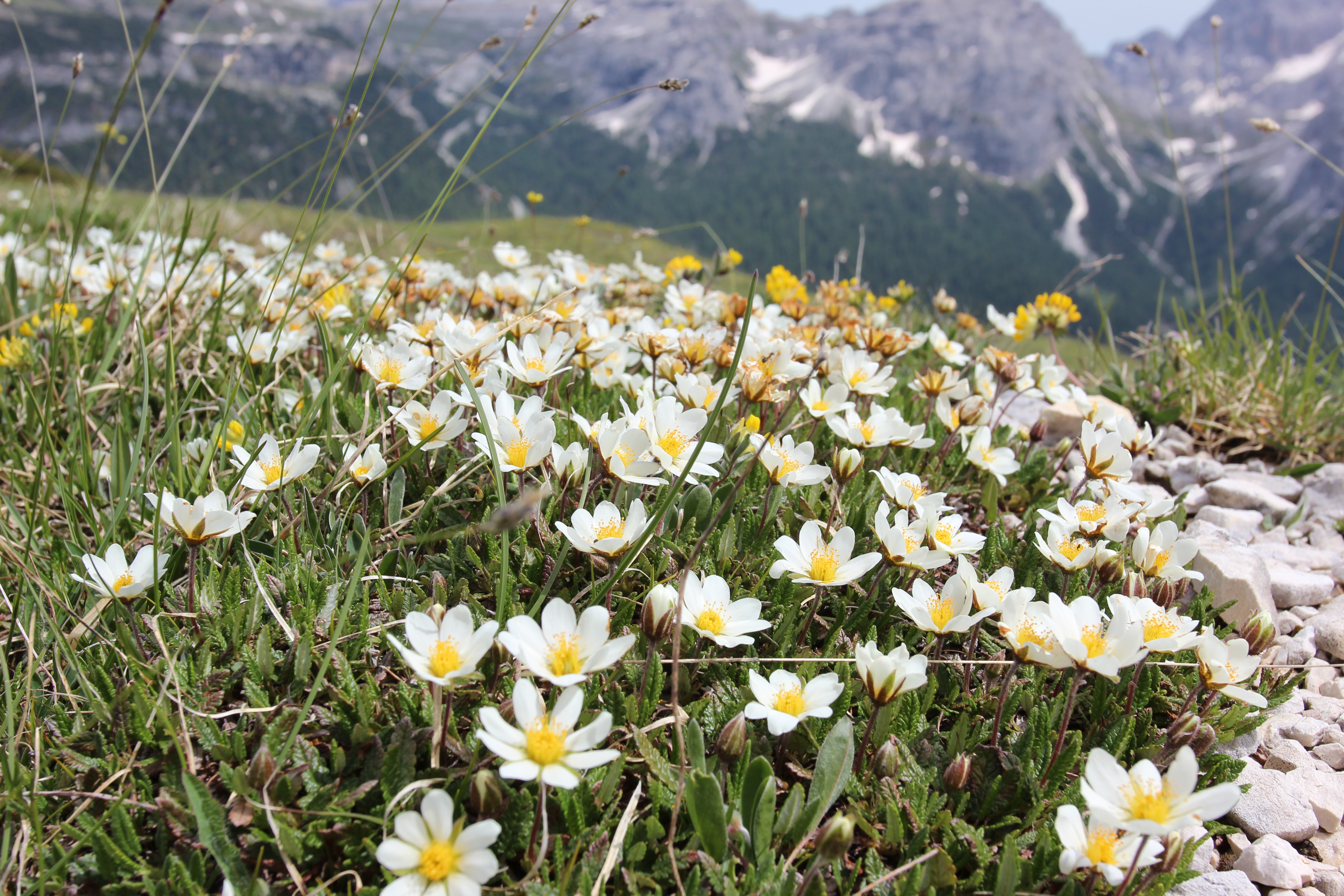
Dryas octopetala is the indicator species for the period

The Oldest Dryas (Note: A widely-employed nomenclature for climatic change during the last glacial termination is the sequence Oldest Dryas (stadial), Bølling oscillation, Older Dryas (relatively cool), Allerød oscillation, and Younger Dryas (stadial).) is a biostratigraphic subdivision layer corresponding to a relatively abrupt climatic cooling event, or stadial, which occurred during the last glacial retreat. The time period to which the layer corresponds is poorly defined and varies between regions, but it is generally dated as starting at 18.5–17 thousand years (ka) before present (BP) and ending 15–14 ka BP. As with the Younger and Older Dryas events, the stratigraphic layer is marked by abundance of the pollen and other remains of Dryas octopetala, an indicator species that colonizes arctic-alpine regions. The termination of the Oldest Dryas is marked by an abrupt oxygen isotope excursion, which has been observed at many sites in the Alps that correspond to this interval of time.

In the Alps, the Oldest Dryas corresponds to the Gschnitz stadial of the Würm glaciation. The term was originally defined specifically for terrestrial records in the region of Scandinavia, but has come to be used both for ice core stratigraphy in areas across the world, and to refer to the time period itself and its associated temporary reversal of the glacial retreat.

In the Iberian Peninsula, the glaciers of the Pyrenees, Sierra Nevada, Central Range, and Northwestern Mountains, which had almost entirely disappeared by 17,500 BP, began to advance once again. Between 16,800 and 16,500 BP, these glaciers abruptly advanced into montane valleys and deposited moraines near the moraines formed during the Last Glacial Maximum. These glaciers then began to oscillate between advance and retreat until a final glacial advance at 15,500 BP. A thousand years later, following a general glacial retreat, these alpine glaciers were relegated to cirques.

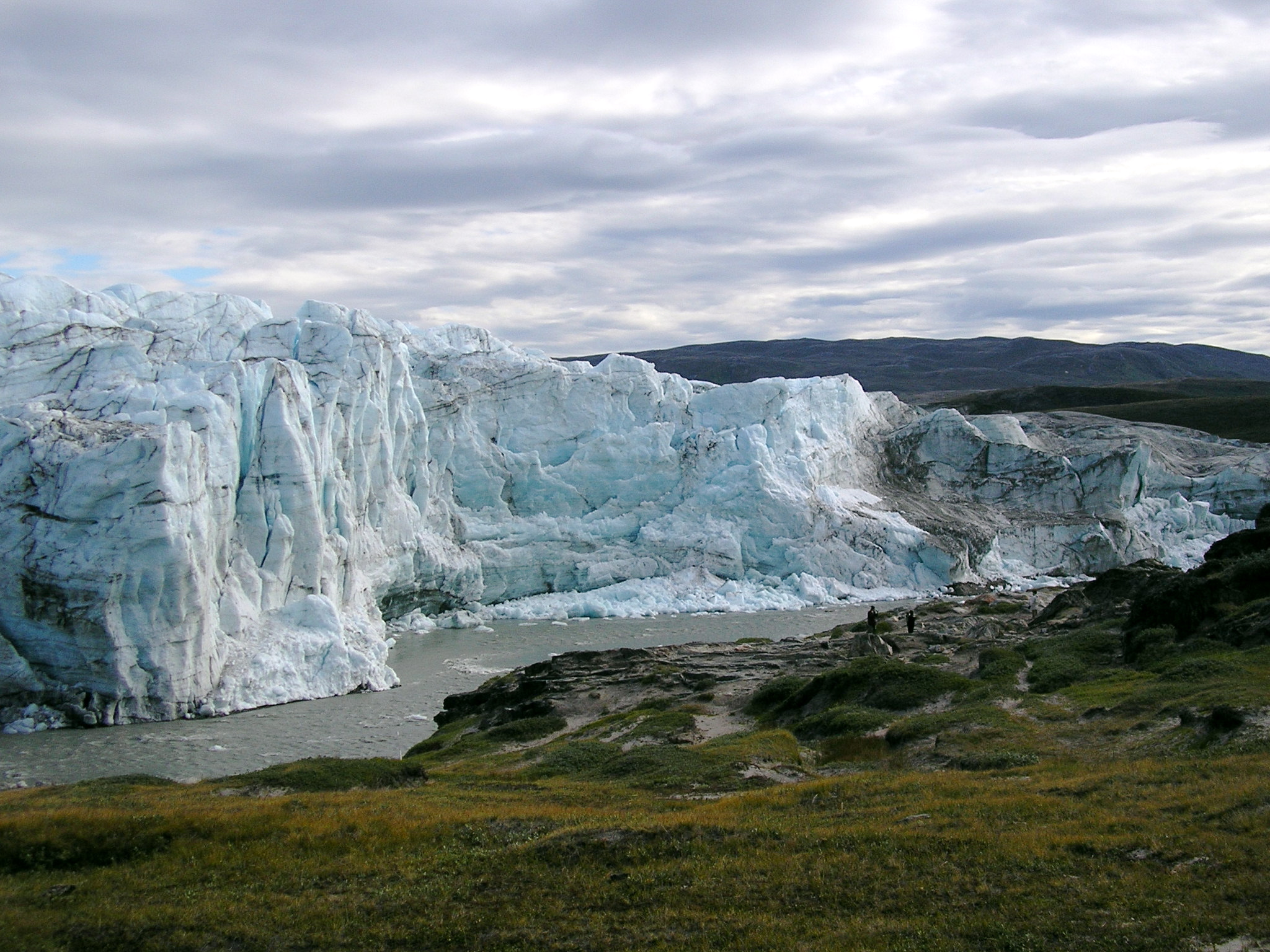
The edge of the ice in Greenland

== Flora ==
During the Oldest Dryas, Europe was treeless and similar to the Arctic tundra, but much drier and grassier than the modern tundra. It contained shrubs and herbaceous plants such as the following:

- Poaceae, grasses
- Artemisia
- Betula nana, dwarf birch
- Salix retusa, dwarf willow
- Dryas octopetala

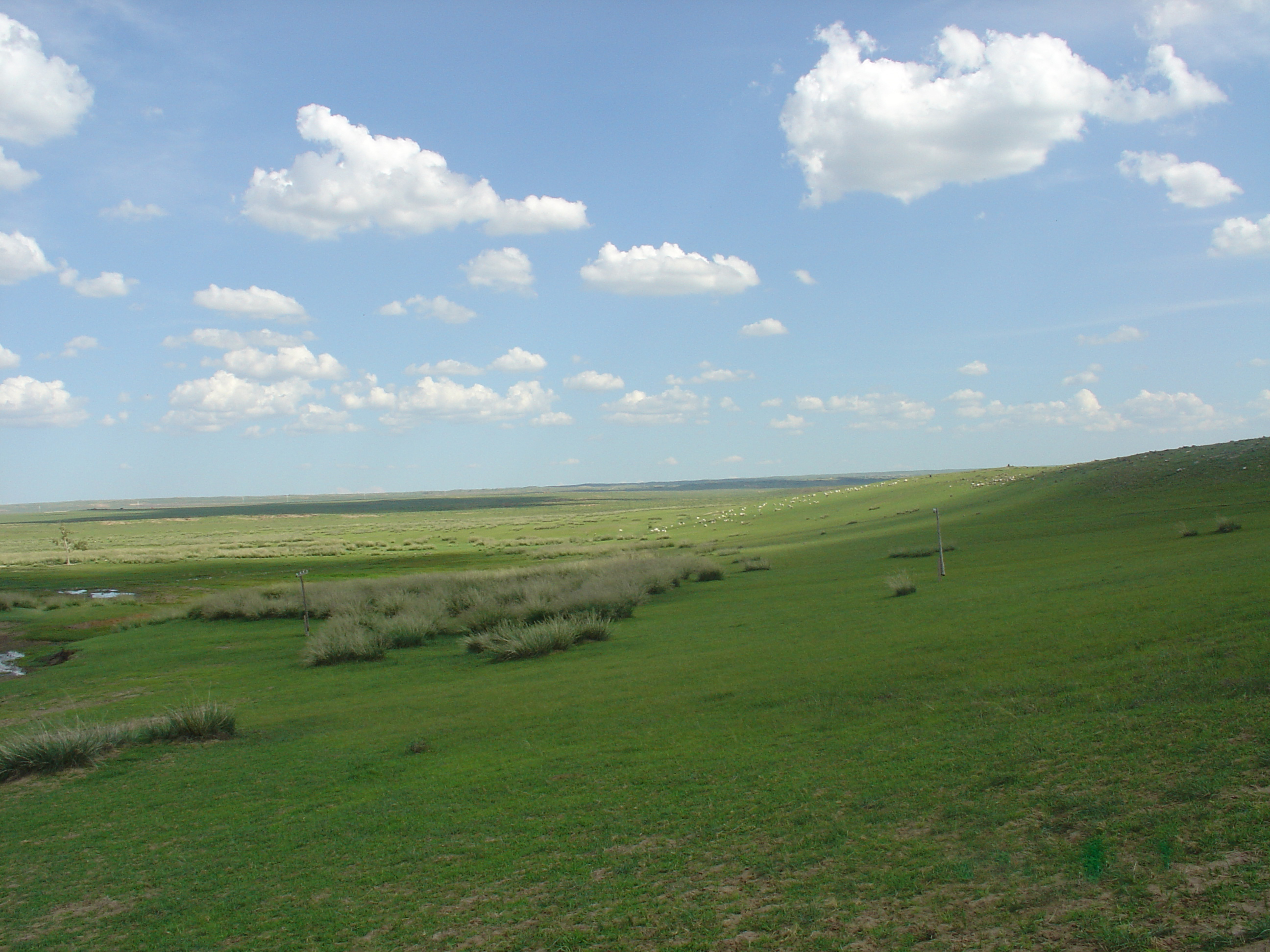
Grassland (Inner Mongolia)

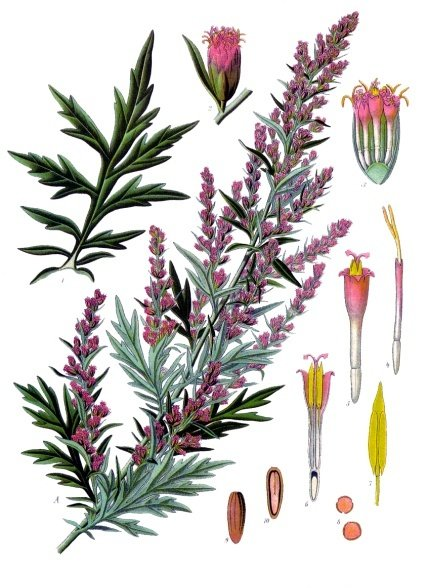
Artemisia vulgaris

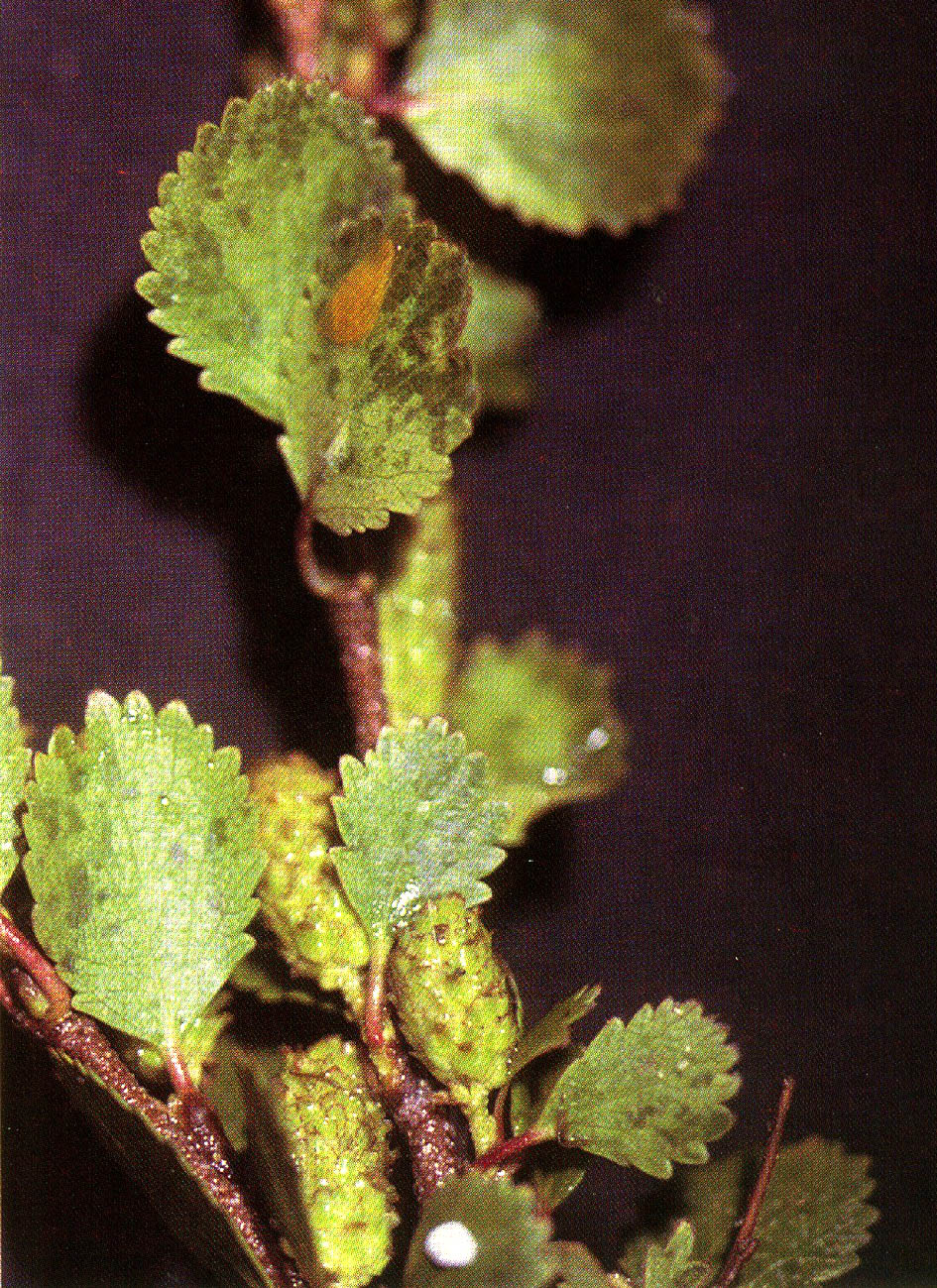
Betula nana

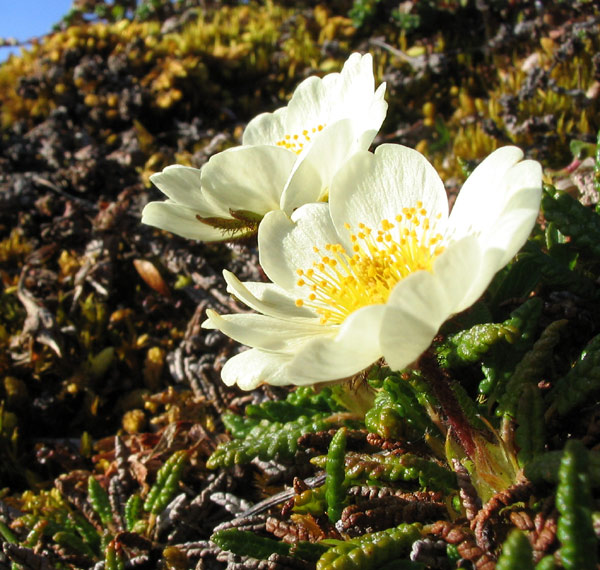
Dryas octopetala

== Fauna ==
Species were mainly Arctic but during the Glacial Maximum, the warmer weather species had withdrawn into refugia and began to repopulate Europe in the Oldest Dryas.

The brown bear, Ursus arctos, was among the first to arrive in the north. Genetic studies indicate North European brown bears came from a refugium in the Carpathians of Moldavia. Other refugia were in Italy, Spain and Greece.

The bears would not have returned north except in pursuit of food. The tundra must already have been well populated. It is likely that the species hunted by humans at Lake Neuchâtel in Switzerland by the end of the period were present during it. Here are other animals present:

Aves

- Gavia arctica, black-throated diver
- Podiceps nigricollis, black-necked grebe
- Cygnus cygnus, whooper swan
- Aquila chrysaetos, golden eagle

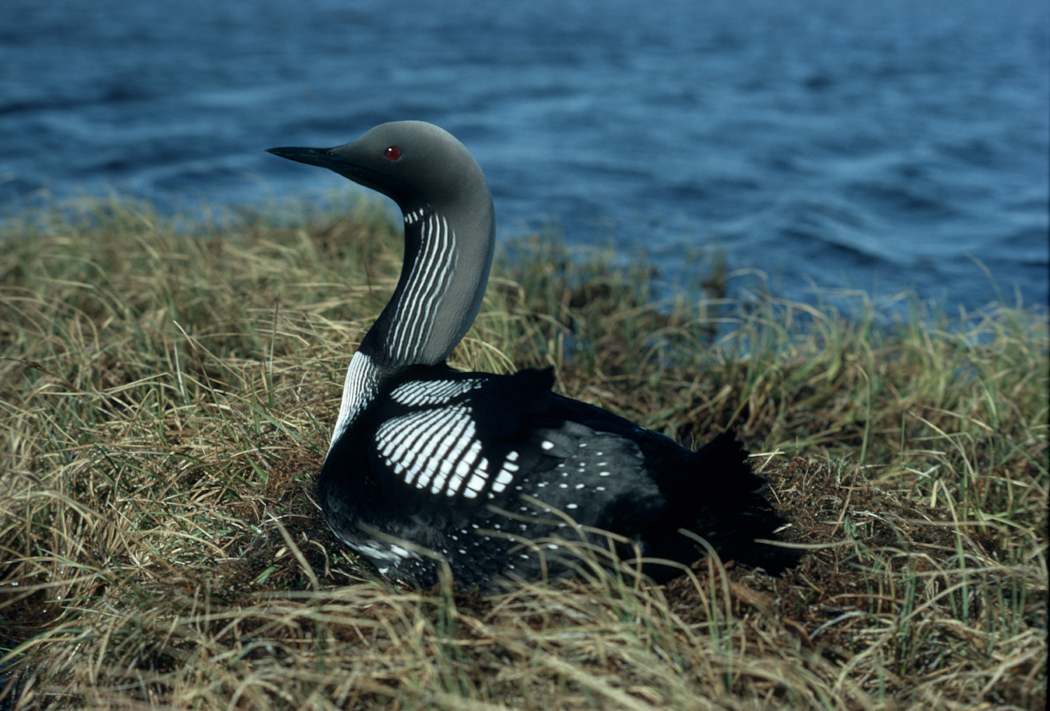
Gavia arctica

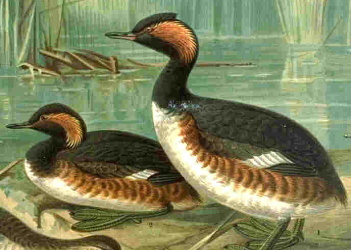
Podiceps nigricollis

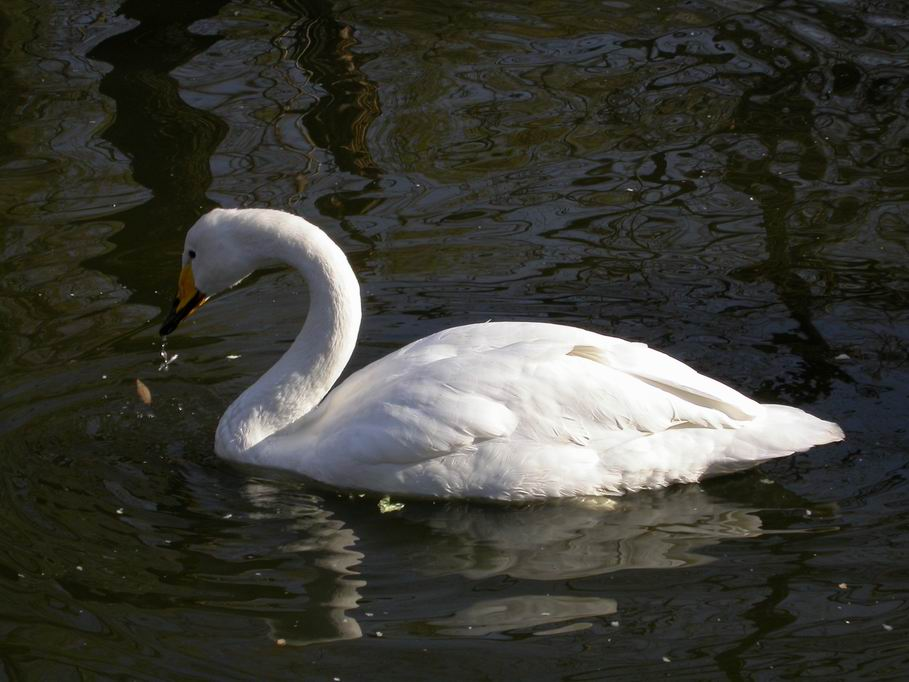
Cygnus cygnus

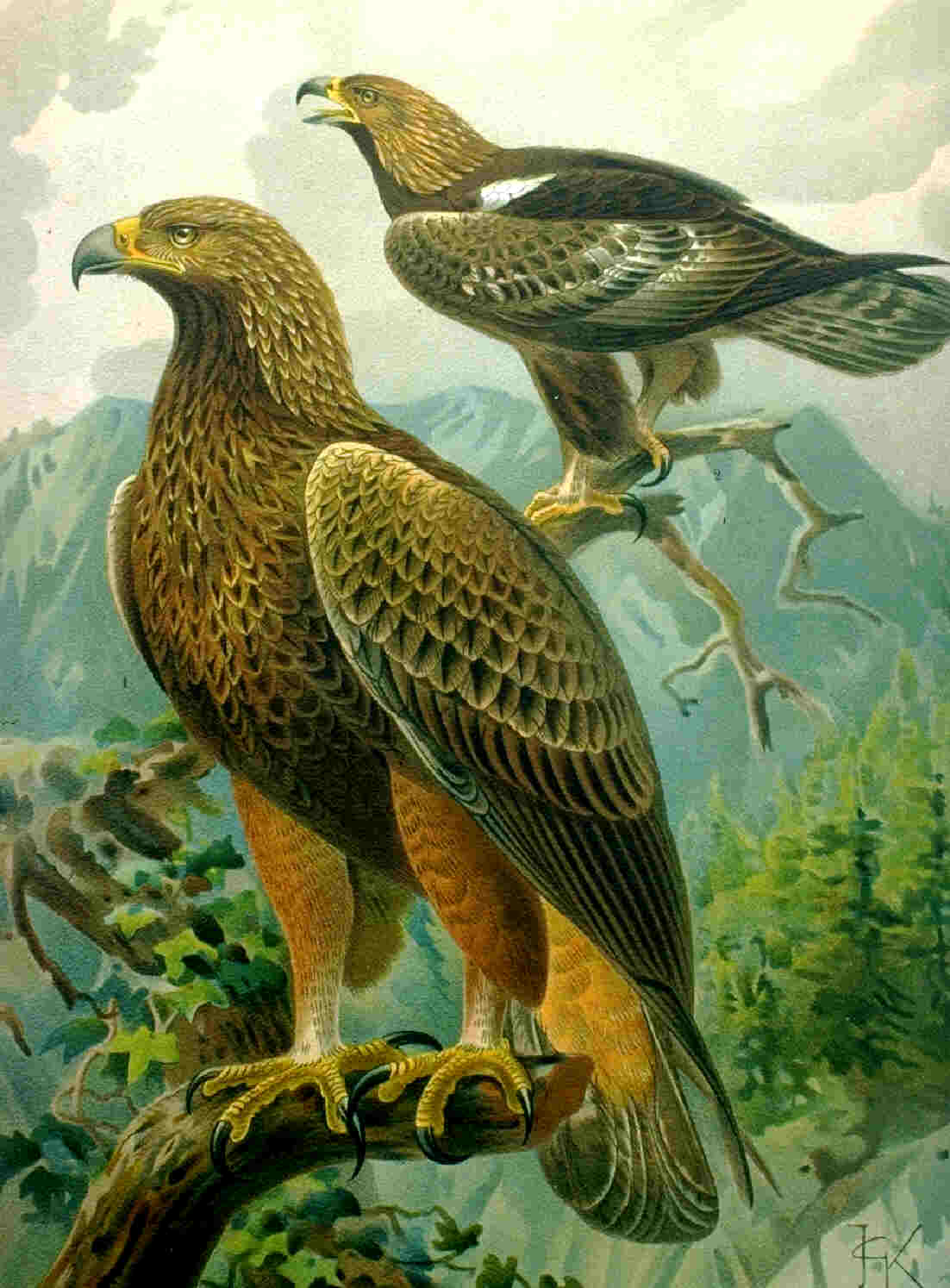
Aquila chrysaetos

The above birds are primarily maritime. They must have fed in the copious glacial waters of the north that were just beginning to be released.

Fish

- Lota lota, burbot
- Thymallus thymallus, grayling
- Rutilus rutilus, roach
- Salmo trutta, trout
- Salvelinus alpinus, char

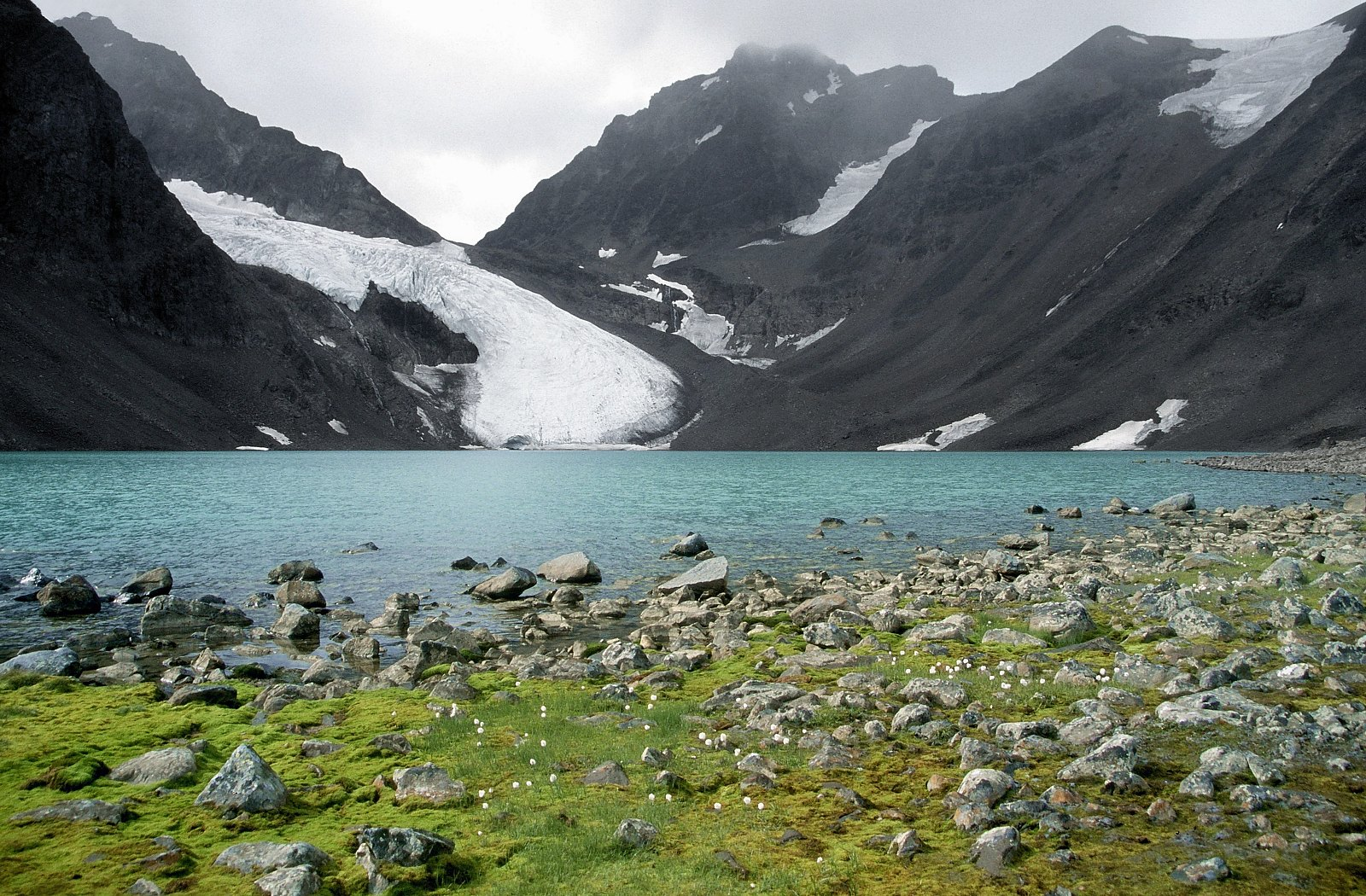
Glacial stream

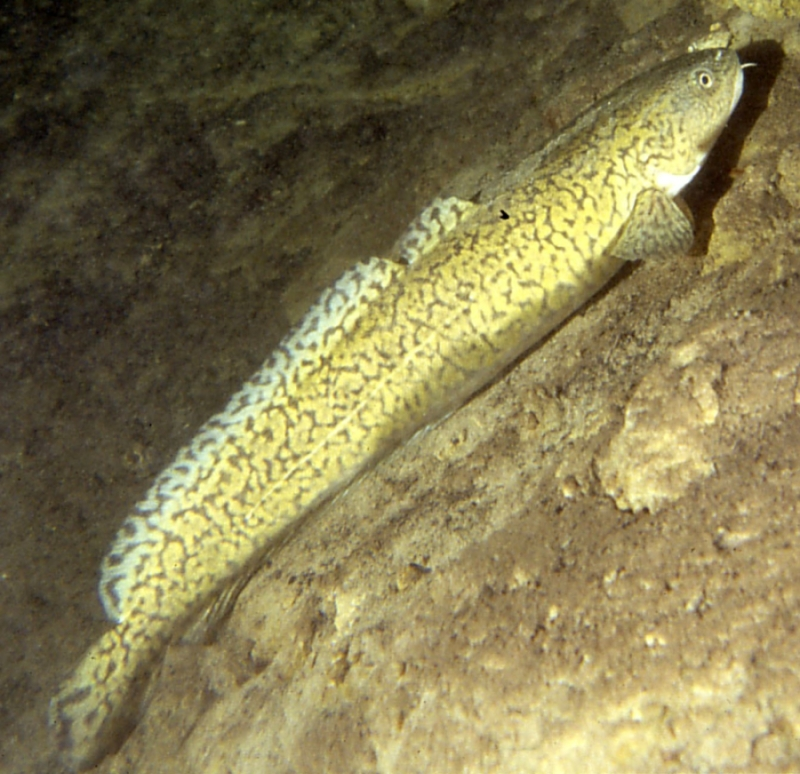
Lota lota

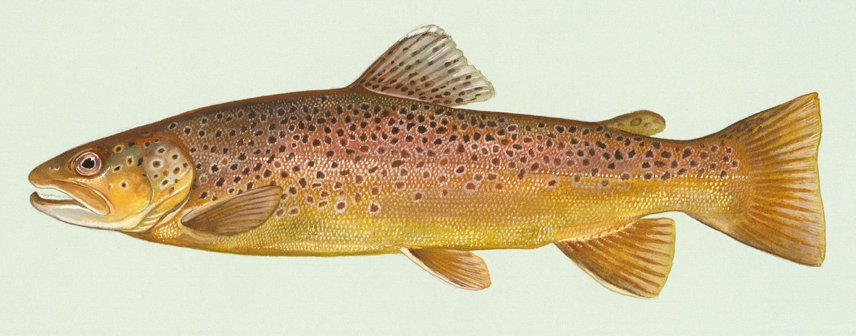
Salmo trutta

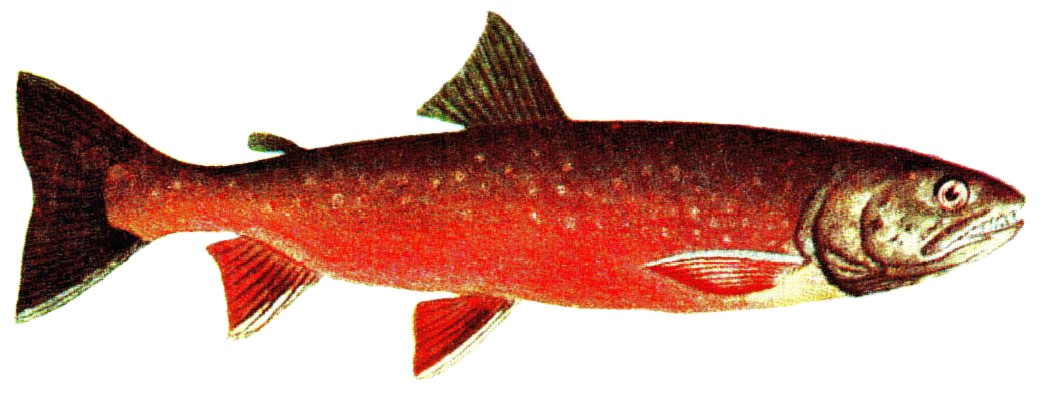
Salvelinus

The smaller mammals of the food chain inhabited the herbaceous blanket of the tundra:

Cricetidae

- Discrotonyx torquatus, collared lemming
- Microtus oeconomus, root vole
- Microtus arvalis, common vole
- Chionmys nivalis, snowy vole

Leporidae

- Lepus timidus, Arctic hare

Sciuridae

- Marmota marmota, marmot

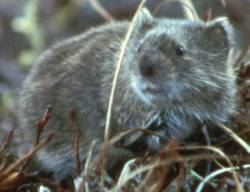
Microtus oeconomus

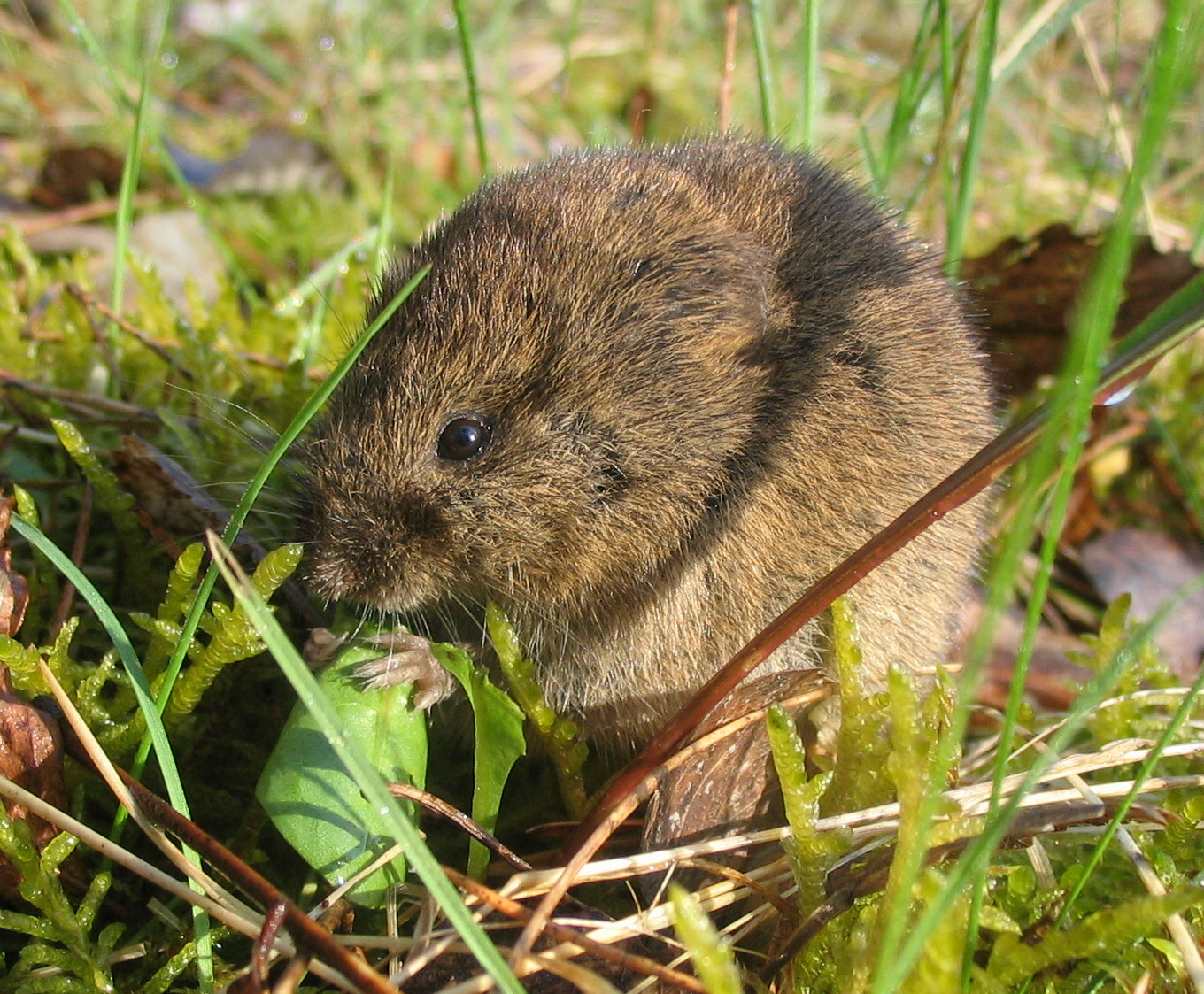
Microtus arvalis

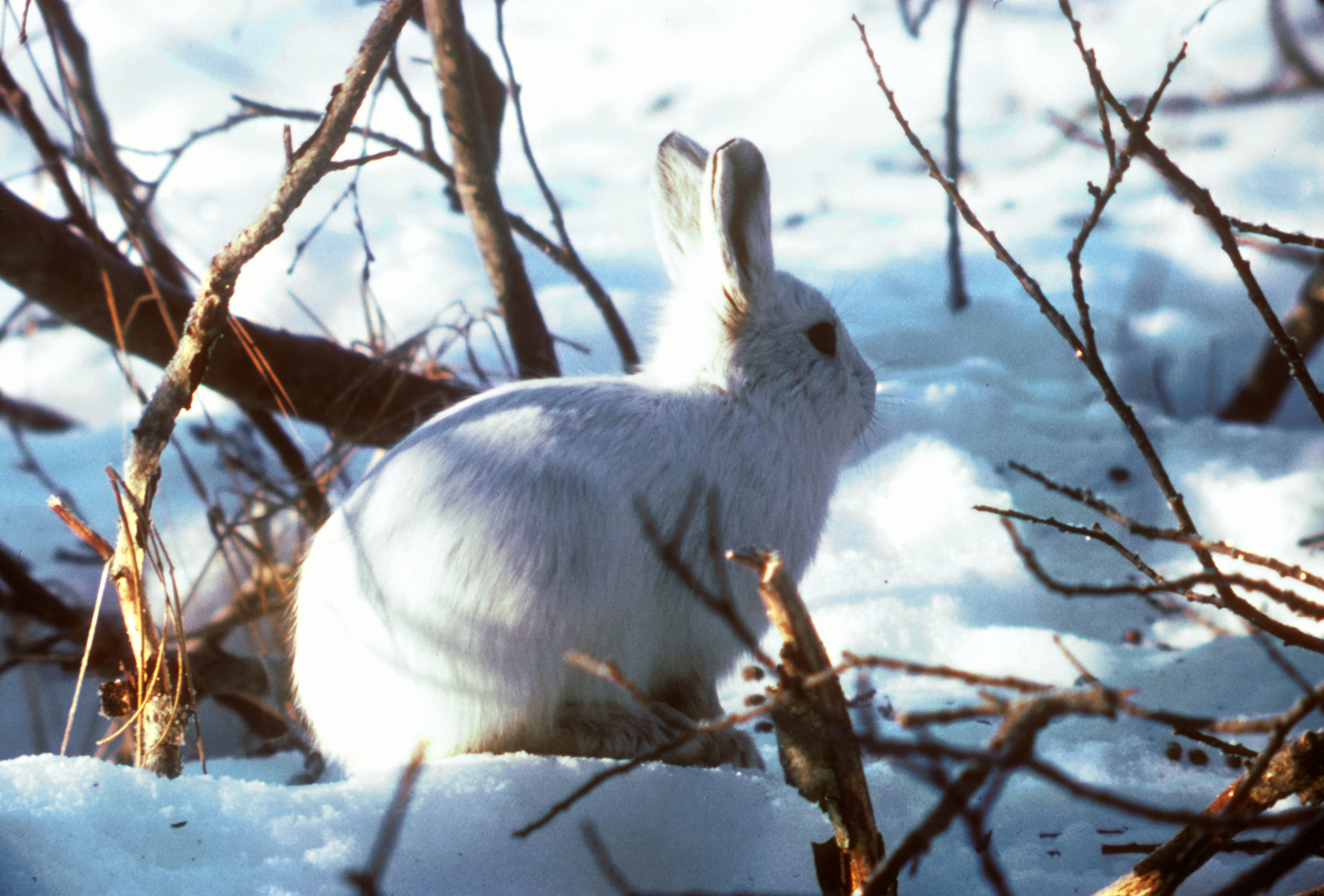
Lepus timidus

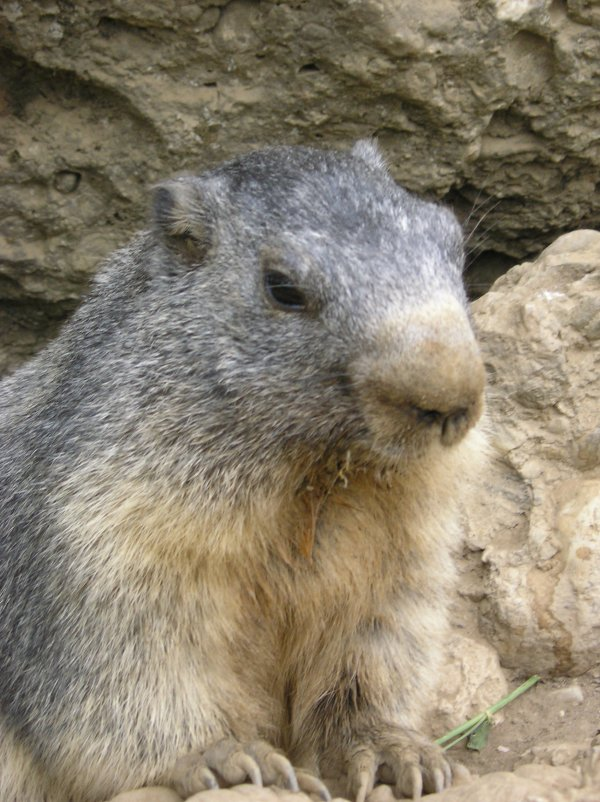
Marmota marmota

In addition to bears and birds were other predators of the preceding small animals:

Carnivora

- Felis lynx, lynx
- Alopex lagopus, Arctic fox
- Canis lupus, wolf

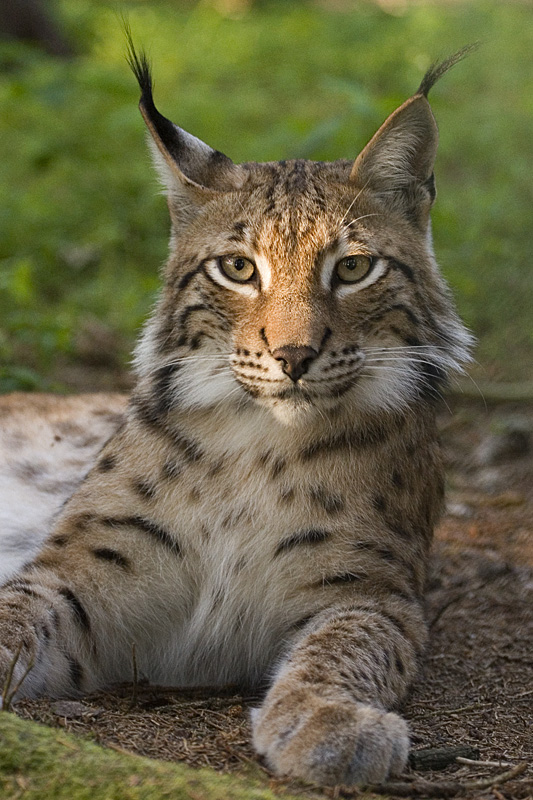
Lynx (or Felis) lynx

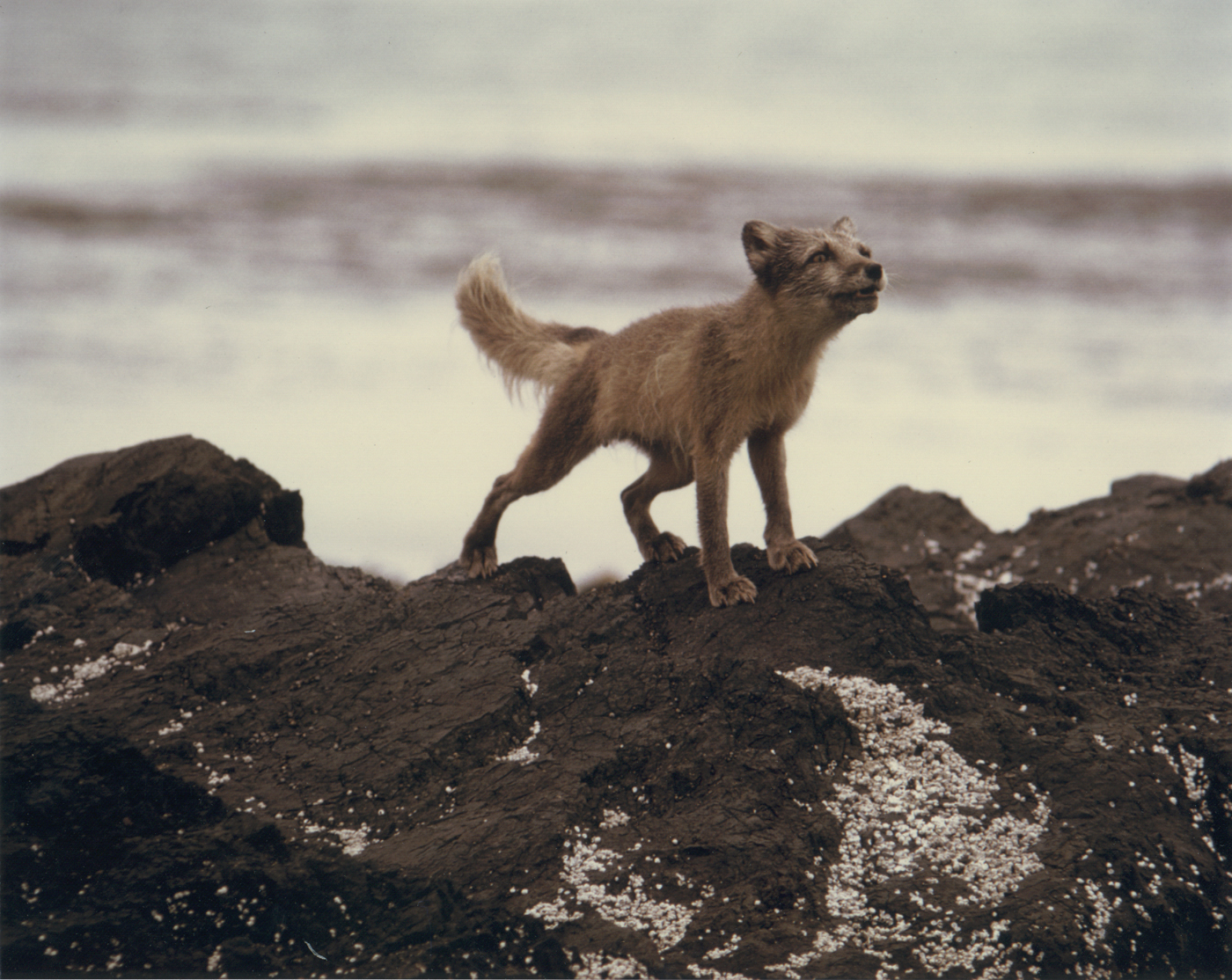
Alopex lagopus

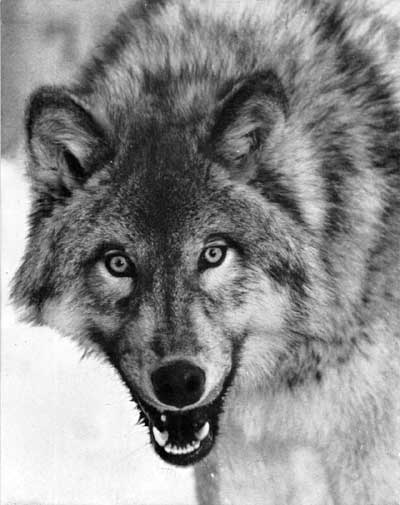
Canis lupus

Humans were interested in the large mammals, which included:

- Rangifer tarandus, reindeer
- Equus ferus, wild horse
- Capra ibex, ibex

At some point, the larger mammals arrived: hyena, woolly rhinoceros, cave bear and mammoth.

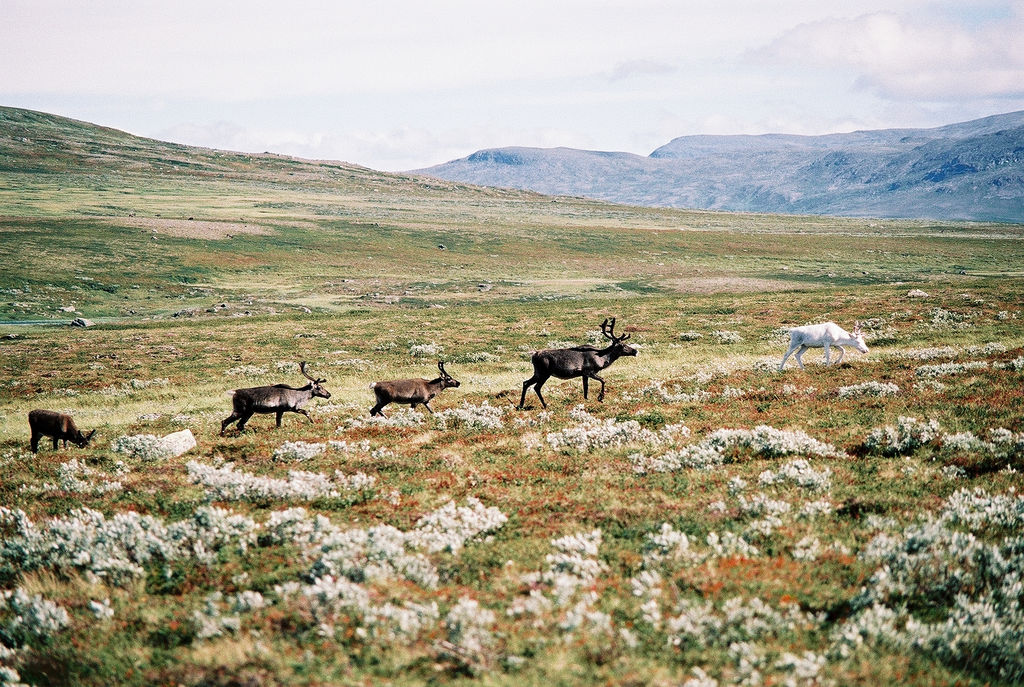
Rangifer tarandus

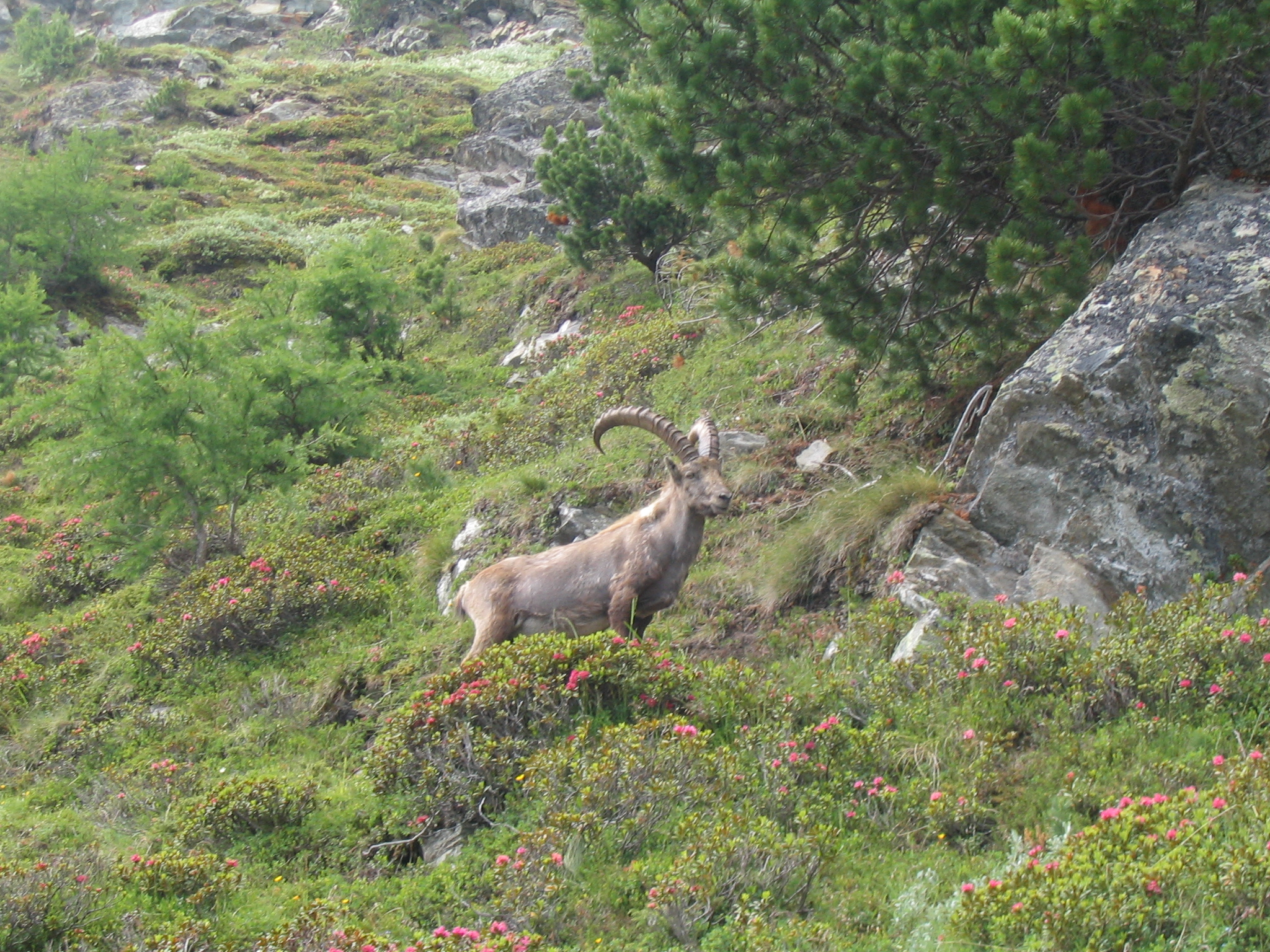
Capra ibex

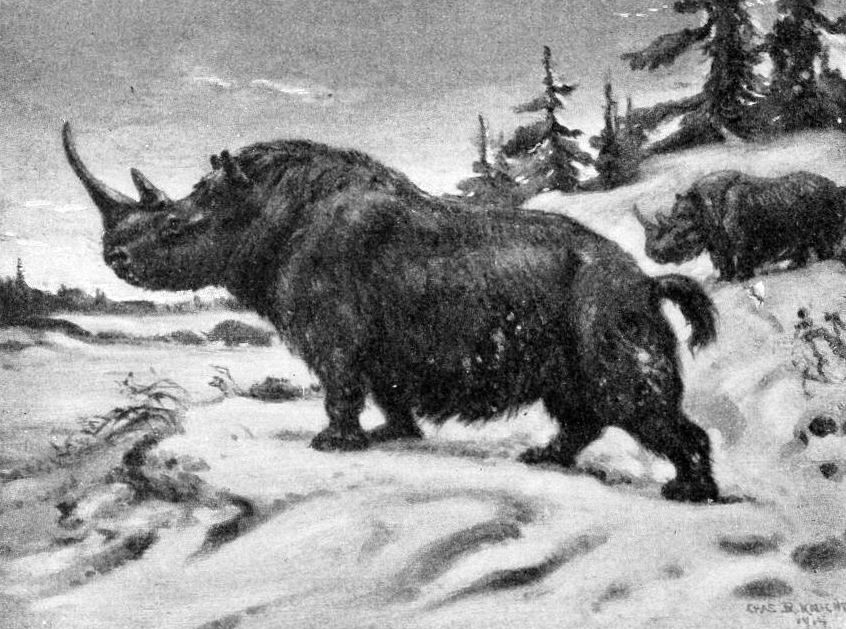
Woolly rhinoceros

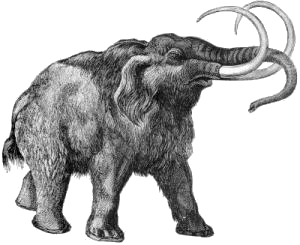
Mammoth
