= Younger Dryas =

Time period c. 12,900–11,700 years ago

- 0.0129 – 0.0117 Ma
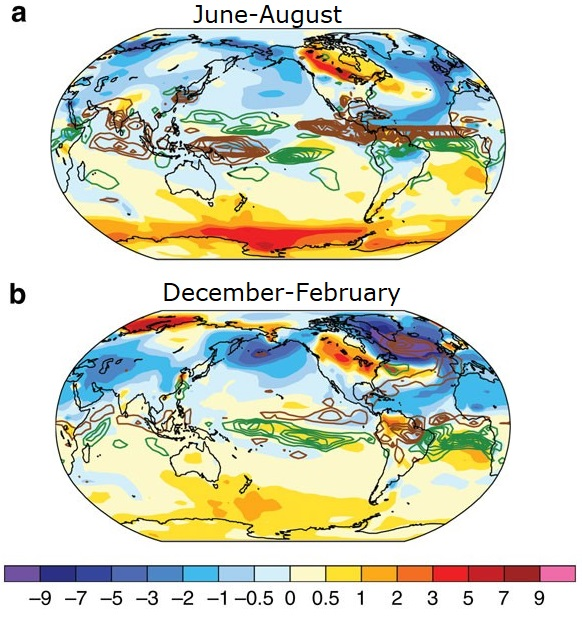
- Significant cooling in the Northern Hemisphere took place during the Younger Dryas, but there was also warming in the Southern Hemisphere. Precipitation had substantially decreased (brown) or increased (green) in many areas across the globe. Altogether, this indicates large changes in thermohaline circulation as the cause

Etymology
- Alternate spelling(s): YD
- Synonym(s): Loch Lomond Stadial; Nahanagan Stadial

Usage information
- Celestial body: Earth

Definition
- Chronological unit: Chron
- Stratigraphic unit: Chronozone

Atmospheric and climatic data
- Mean atmospheric CO_{2} content: c. 240 ppm (0.9 times pre-industrial)
- Mean surface temperature: c. 10.5 °C (3 °C below pre-industrial)

The Younger Dryas (YD, Greenland Stadial GS-1) was the final climatic phase of the Last Glacial Period that occurred from around 12,900 to 11,700 years Before Present (c. 10,900 – c. 9,700 BC). It is primarily known for the sudden or abrupt cooling in the Northern Hemisphere, when the North Atlantic Ocean cooled and annual air temperatures decreased by around 3 °C (5 °F) over North America, 2–6 °C (4–11 °F) in Europe and up to 10 °C (18 °F) in Greenland, in a few decades. Cooling in Greenland was particularly rapid, taking place over just 3 years or less. At the same time, the Southern Hemisphere experienced warming. This period ended as rapidly as it began, with dramatic warming over around 50 years, the transition from the glacial Pleistocene epoch into the current Holocene interglacial.

The Younger Dryas onset was not fully synchronized; in the tropics, the cooling was spread out over several centuries, and the same was true of the early-Holocene warming. Even in the Northern Hemisphere, temperature change was highly seasonal, with much colder winters, cooler springs, yet no change or even slight warming during the summer. Substantial changes in precipitation also took place, with cooler areas experiencing substantially lower rainfall, while warmer areas received more of it. In the Northern Hemisphere, the length of the growing season declined. Land ice cover experienced little net change, but sea ice extent had increased, contributing to ice–albedo feedback. This increase in albedo was the main reason for net global cooling of 0.6 °C (1.1 °F).

During the preceding period, the Bølling–Allerød Interstadial, rapid warming in the Northern Hemisphere was offset by the equivalent cooling in the Southern Hemisphere. This "polar seesaw" pattern is consistent with changes in thermohaline circulation (particularly the Atlantic meridional overturning circulation or AMOC), which greatly affects how much heat is able to go from the Southern Hemisphere to the North. The Southern Hemisphere cools and the Northern Hemisphere warms when the AMOC is strong, and the opposite happens when it is weak. The scientific consensus is that severe AMOC weakening explains the climatic effects of the Younger Dryas. It also explains why the Holocene warming had proceeded so rapidly once the AMOC change was no longer counteracting the increase in carbon dioxide levels.

AMOC weakening causing polar seesaw effects is also consistent with the accepted explanation for Dansgaard–Oeschger events, with YD likely to have been the last and the strongest of these events. However, there is some debate over what caused the AMOC to become so weak in the first place. The hypothesis historically most supported by scientists was an interruption from an influx of fresh, cold water from North America's Lake Agassiz into the Atlantic Ocean. While there is evidence of meltwater travelling via the Mackenzie River, this hypothesis may not be consistent with the lack of sea level rise during this period, so other theories have also emerged. A volcanic eruption as an initial trigger for cooling and sea ice growth has been proposed more recently, and the presence of anomalously high levels of volcanism immediately preceding the onset of the Younger Dryas has been confirmed in both ice cores and cave deposits.

== Etymology ==
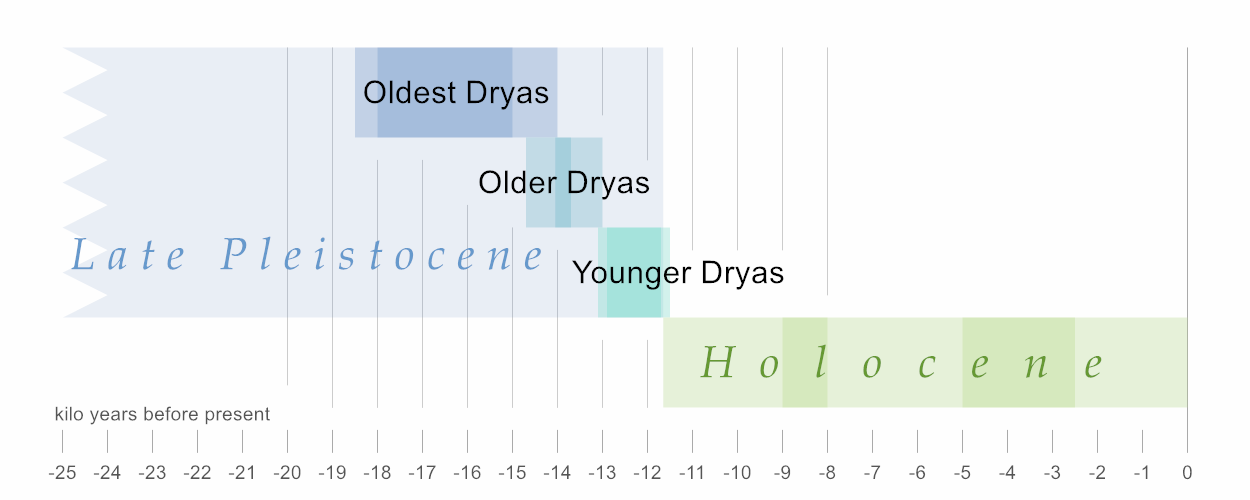
Dryas stadials

The Younger Dryas period is named after the alpine–tundra wildflower Dryas octopetala, because its fossils are abundant in the European (particularly Scandinavian) sediments dating to this timeframe. The two earlier geologic time intervals where this flower was abundant in Europe are the Oldest Dryas and Older Dryas. On the contrary, Dryas octopetala was rare during the Bølling–Allerød Interstadial. Instead, European temperatures were warm enough to support trees in Scandinavia, as seen at the Bølling and Allerød sites in Denmark.

In Ireland, the Younger Dryas has also been known as the Nahanagan Stadial, and in Great Britain it has been called the Loch Lomond Stadial. In the Greenland Summit ice core chronology, the Younger Dryas corresponds to Greenland Stadial 1 (GS-1). The preceding Allerød warm period (interstadial) is subdivided into three events: Greenland Interstadial-1c to 1a (GI-1c to GI-1a).

== Climate ==
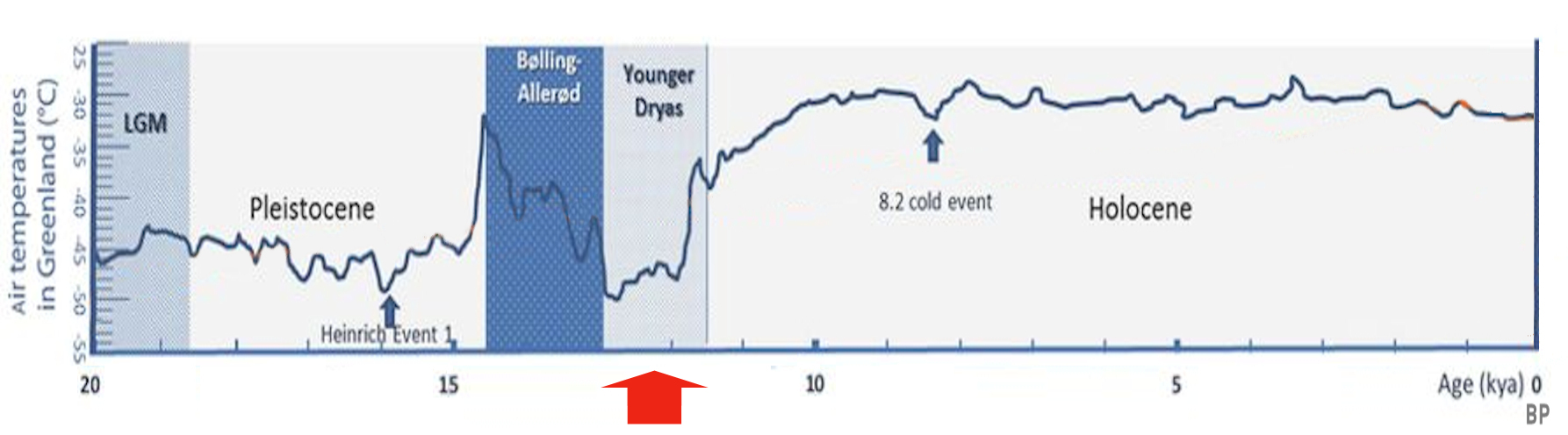
Greenland ice cores since the Last Glacial Maximum show very low temperatures for the most part of the Younger Dryas, which then rise rapidly during the Holocene transition

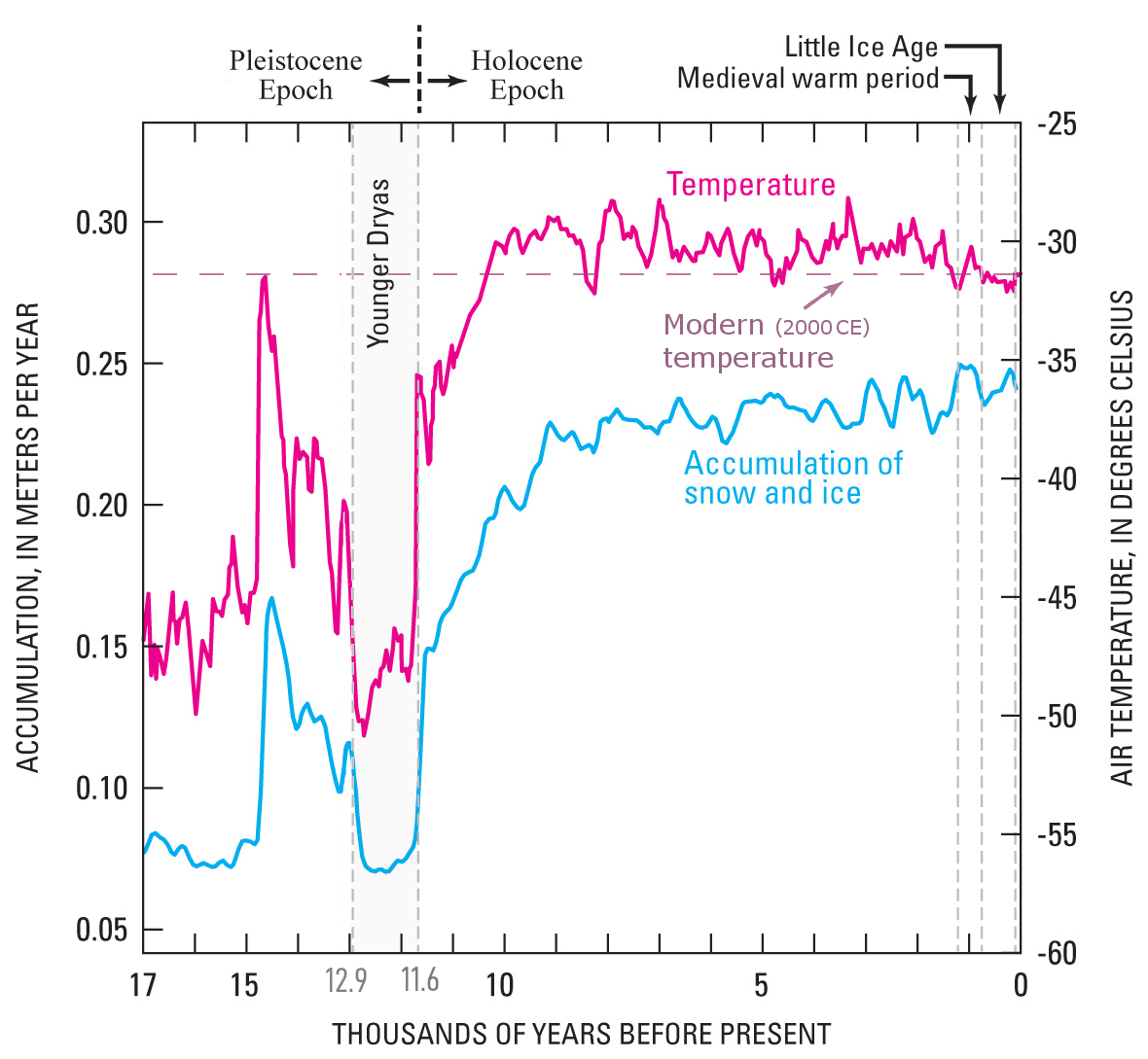
Temperature changes, determined as proxy temperatures, taken from the central region of Greenland's ice sheet during the Late Pleistocene and beginning of the Holocene

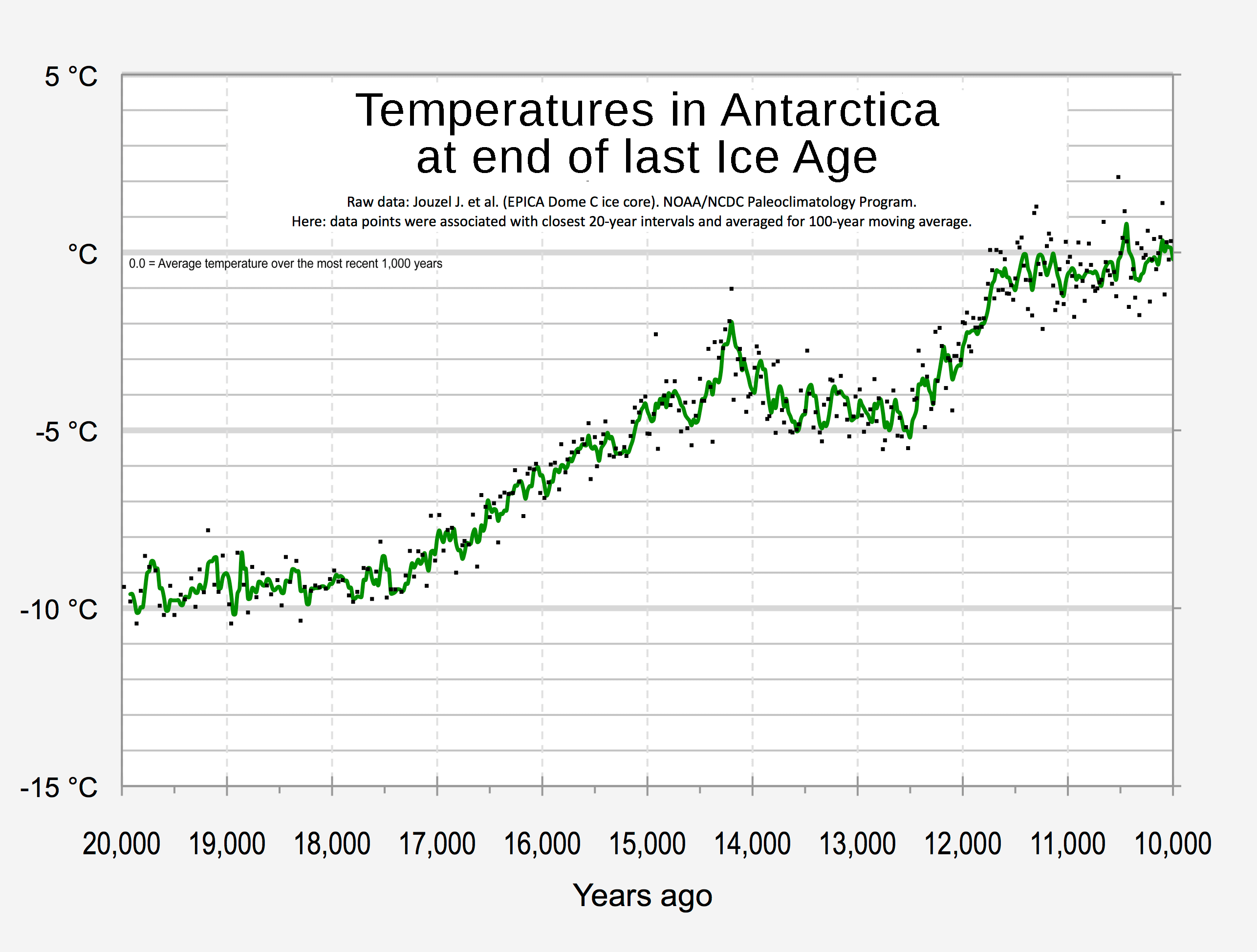
Temperatures in Antarctica, derived from EPICA Dome C Ice Core

As with the other geologic periods, paleoclimate during the Younger Dryas is reconstructed through proxy data such as traces of pollen, ice cores and layers of marine and lake sediments. Collectively, this evidence shows that significant cooling across the Northern Hemisphere began around 12,870 ± 30 years BP. It was particularly severe in Greenland, where temperatures declined by 4–10 °C (7.2–18.0 °F), in an abrupt fashion. Temperatures at the Greenland summit were up to 15 °C (27 °F) colder than at the start of the 21st century.

Strong cooling of around 2–6 °C (4–11 °F) had also taken place in Europe. Icefields and glaciers formed in upland areas of Great Britain, while many lowland areas developed permafrost, implying a cooling of −5 °C (−9.0 °F) and a mean annual temperature no higher than −1 °C (30 °F). North America also became colder, particularly in the eastern and central areas. While the Pacific Northwest region cooled by 2–3 °C (3.6–5.4 °F), cooling in western North America was generally less intense. While the Orca Basin in the Gulf of Mexico still experienced a drop in sea surface temperature of 2.4 ± 0.6°C, land areas closer to it, such as Texas, the Grand Canyon area and New Mexico, ultimately did not cool as much as the continental interior. The Southeastern United States became warmer and wetter than before. There was warming in and around the Caribbean Sea, and in West Africa.

It was once believed that the Younger Dryas cooling started at around the same time across the Northern Hemisphere. However, varve (sedimentary rock) analysis carried out in 2015 suggested that the cooling proceeded in two stages: first along latitude 56–54°N, 12,900–13,100 years ago, and then further north, 12,600–12,750 years ago. Evidence from Lake Suigetsu cores in Japan and the Puerto Princesa cave complex in the Philippines shows that the onset of the Younger Dryas in East Asia was delayed by several hundred years relative to the North Atlantic. Further, the cooling was uniform throughout the year, but had a distinct seasonal pattern. In most places in the Northern Hemisphere, winters became much colder than before, but springs cooled by less, while there was either no temperature change or even slight warming during the summer. An exception appears to have taken place in what is now Maine, where winter temperatures remained stable, yet summer temperatures decreased by up to 7.5 °C (13.5 °F).

While the Northern Hemisphere cooled, considerable warming occurred in the Southern Hemisphere. Sea surface temperatures were warmer by 0.3–1.9 °C (0.5–3.4 °F), and Antarctica, South America (south of Venezuela) and New Zealand all experienced warming. The net temperature change was a relatively modest cooling of 0.6 °C (1.1 °F). Temperature changes of the Younger Dryas lasted 1,150–1,300 years. According to the International Commission on Stratigraphy, the Younger Dryas ended around 11,700 years ago, although some research places it closer to 11,550 years ago.

The end of Younger Dryas was also abrupt: in previously cooled areas, warming to previous levels took place over 50–60 years. The tropics experienced more gradual temperature recovery over several centuries; the exception was in tropical Atlantic areas such as Costa Rica, where temperature change was similar to Greenland's. The Holocene warming then proceeded across the globe, following an increase in carbon dioxide levels during the YD period (from ~210 ppm to ~275 ppm).

=== Ice cover ===
Younger Dryas cooling was often accompanied by glacier advance and lowering of the regional snow line, with evidence found in areas such as Scandinavia, the Swiss Alps and the Dinaric Alps in the Balkans, northern ranges of North America's Rocky Mountains, Two Creeks Buried Forest in Wisconsin and western parts of the New York State, and in the Pacific Northwest, including the Cascade Range. The entire Laurentide ice sheet had advanced between west Lake Superior and southeast Quebec, leaving behind a layer of rock debris (moraine) dated to this period. Southeastern Alaska appears to have escaped glaciation; speleothem calcite deposition continued in the region despite being retarded, indicating the absence of permafrost and glaciation.

On the other hand, the warming of the Southern Hemisphere led to ice loss in Antarctica, South America and New Zealand. Moreover, while Greenland as a whole had cooled, glaciers had only grown in the north of the island, and they had retreated from the rest of Greenland's coasts. This was likely driven by the strengthened Irminger Current. The Jabllanica mountain range in the Balkans also experienced ice loss and glacial retreat: this was likely caused by the drop in annual precipitation, which would have otherwise frozen and helped to maintain the glaciers. Unlike now, the glaciers were still present in northern Scotland, but they had thinned during the Younger Dryas.

The amount of water contained within glaciers directly influences global sea levels – sea level rise occurs if the glaciers retreat, and it drops if glaciers grow. Altogether, there appears to have been little change in sea level throughout the Younger Dryas. This is in contrast to rapid increases before and after, such as the Meltwater Pulse 1A. On the coasts, glacier advance and retreat also affects relative sea level. Western Norway experienced a relative sea level rise of 10 m (32 2/3 ft) as the Scandinavian ice sheet advanced. Notably, ice sheet advance in this area appears to have begun about 600 years before the global onset of the Younger Dryas. Underwater, the deposits of methane clathrate – methane frozen into ice – remained stable throughout the Younger Dryas, including during the rapid warming as it ended.

=== Weather systems ===
As the Northern Hemisphere cooled and the Southern Hemisphere warmed, the thermal equator would have shifted to the south. Because trade winds from either hemisphere cancel each other out above the thermal equator in a calm, heavily clouded area known as the Intertropical Convergence Zone (ITCZ), a change in its position affects wind patterns elsewhere. For instance, in East Africa, the sediments of Lake Tanganyika were mixed less strongly during this period, indicating weaker wind systems in this area. Shifts in atmospheric patterns are believed to be the main reason why Northern Hemisphere summers generally did not cool during the Younger Dryas.

Since winds carry moisture in the form of clouds, these changes also affect precipitation. Thus, evidence from the pollen record shows that some areas have become very arid, including Scotland, the North American Midwest, Anatolia and southern China. As North Africa, including the Sahara Desert, became drier, the amount of dust blown by wind had also increased. Other areas became wetter including northern China (possibly excepting the Shanxi region)

== Biosphere ==
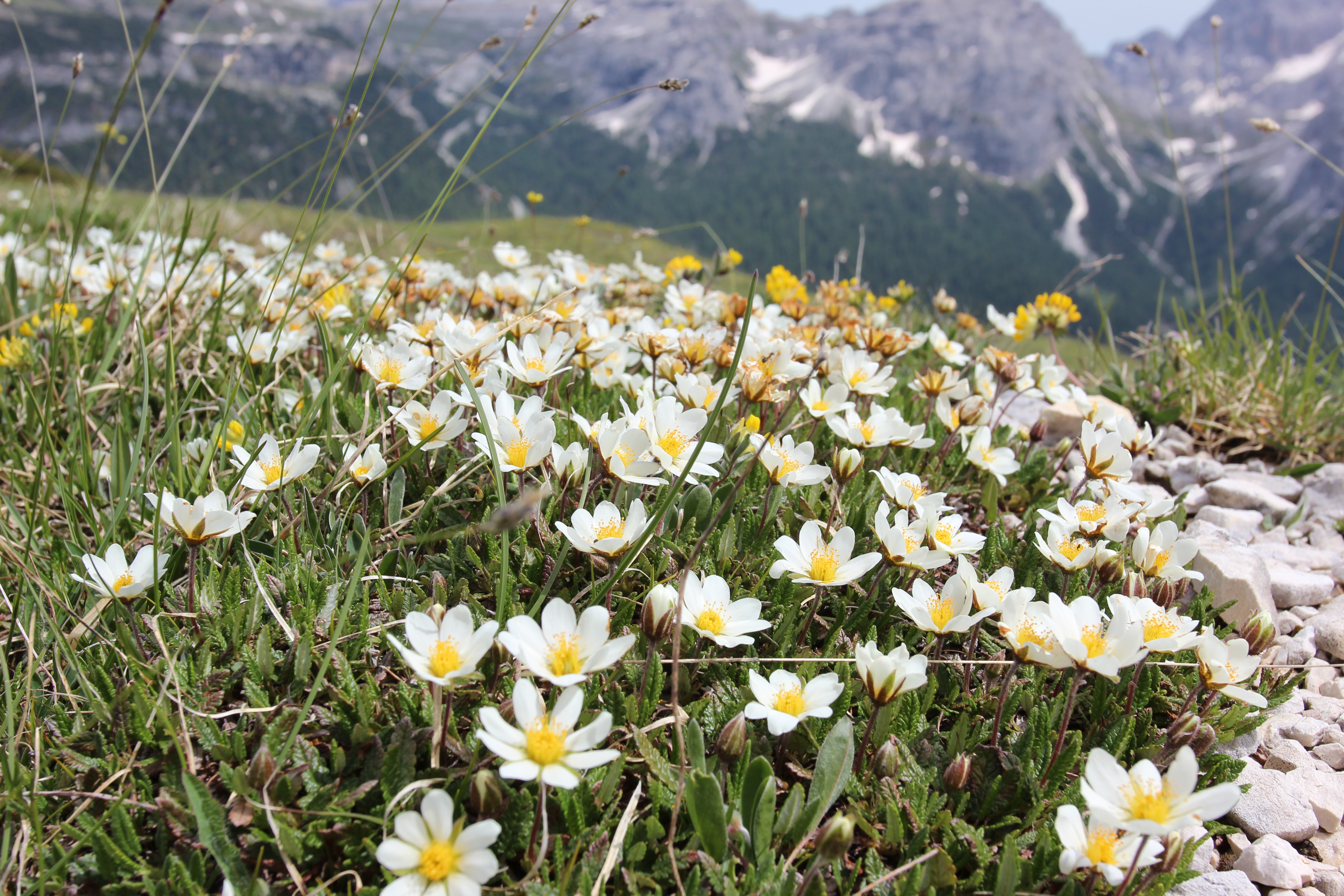
Dryas octopetala is the indicator species for the period

The Younger Dryas was initially discovered around the start of the 20th century, through paleobotanical and lithostratigraphic studies of Swedish and Danish bog and lake sites, particularly the Allerød clay pit in Denmark. The analysis of fossilized pollen had consistently shown how Dryas octopetala, a plant which only thrives in glacial conditions, began to dominate where forests were able to grow during the preceding B–A Interstadial. This makes the Younger Dryas a key example of how biota responded to abrupt climate change.

For instance, in what is now New England, cool summers, combined with cold winters and low precipitation, resulted in a treeless tundra up to the onset of the Holocene, when the boreal forests shifted north. Along the southern margins of the Great Lakes, spruce dropped rapidly, while pine increased, and herbaceous prairie vegetation decreased in abundance, but increased west of the region. The central Appalachian Mountains remained forested during the Younger Dryas, but they were covered in spruce and tamarack boreal forests, switching to temperate broadleaf and mixed forests during the Holocene. Conversely, pollen and macrofossil evidence from near Lake Ontario indicates that cool, boreal forests persisted into the early Holocene.

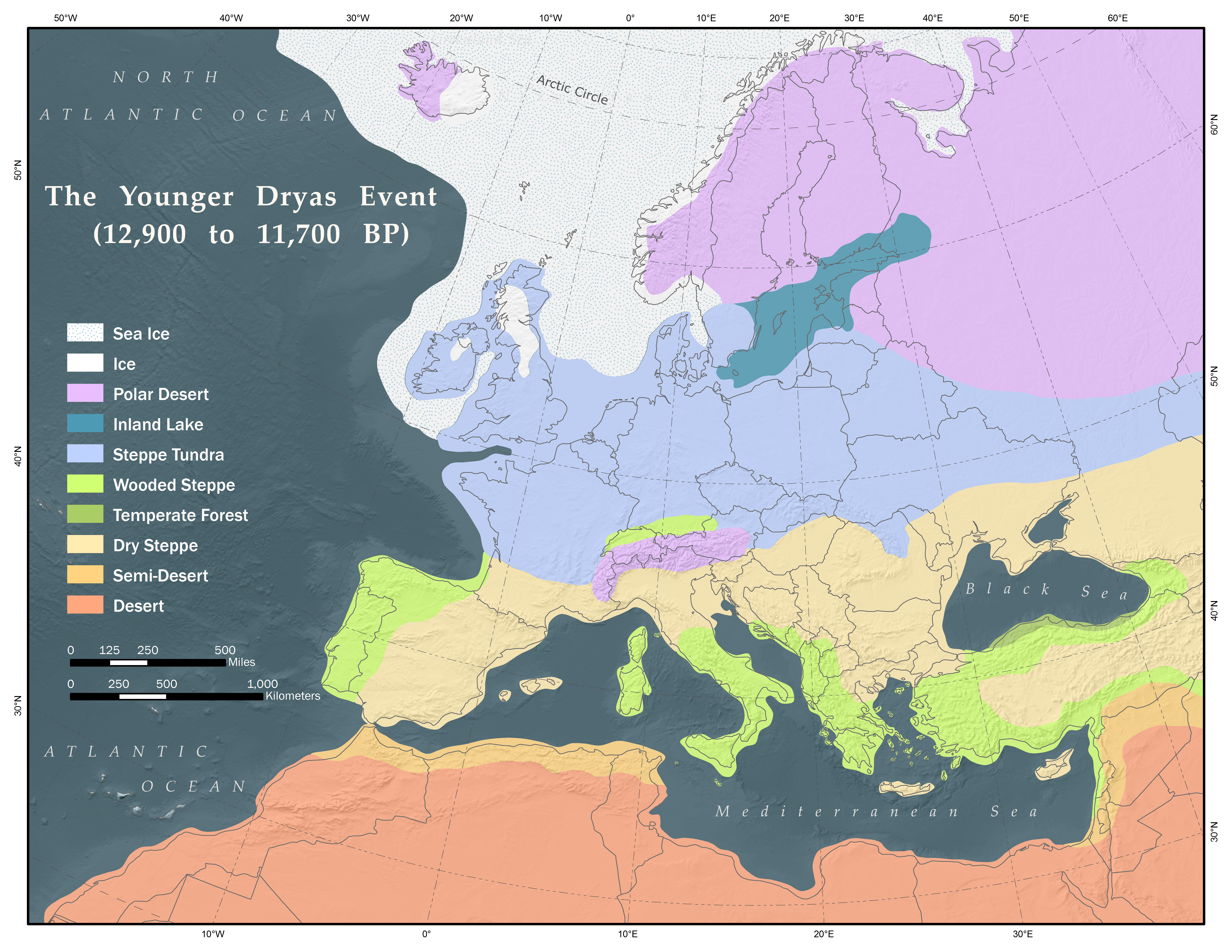
Depiction of different land cover during the Younger Dryas event

An increase of pine pollen indicates cooler winters within the central Cascades. Speleothems from the Oregon Caves National Monument and Preserve in southern Oregon's Klamath Mountains yield evidence of climatic cooling contemporaneous to the Younger Dryas. On the Olympic Peninsula, a mid-elevation site recorded a decrease in fire, but forest persisted and erosion increased during the Younger Dryas, which suggests cool and wet conditions. Speleothem records indicate an increase in precipitation in southern Oregon, the timing of which coincides with increased sizes of pluvial lakes in the northern Great Basin. Pollen record from the Siskiyou Mountains suggests a lag in timing of the Younger Dryas, indicating a greater influence of warmer Pacific conditions on that range.

Effects in the Rocky Mountain region were varied. Several sites show little to no changes in vegetation. In the northern Rockies, a significant increase in pines and firs suggests warmer conditions than before and a shift to subalpine parkland in places. That is hypothesized to be the result of a northward shift in the jet stream, combined with an increase in summer insolation as well as a winter snow pack that was higher than today, with prolonged and wetter spring seasons.

=== Human societies ===
Northwestern Europe faced a significant population reduction during the first half of the Younger Dryas.

The Younger Dryas is often linked to the Neolithic Revolution, with the adoption of agriculture in the Levant. The cold and dry Younger Dryas arguably lowered the carrying capacity of the area and forced the sedentary early Natufian population into a more mobile subsistence pattern. Further climatic deterioration is thought to have brought about cereal cultivation. While relative consensus exists regarding the role of the Younger Dryas in the changing subsistence patterns during the Natufian, its connection to the beginning of agriculture at the end of the period is still being debated.

== Cause ==
The scientific consensus links the Younger Dryas with a significant reduction or shutdown of the thermohaline circulation, which circulates warm tropical waters northward through the Atlantic meridional overturning circulation (AMOC). This is consistent with climate model simulations, as well as a range of proxy evidence, such as the decreased ventilation (exposure to oxygen from the surface) of the lowest layers of North Atlantic water. Cores from the western subtropical North Atlantic show that the "bottom water" lingered there for 1,000 years, twice the age of Late Holocene bottom waters from the same site around 1,500 BP. Further, the otherwise anomalous warming of the southeastern United States matches the hypothesis that as the AMOC weakened and transported less heat from the Caribbean towards Europe through the North Atlantic Gyre, more of it would stay trapped in the coastal waters.

It was originally hypothesized that the massive outburst from paleohistorical Lake Agassiz had flooded the North Atlantic via the Saint Lawrence Seaway, but little geological evidence for this hypothesis has been found. For instance, the salinity in the Saint Lawrence Seaway did not decline, as would have been expected from massive quantities of meltwater. More recent research instead shows that floodwaters followed a pathway along the Mackenzie River in present-day Canada, and sediment cores show that the strongest outburst had occurred right before the onset of Younger Dryas.

Other factors are also likely to have played a major role in the Younger Dryas climate. For instance, some research suggests climate in Greenland was primarily affected by the melting of then-present Fennoscandian ice sheet, which could explain why Greenland experienced the most abrupt climatic changes during the YD. Climate models also indicate that a single freshwater outburst, no matter how large, would not have been able to weaken the AMOC for over 1,000 years, as required by the Younger Dryas timeline, unless other factors were also involved. Some modelling explains this by showing that the melting of Laurentide Ice Sheet led to greater rainfall over the Atlantic Ocean, freshening it and so helping to weaken the AMOC. Once the Younger Dryas began, lowered temperatures would have elevated snowfall across the Northern Hemisphere, increasing the ice-albedo feedback. Further, melting snow would be more likely to flood back into the North Atlantic than rainfall would, as less water would be absorbed into the frozen ground. Other modelling shows that sea ice in the Arctic Ocean could have been tens of meters thick by the onset of the Younger Dryas, so that it would have been able to shed icebergs into the North Atlantic, which would have been able to weaken the circulation consistently. Notably, changes in sea ice cover would have had no impact on sea levels, which is consistent with the absence of significant sea level rise during the Younger Dryas, and particularly during its onset.

Some scientists also explain the lack of sea level rise during the Younger Dryas onset by connecting it with a volcanic eruption. Eruptions often deposit large quantities of sulfur dioxide particles in the atmosphere, where they are known as aerosols, and can have a large cooling effect by reflecting sunlight. This phenomenon can also be caused by anthropogenic sulfur pollution, where it is known as global dimming. Cooling from a high latitude volcanic eruption could have accelerated North Atlantic sea ice growth, finally tipping the AMOC sufficiently to cause the Younger Dryas. Cave deposits and glacial ice cores both contain evidence of at least one major volcanic eruption taking place in the northern hemisphere at a time close to Younger Dryas onset, perhaps even completely matching the stalagmite-derived date for the onset of the Younger Dryas event. It has been suggested that this eruption would have been stronger than any during the Common Era, some of which have been able to cause several decades of cooling.

According to 1990s research, the Laacher See eruption (present-day volcanic lake in Rhineland-Palatinate, Germany) would have matched the criteria, but radiocarbon dating done in 2021 pushes the date of the eruption back to 13,006 years BP, or over a century before the Younger Dryas began. This analysis was also challenged in 2023, with some researchers suggesting that the radiocarbon analysis was tainted by magmatic carbon dioxide.

Work published in 2026 examining deposits at three sites in the North America and advances in dating of both Northern and Southern Hemisphere ice cores is consistent with three major Northern Hemisphere eruptions and one major Southern Hemisphere eruption during the period of the Younger Dryas so volcanic eruptions may have contributed to the change in climate.

For now, the debate continues without a conclusive proof or rejection of the volcanic hypothesis.

It has also been suggested that the supernova that caused the Vela Supernova Remnant could have been a trigger to the Younger Dryas event.

=== Younger Dryas impact hypothesis ===
The Younger Dryas impact hypothesis (YDIH) attributes the cooling to the impact of a disintegrating comet or asteroid. Because there is no impact crater dating to the Younger Dryas period, the proponents usually suggest the impact had struck the Laurentide ice sheet, so that the crater would have disappeared when the ice sheet melted during the Holocene, or that it was an airburst, which would only leave micro- and nanoparticles behind as evidence. Most experts reject the hypothesis, and argue that all of the microparticles are adequately explained by the terrestrial processes. For instance, mineral inclusions from YD-period sediments in Hall's Cave, Texas, have been interpreted by YDIH proponents as extraterrestrial in origin, while a paper published in 2020 argues that they are more likely to be volcanic. Opponents argue that there is no evidence for the massive wildfires which they assert would have been caused by an airburst of sufficient size to affect the thermohaline circulation, nor any mineralogical or geochemical evidence for the simultaneous human population declines and mass animal extinctions that would ensue from such an impact.

=== Similar events ===
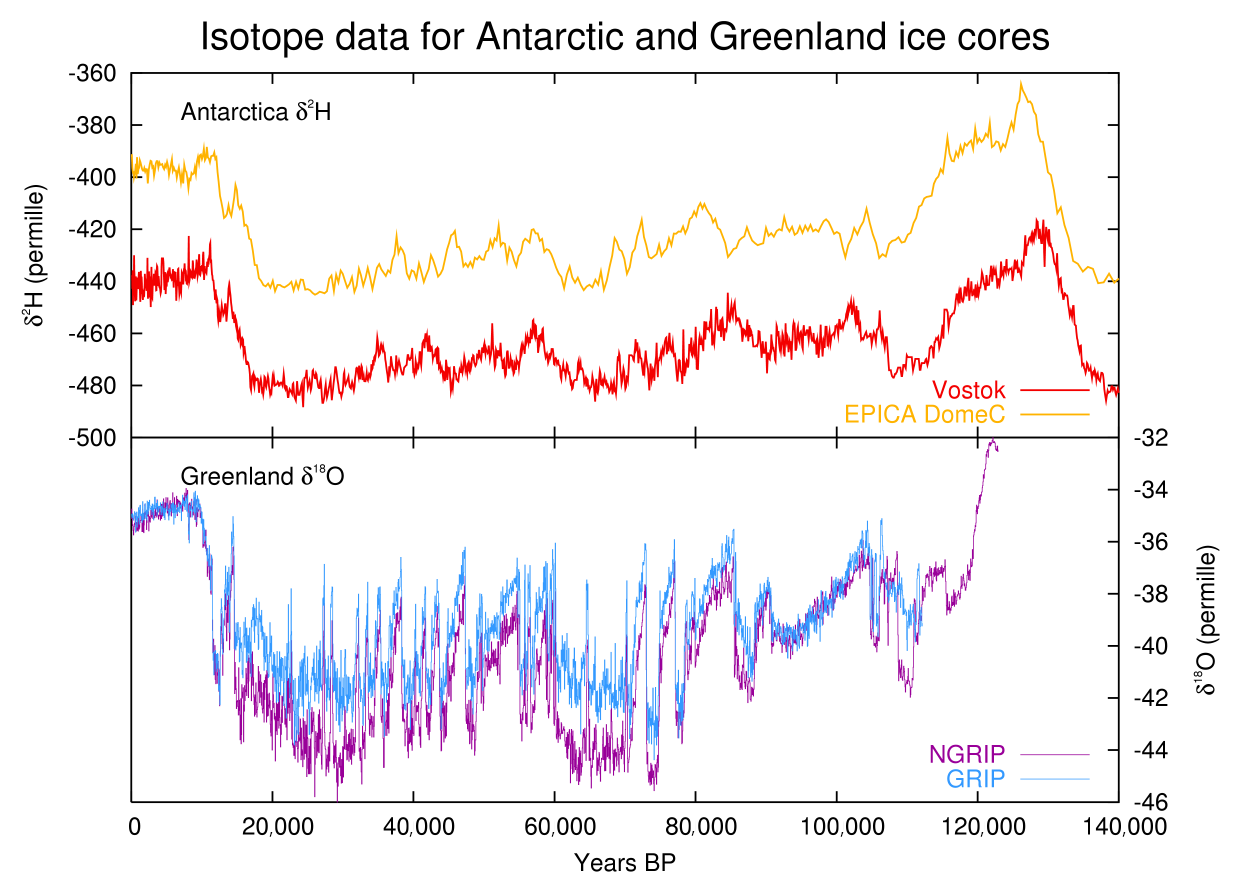
Temperature proxy from four ice cores for the last 140,000 years. They show the distinct "sawtooth" pattern of the D-O events in the Northern Hemisphere, compared to the more muted changes in the Southern Hemisphere

Statistical analysis shows that the Younger Dryas is merely the last of 25 or 26 Dansgaard–Oeschger events (D–O events) over the past 120,000 years. These episodes are characterized by abrupt changes in the AMOC on timescales of decades or centuries. The Younger Dryas is the best known and best understood because it is the most recent, but it is fundamentally similar to the previous cold phases over the past 120,000 years. This similarity makes the impact hypothesis very unlikely, and it may also contradict the Lake Agassiz hypothesis. On the other hand, some research links volcanism with D–O events, potentially supporting the volcanic hypothesis.

Events similar to the Younger Dryas appear to have occurred during the other terminations - a term used to describe a comparatively rapid transition from cold glacial conditions to warm interglacials. The analysis of lake and marine sediments can reconstruct past temperatures from the presence or absence of certain lipids and long chain alkenones, as these molecules are very sensitive to temperature. This analysis provides evidence for YD-like events during Termination II (the end of the Marine Isotope Stage 6, ~130,000 years BP), III (the end of Marine Isotope Stage 8, ~243,000 years BP) and Termination IV (the end of Marine Isotope Stage 10, ~337,000 years BP. When combined with additional evidence from ice cores and paleobotanical data, some have argued that YD-like events inevitably occur during every deglaciation.

== See also ==
- 8.2 kiloyear climate event – Rapid global cooling about 8,200 years ago
- Blytt–Sernander system – Series of north European climatic periods
- Heinrich event – Large groups of icebergs traversing the North Atlantic
- Little Ice Age – Climatic cooling after the Medieval Warm Period (16th–19th centuries)
- Medieval Warm Period – North Atlantic regional climate era, c. 950 - c. 1250
- Milankovitch cycles – Global climate cycles
- Neoglaciation
- Preboreal oscillation – Cooling episode within the preboreal
- Timeline of environmental history
- Timeline of glaciation – Chronology of the major ice ages of the Earth
