= Eemian Sea =

Body of water existing over 100,000 years ago near the modern Baltic Sea

Coordinates: 58°N 20°E

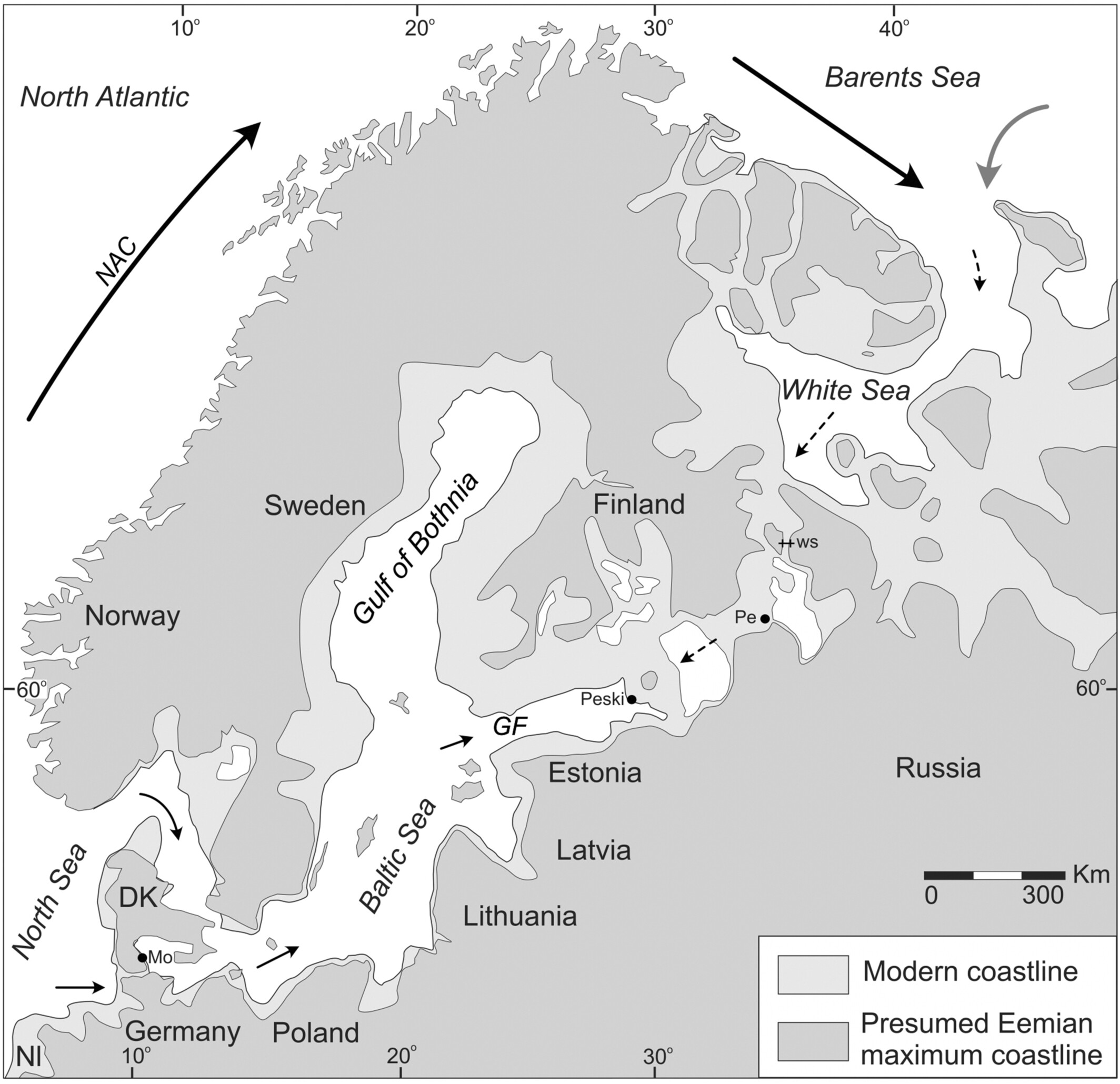
Difference between the exent of the Eemian sea and the modern Baltic Sea in light grey

The Eemian Sea was a body of water located approximately where the Baltic Sea is now during the Last Interglacial (also known as the Eemian or Marine Isotope Stage 5e), roughly 130,000 to 120,000 years BP. Sea level was 5 to 7 metres (16 to 23 feet) higher globally than it is today, due to the release of glacial water in the early stage of the interglacial after the Saale glaciation.

== Names ==
Although "Eemian" applies only in this article to the northern European glacial system, some have used the term in a wider sense to mean any high-level body of water in the last interglacial and others use the Russian term Mikulinian for the northern European events.

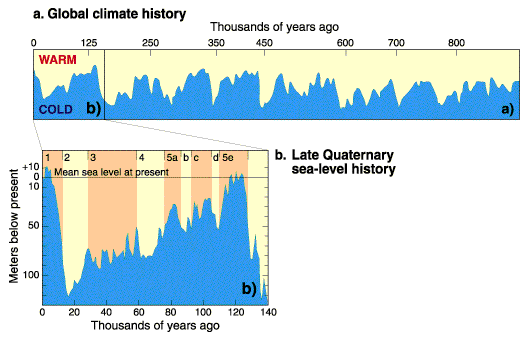
Sea level was 5 to 7 metres higher during MIS 5e, resulting in submersion of much of the Baltic region.

== Overview ==
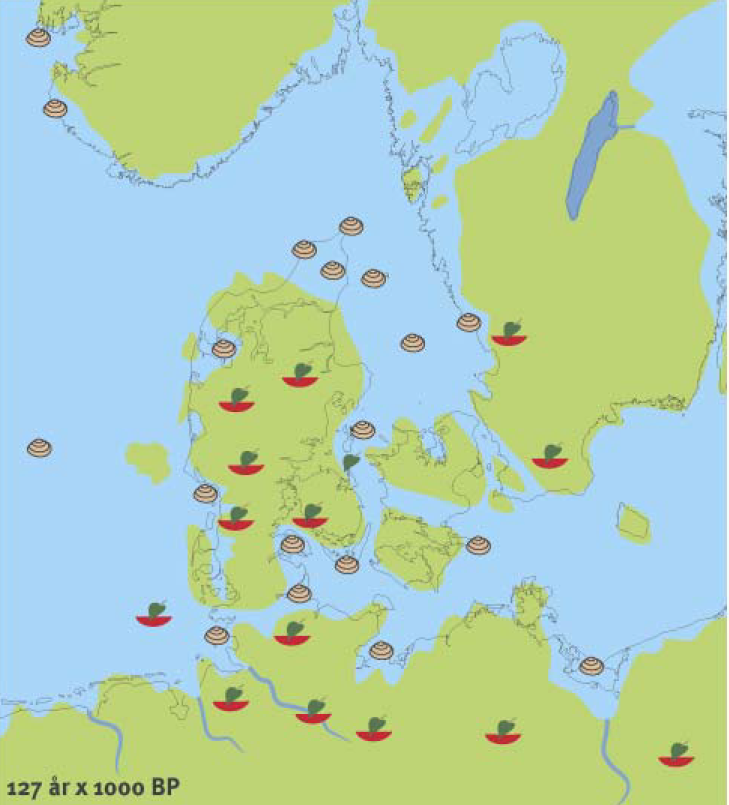
Possible Baltic seaways at time of Eemian Sea. The symbols indicate the type of evidence.

The Saale glaciation (i.e. Saalian), which preceded the Eemian, was larger and greater in extent during its maximum at about 140,000 years ago than the Weichselian glaciation that followed the Eemian period. The dates of the Eemian Sea came from the pollen record in sediments studied at diverse points and at the northeastern studied areas are consistent with the sea lasting about 11,000 years. Western Eemian Sea temperatures were 5 to 6 °C higher than today's Baltic Sea. The last Saalian deposits prior to the Eemian contain pollens consistent with dense pine forest with some deciduous trees. At its greatest extent the Eemian Sea was up to 150 km (93 mi) wide over a length of 2,500 km (1,600 mi). At the Baltic end the sea connected to the North Sea possibly by multiple routes. The marine ingression at Ristinge Klint in the Danish Baltic basin occurred 300 years after the Eemian onset similar to that at Mommark in Denmark. This contrasts with further east and suggests these areas of Denmark had higher elevations at this time than further east. The first transgression that reached Poland, was rapid and appears to have been 300 years odd before the Eemian's usual defined start. Ingression was also late Saalian at Plasumi in Latvia and earliest Eemian on Prangli island off Estonia. This is in contrast to the Amsterdam core studies further south that show as of the late Saalian Holland had temperatures similar to the present, Holland was still under ice tongues at this time with melt fresh water lakes and marine transgression of the Eemian did not start until about 1000 years after the pollen record changed from pine forest. The early Eemian Sea connected with the White Sea along the line of the present White Sea–Baltic Canal. Karelia was inundated and Lakes Ladoga and Onega were mere depressions in the shallow eastern end of the Eemian Sea. It has been thought that the Baltic connection was wider than the Baltic Sea's present narrow straits and so there was a wide and relatively unobstructed seaway from the Baltic to the Arctic Ocean. It has been suggested without proof that a seaway to the Baltic basin existed across Schleswig-Holstein in northern Germany. Whatever the Eemian sea penetrated deep into northern Germany and southwestern Denmark. There is mollusc evidence that suggest the passage to the White Sea was only open for the first 2,500 years of the Eemian, being closed off north of Lake Onega. This area is known as the Karelina Seaway. Several diatom records from northwestern Russia suggest significant salinity for a much longer period and presently in the eastern Baltic region the Eemian sea-level high-stand is believed to have lasted from about 130,250 to 124,000 years BP. In Poland there is evidence for two periods of increased salinity about 800 to 3500 years and 6200 to 6600 years after the beginning of the Eemian, suggesting a two-step transgression in the Eemian sea. The Eemian was not the uniformly warm interglacial assumed by some, as there is evidence for at least a period of 2 to 3 °C cooler summers.

Shells of the arctic mollusc Portlandia arctica in sediments often allow the identification of sediments from the Eemian Sea, but problematically studies need to assign a colder temperature to the eastern Baltic portion of the Eemian Sea than at either the Baltic or White Sea ends. For example during the Eemian the warm water bivalve Lucinella divaricata, which is not presently found north of the southwestern entrance to the English Channel, penetrated far into the Baltic area. Accordingly in the Belt Sea and southern Baltic compared to the present Baltic Sea, temperature was about 6 °C warmer and salinity was 15% higher.

Much of northern Europe was under shallow water. Scandinavia was an island. The salinity of the Eemian Sea was comparable to that of the Atlantic and much more than the present Baltic Sea. Scientists reach these conclusions from a study of types of micro-organisms fossilized in the clay sediments laid down in the Eemian Sea, and from the included pollen of Corylus, Carpinus and Betula.

During MIS 5e, the mean annual temperature was 3 °C higher than today. This was followed by the cooler MIS 5d, c, b and a, with the region continuing to rise isostatically. Some water was recaptured in ice. At least during the MIS 5d (about 118,000 to 80,000 year ago), the eastern Baltic was free of ice and it is possible that the Weichselian ice sheet only covered the area during the Last Glacial Maximum. Levels in the Eemian Sea dropped, and any remaining opening to the White Sea was blocked. Any post-Eemian brackish lake did not last long, being covered with ice. The Weichselian glaciation starting fully in MIS 4, with an interstadial in 3 and a greatest extent in 2, which produced, at its maximum between 20,000 and 18,000 years BP, an ice sheet more than 3 kilometres (1.9 mi) thick. The ice extended southward into northern Europe as far as France and eastward as far as Poland. After its recession, the Baltic Ice Lake appeared.

== See also ==
- Baltic Ice Lake
- Yoldia Sea
- Ancylus Lake
- Mastogloia Sea
- Littorina Sea
- Post-Littorina Baltic Sea
- Eem river in the Netherlands
