= Baltic Ice Lake =

Prehistoric freshwater glacial lake in the Baltic Sea basin

- Interactive map of Baltic Ice Lake
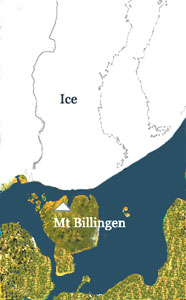
- Late Baltic Ice Lake around 11,620 cal. years BP, with a channel near Mount Billingen through the Central Swedish lowland. (current coastline and political boundaries under historic ice sheet added)
- Location: Europe
- Coordinates: 58°N 20°E
- Type: former lake, subglacial lake

The Baltic Ice Lake is a name given by geologists to a freshwater lake that evolved in the Baltic Sea basin as glaciers retreated from that region at the end of the last ice age. The lake's existence was first understood in 1894. The lake existed between about 16,000 and 11,700 years ago with well defined evidence from the warming of the Bølling–Allerød Interstadial to the period of cooling called the Younger Dryas before the Holocene, the onset of which is close in time to the end of the ice lake. The lake drained into the raising world ocean on two occasions and when water levels became the same on the second, with a sea level passage in the Billingen region of southern Sweden, it became the Yoldia Sea.

== Phenomena related to ice lake and sea formation ==
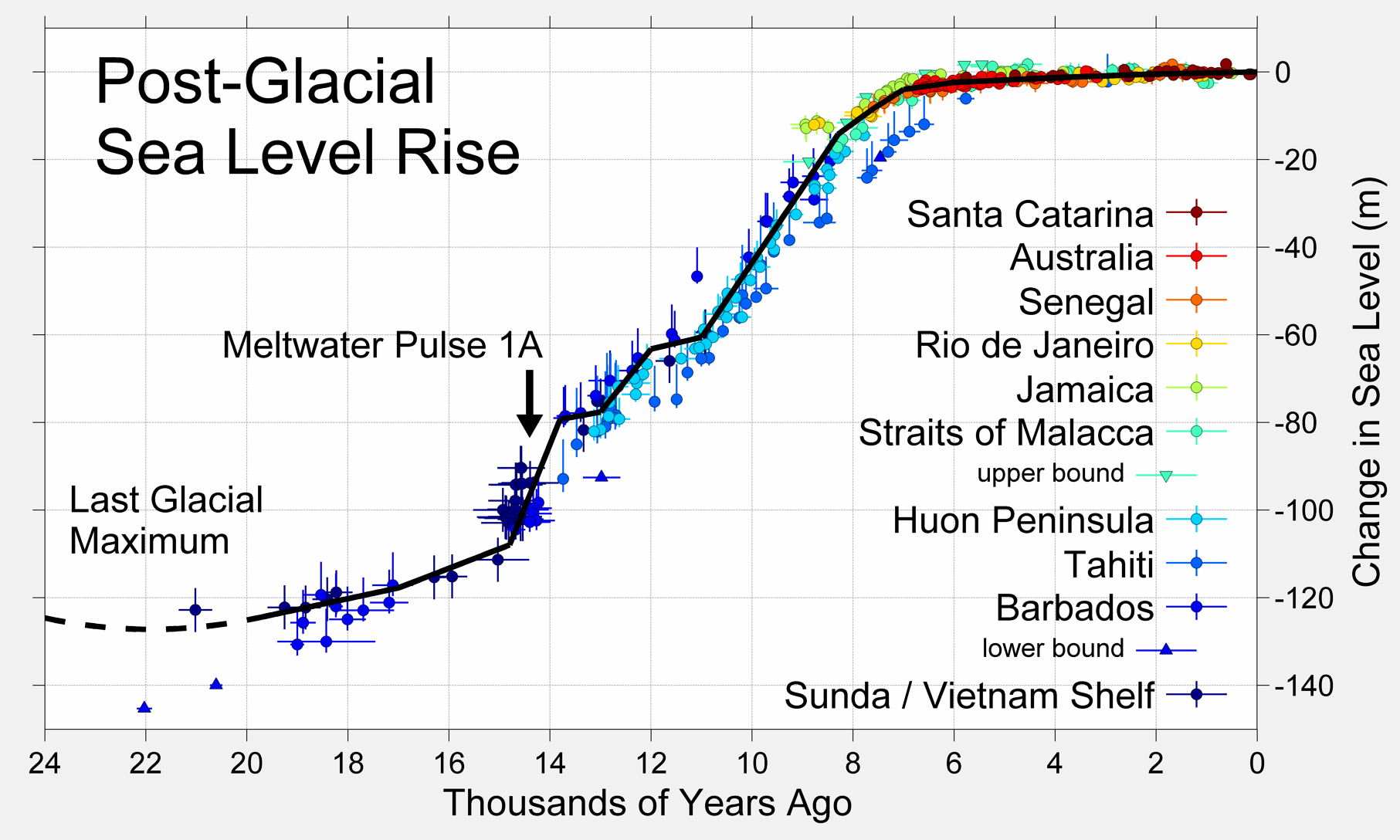
Post-glacial sea level, combined with isostatic rebound, resulted in a sequence of Baltic lakes and seas

The term lake is used to mean a body of primarily fresh water. A sea is filled with brackish or salt water. In the history of the Baltic Sea, the distinction is not always clear. Salinity has varied with location, depth and time. Currently the Baltic Sea has different salinity in layers, seasons and distance from its North Sea connection, as well as mixing events separated by decades. The saline gradients across the area can be assumed to have been greater at times of the massive ice cap melting with earlier seas, but even now there is a marked gradient west to northeast. Seasonal ice cover also is relevant, and forms easier the lower the salt content of the water. Surface waters will tend to have lower salinity than deeper waters and high organic content with oxygenation is more likely closer to the connection to the world seas, if one exists.

The main factors relevant were the advance or recession of the Weichselian glaciation responsible for the Fenno-Scandian ice sheet and the isostatic sinking of the landforms due to the weight of ice or rebound when it melts (springing back, post-glacial rebound, glacial isostatic adjustment), and this was known by geologists to be relevant to the Baltic area by the end of the 19th century, with a flurry of consolidation work in the early 20th century. These processes happen at different rates, often over periods of tens to thousands of years. Timing of such events can have uncertainty and for example the onset of the Younger Dryas is apparently 180 years later in Northern Europe than Greenland.

Melting of the ice cap provides a massive source of fresh water. This was associated with the formation of various glacial lakes and influenced sea levels worldwide, which have risen since 22,000 years ago about 120 m (390 ft). Locally salt water entered from the North Sea through straits when the sea level was high enough to allow reverse flow over the sill. When the straits are above sea level or close to sea level, fresh water will accumulate and a lake forms. Fresh water will accumulate to levels substantially higher than sea level when the sills are substantially above sea level. The release of fresh water from the glaciers depends on climate; the presence or absence of entrances to the ocean depends on land rise and oceanic water level; the latter is also affected by the amount of ice held in glaciers worldwide.

Several methods are used to determine the quality (temperature, salinity, solids content) of ancient sea water. The main one is the type of diatoms found in the sediment. Some species require salt water, while others require fresh. Other invertebrates serve as marker species as well. Also, periods of maximum supply from melt water are marked by low organic carbon in the sediment. Higher carbon content, as occurred after the lake reached sea level, causes greater deposition of iron sulfide, which appears as a black varve. This has been demonstrated well in sediment cores from the depths of the Baltic Sea.

== Stages of Baltic Sea formation ==
The Baltic Ice Lake is one of a number of water stages that eventually resulted in the modern Baltic Sea, and is the first stage after the last ice age. The lake occupied part of the Baltic Basin that had seen many large lakes periodically form during the period between 64,000 and 16,000 years BP in the last ice age. (Note: The qualifier BP is used often for dates as radiocarbon dates are usually used in this article. Where the term should not be used strictly, as with radioluminesence dating, calibration against radiocarbon shows good agreement. Calibrated timings are mentioned where this is clear from the source as cal. years BP. Any uncalibrated dates BP could have true sample age uncertainty of the order of hundreds of years. Dating is an ongoing process with calibration against the tree ring record that exists back to before the Younger Dryas. Other recent calibration dates are the tephra layers of Askja-S (10,824 ± 97 cal. years BP which is 404 years more recent than uncalibrated date BP), and Laacher See (13,006 ± 9 cal. years BP which is 126 years older than a historic uncalibrated date BP often recently used). The new Laacher See dates were challenged, but appear to stand at this time so some sources used have age uncertainty worthy of this note. For actual errors and dating please refer to original sources taking into consideration that intrinsic radiocarbon measurement error is not always a good proxy for the true sample age uncertainty, and sources may not use the latest calibrated dates.) The lake from the first evidence to the last has been dated historically in the range 16,000 to 10,500 years BP, but there is now a defined end point at 11,620 cal. years BP, with sea water entry shortly after, which will be used in this article. The period of the lakes well defined existence from a continuous core sedimentary record extends from the warming of the Bølling–Allerød Interstadial to the end of the period of cooling called the Younger Dryas. The beginning of the Holocene is close in time to the end of the ice lake. The timings, but not sequence of these events has changed in the literature with refinement of dating techniques. (Note: Refinement of dating since proper geological studies of the changes due to the last ice age commenced at the end of the 19th century is enlightening. Present radiocarbon methods now have the advantage of Greenland core studies, tephra and tree ring studies for calibration. Even so in 1899 a temperature maxima at the end of glaciation was estimated as 9000 years ago (i.e. 9,051 years BP) and maximum glaciation at 24,000 years ago by Henrik Munthe, so the change has only been 2000 years either way.) After the Baltic Ice Lake came the Yoldia Sea (about 11,700–10,700 years BP), which has been defined as starting when the Baltic Ice Lake reached sea level so saline water could ingress since Henrik Munthe's work as summarised by him in 1910. In geological time scales this was also the transition from the Younger Dryas to the Pre-Boreal. After the Yoldia Sea the Ancylus Lake formed and this existed from about 10,700 to 9,800 years BP. The Ancylus Lake was 13 to 15 m (43 to 49 ft) above later sea levels, and was first described by Munthe in 1887. This was followed by a transitional phase called the initial Littorina Sea with partial salt water ingression commencing 9,800 cal. years BP, with in Sweden a short but cold regression phase about 8,100 cal.BP, that lasted through to 8300 BP, and through to much greater salinity after 8,500 years BP. The greater salinity is a characteristic of a part of the evolving Littorina Sea called the Mastogloia Sea (about 8,000–7,500 BP), associated with a net 5 m (16 ft) rise in sea level between 8,200 and 7,700 cal. years BP. in which is usually now regarded as one transgression event. Then followed the essentially stable salty Littorina Sea (about 7,500–4,000 years BP), and finally the less salty Baltic Sea (about 4,000 years BP–present day).

== Formation ==
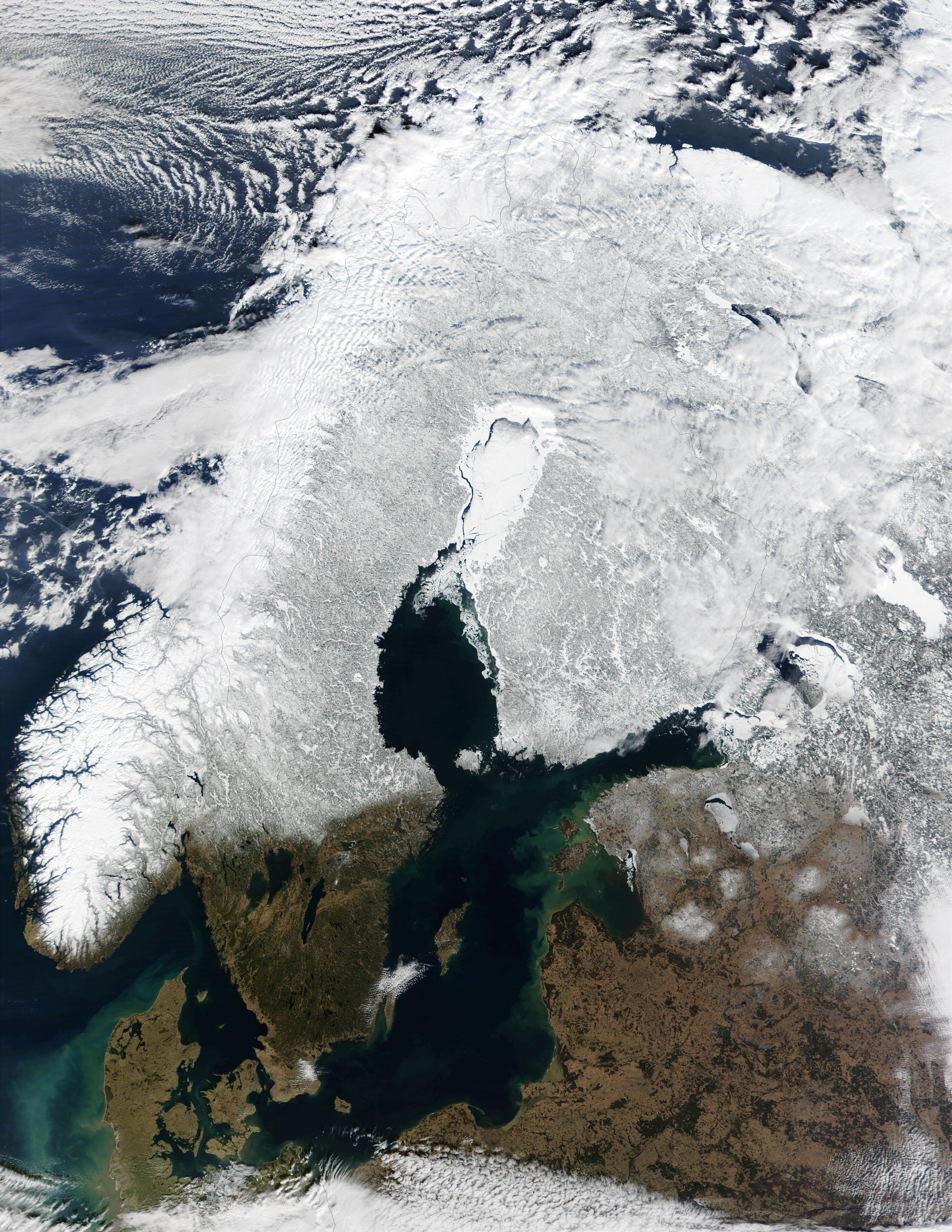
In this winter picture of modern Scandinavia, taken in 2002, the snow line approximates the edge of the glacier c. 10,000 years BP. The lake egressed across Sweden just south of the line, through Vänern, which is visible.

The lake's existence was first postulated by Alfred Gabriel Nathorst in 1894.

At about 22,000 years ago the Weichselian ice sheet was at its maximum and sea level was at the recent low of 120 m (390 ft) below present sea level. In the thousand-year period from 16,000 years BP the edge of the retreating Weichselian glacier departed from the Lake Gardno end-moraines of Pomerania (in present-day northern Poland) and reached the southern shore of the Baltic Sea where closed fresh-water pools formed in the southern Baltic region from melt water as the ice retreated northward. These were about 40 m (130 ft) above the current sea level. The formation of the Baltic Ice Lake in the deepest part of today's Baltic Sea, at Landsort Deep which is 459 m (1,506 ft) below present sea level took place about 13,600 years ago, in the Bølling–Allerød Interstadial. The Baltic Ice Lake covered a large area by 13,000 BC between present southern Sweden, Lithuania and up to Estonia.

By 12,000 years BP, the edge of the glacier was at a line across southern Sweden to the northern shore of the Baltic countries. A connected body of water, the Ramsay Sea, stretched from the Danish islands region to the shores of Estonia. The gulfs of Bothnia and Finland were still glaciated, as well as nearly all of Sweden north of Scania. In the Allerød warm-period, rising land in the Denmark region ponded the lakes in the Baltic basin which may have egressed through a small channel in the Strait of Øresund or perhaps southern Sweden. The lake was higher than sea level (which itself was lower than the present-day sea level) by some tens of metres. Sediment at the bottom of the lake was organic–material-poor glacial clay. Emergence of the land and rebound then closed any channel through the Strait of Øresund. The lake rose and at the end of the Allerød warming event at about 12,900 cal. years BP drained at an unknown location by between 10 and 20 m (33 and 66 ft) before rising again. Other authors have this draining event as sometime between 13,500 and 13,000 years ago. By its final drainage it had extended to much of the present southern Baltic shore line and extended east incorporating the area around the present Lake Ladoga. At the peak of this high-water phase, most of Finland was under water, including present-day Helsinki at a depth of 115 m (377 ft); only southern Sweden was both free of ice and above the waterline. The Danish Islands were all connected west of the Strait of Øresund.

== Final breakout ==
Emergence of the land through rebound after the loss of ice cover then closed the channel through the Strait of Øresund. The lake rose until at about 11,620 cal. years BP it broke through as a glacial lake outburst flood in a narrow corridor in the region of Mount Billingen in present-day south-west Sweden; from the 1920s Quaternary geologists used to describe the break-through as a massive, single tap of Niagara-like force, but there is now evidence that it happened in several steps over a limited period, and along different local troughs and passages, with evidence for all three of ice marginal, supraglacial, or subglacial drainage at various times. It has been postulated that because the ice cap had extended southwards during the Younger Dryas in south-west Sweden, a factor in the break through at Mount Billingen was that rebound was delayed there.

At the start of drainage into the sea here the land was just a bit more than 25 m (82 ft) above the local sea level, and the drainage was both along the ice margin on the east side of Billingen and subglacially near present Timmersdala where recent interpretations are consistent with an ice tunnel existing. Other drainage later took place on the northeast side of Billingen. The flood through the Lảngen valley was over glacier ice.

Currently accepted durations for the discharge range between about half a year to 1.5 years, but some have postulated decades. The peak discharge is therefore moderate for a outburst flood. Flow velocities for the first few months peaked at 10–12 m/s (22–27 mph), with a peak discharge rate of 200,000–400,000 m^{3}/s (7,100,000–14,100,000 cu ft/s).

== Ecology ==
The ecology of the Bølling–Allerød Interstadial when the ice lake formed, has data from multiple northern European studies that may be relevant. The algaeChara spp. are reportedly common in water environments at 13,500 BP with a steep fall by 13,300 and all but disappear by 12,400 BP. Pine and birch pollen is found from 13,200 to 12,500 BP. The Younger Dryas was predominantly tundra, with areas of taiga. Juniper pollen is found between 12,650 BP and 11,200 BP. Non-tree pollens increased, especially from heliophytes. These pollen record shifts of northern Europe due to colder climate in the Younger Dryas occurred later than in southern Europe being between 12,600 and 12,750 cal. BP. The end of the Baltic Ice Lake marks also the transition in Europe to Pre-Boreal forest. There is a marked increase in Pine and birch pollen from 11,500 BP. After this open pine-birch forest covered the region and this is reflected in pollen levels much higher than in the Bølling–Allerød Interstadial. The distribution of species such as the fresh water crustacean Limnocalanus macrurus in high Swedish fresh water lakes has long been potentially explained by seeding when these lakes were part of the Baltic Ice Lake high stand or very close to it. Similarly layers of clay that contained cod fossils or marine diatoms were long recognised as being related to the transition from fresh water to sea water and later raised by sea floor rebound. The significance of the distribution of fresh and salt water species in working out the history of the Holocene Baltic lakes and seas was well understood by 1910.

=== Human habitation ===
The Riadino-5 archaeological site on the lower Šešupė river in the Kaliningrad Oblast shows intraglacial human habitation with flint artefacts existed on the borders of the Baltic Basin between 50,000 and 44,000 years ago. Several carbon-dated sites in Estonia indicate that human habitation of the shores of the Baltic Basin was present in the Boreal period, in the time window 11,200-10,200 years BP. No sites have been identified related directly to the Baltic Ice Lake. The earliest site so far dated is near Pärnu with a timing of about 100 years before 10,700 years BP on the sea shore of the Yoldia Sea, so is just before the occupiers were forced to retreat inland by Ancylus Lake expansion. The earliest stationary fishing equipment is dated to 9,000 cal BP so is well after the ice lake stage.

== Summary ==
At about 16,000 years BP the retreating ice had reached the southern shores of the present Baltic. Melt water formed extensive lacustrine systems still visible today in north Russia, Poland and Germany. By 14,600 years BP a well defined Baltic Ice Lake had come into existence. Beyond it only southern Sweden was potentially habitable. This area was referred to as an island in Greco-Roman literature as "Scandza" or less specifically as "Scandia", which is generally assumed to be an inadvertent misrepresentation by ancient geographers. Southern Sweden was in early historic times, only reachable by water, or when the water froze over.

The area surrounding the ice lake was relatively barren and human interaction has not been proved but is not impossible. As the sediments deposited in the lake were relatively poor in organic matter it is likely that the area of the shore of the lake was less attractive as a food source compared to later bodies of water and did not attract settlements detected later in time by archaeologists.

There was a drainage event, at an unknown location, by 12,900 cal. years BP. at the latest.

Around 11,620 cal. years BP, the ice lake discharged as an outburst flood through channels that opened near Billingen in central Sweden until it reached the raising world ocean level. There is evidence to back all the possibilities of ice marginal, supraglacial, or subglacial drainage. Peak discharge rate was possibly up to 400,000 m^{3}/s (14,000,000 cu ft/s). The Yoldia Sea phase began shortly afterwards.
