= Yoldia Sea =

Baltic Sea predecessor in the Pleistocene epoch

Yoldia Sea is a name given by geologists to a variable brackish water stage in the Baltic Sea basin that prevailed after the Baltic Ice Lake was drained to sea level during the Weichselian glaciation. Dates for the Yoldia sea are obtained mainly by radiocarbon dating material from ancient sediments and shore lines and from clay-varve chronology. Such dates tend to vary by as much as a thousand years in the literature, but were corrected in 2021 for the whole of the Holocene. The sea can not have existed before the final drainage to sea level of the Baltic Ice Lake in 11,620 cal. year BP.

Current rounded estimates are 11.7 to 10.7 ka BP equivalent to about 9,750–8,750 calendar years BCE. (Note: Although some variation in the date reconstructions exist among various sources a full holocene database now exists. The actual certainty is less than the analytic uncertainty shown in say Fig. 6. extracted from the database) The sea ended gradually when isostatic rise of Scandinavia closed or nearly closed its effluents, altering the balance between saline and fresh water. The Yoldia Sea became Ancylus Lake. The Yoldia Sea stage had three phases of which only the middle phase had brackish water.

The name of the sea is adapted from the obsolete name of the bivalve, Portlandia arctica (previously known as Yoldia arctica), found around Stockholm. This bivalve requires cold saline water. It characterizes the middle phase of the Yoldia Sea, during which saline water poured into the Baltic, before the acceleration of glacial melting.

== Description ==
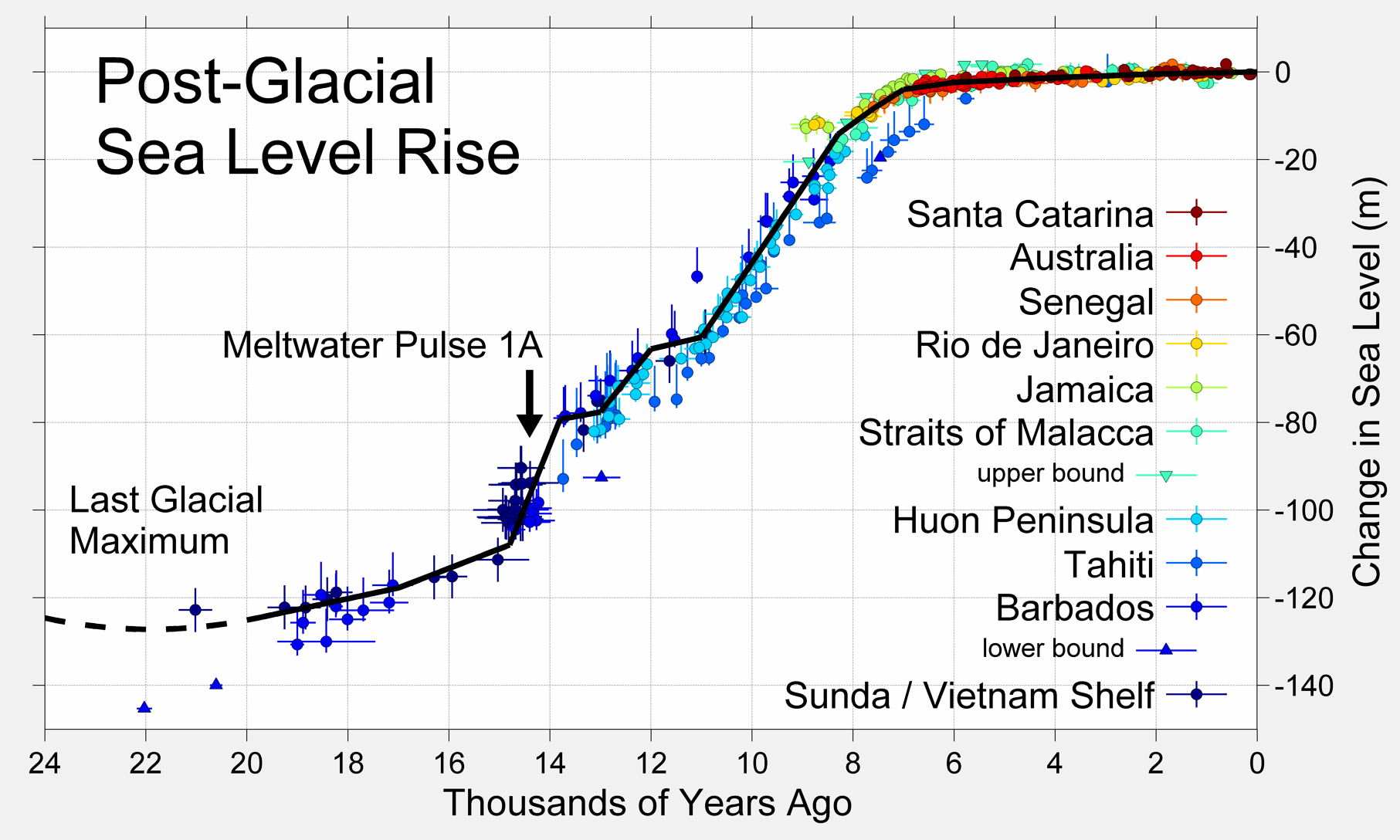
Post-glacial sea level, combined with isostatic rebound, resulted in a sequence of Baltic lakes and seas.

=== Context ===
The Baltic Ice Lake, the Yoldia Sea, the Ancylus Lake and the Littorina Sea are four recognized stages in the postglacial progression of the Baltic basin – there are also transition periods which can be considered as substages. From earliest to most recent they run:

- The Baltic Ice Lake – fresh water proglacial lake with level greater than sea level – dammed by glacial ice until the ice dam broke free at the north slope of Billingen uplands – the lake level then dropped about 25 meters (82 feet) to sea level – at 9,670 years BCE.
- Transition period – Between the Baltic Ice Lake and the Yoldia Sea there was a transient lake stage before the full ingression of salt water. This lasted up to about 400 years, and has been dated based on 292–309 annual deposition varves seen in the geologic record, which depend on where measured along the coast line.
- The Yoldia Sea – a short lived connection with the sea across south-central Sweden over the Närke strait – approximately 9,750–8,750 calendar years BCE.
- The Ancylus Lake – creation of a fresh water lake through uplift, which blocked the Närke strait – about 8,750 to 7,850 BCE.
- The Littorina Sea – with the rise in sea level and the submergence of the Øresund strait, the Baltic again communicated with the North Sea beginning about 7,850 BCE. This is sometimes split into substages:

- The Mastogloia Sea – a substage sometimes used to distinguish the period between about 6,050 and 5,550 BCE, when the Baltic became distinctly brackish – during this period the English Channel and the Danish straits circulation was established, increasing Atlantic water inflow.
- The Limnea Sea – a substage sometimes used to distinguish the transition to the current Baltic Sea to a more stagnant phase, which currently exists – about 2,050 BCE

=== Sea formation ===
The Baltic Ice Lake came to an end when it overflowed through central Sweden and drained. There is general agreement that the drainage process only lasted about a year but no agreement as to when salt water mixing was well established as this depended on factors such as world sea level raise. The straits through the present Stockholm region (via Lake Vänern and the Strait of Närke) to the Atlantic were the only outlet at that time. When lake level reached sea level the difference in salinity caused a backflow from the North Sea, creating saline regions in which the marine bivalve Yoldia flourished. This was the Yoldia Sea.

The Yoldia Sea existed from 11.7 ka BP, but it took about 400 years before the brackish phase that lasted from 11.3 to 11.1 ka BP.

Geographically, the Gulf of Bothnia remained under the ice. The Gulf of Finland was open but most of Finland was an archipelago, over which debris carried by glacial streams gradually spread. A land bridge joined Germany to southern Sweden through Denmark. Relieved of its weight of ice, Finland rose gradually and unevenly from the sea. Parts of the Yoldia shoreline are above sea level today while other parts remain below. The Yoldia Sea toward its end was about 30m below current sea level. A channel at the location of the Neva River connected Yoldia Sea to Lake Ladoga.

The Yoldia Sea existed entirely within the Boreal Blytt–Sernander period. The forests and species lining its shores were boreal. Mesolithic cultures continued to occupy Denmark/south Sweden and the southern shores of the sea. The sea as an ecologic system came to an end when Scandinavia rose sufficiently to block the flow through the Stockholm area and the saline balance shifted toward a lacustrine ecology once again.

After formation, increased melting of ice provided additional fresh water and the sea became stratified (meromictic), with salt water on the bottom and fresh on top. Over the life of the sea and from location to location the salinity was a variable. Whether it is possible to speak of stages of salinity that would apply uniformly to the whole sea is debatable.

=== Sea end ===
The land uplift in south-central Sweden as the glaciers retreated, stopped the water inflow from the world sea by 10.7 ka BP. A rapid Ancylus Lake transgression started then about 10.7 ka BP, and reached its highstand about 10.3 ka BP. At 10.2 ka BP the lake/sea broke through Denmark creating the first Great Belt channels and the Dana River along the new outlet. The total opening was less than 1 km (0.62 mi) wide and included two channels at the northern end. This likely led to an initial lowering of the Ancylus Lake by about 5 m (16 ft). At about 9.8 ka BP, sea level became higher than the lake level, and saline water began to enter the lake to form the next sea phase, the initial Littorina Sea.
