= Astrid Cleve =

Swedish botanist, geologist, chemist

Astrid Cleve von Euler
- Born: Astrid Maria Cleve; 22 January 1875; Uppsala, Sweden
- Died: 8 April 1968 (aged 93); Västerås, Sweden
- Citizenship: Swedish
- Education: Uppsala University
- Known for: Comprehensive studies of Scandinavian diatoms
- Spouse: Hans von Euler-Chelpin (m. 1902; div. 1912)
- Children: 5 (including Ulf von Euler)
- Scientific career
- Fields: botany, chemistry, and geology
- Workplaces: Stockholm University, Uddeholm Company, Skoghallsverkens laboratory, Uppsala University
- Thesis: Studier öfver några svenska växters groningstid och förstärkningstadium (1898)
- Author abbrev. (botany): A.Cleve

Astrid Maria Cleve von Euler (22 January 1875 – 8 April 1968) was a Swedish botanist, geologist, chemist and researcher at Uppsala University. She was the first woman in Sweden to obtain a doctoral degree of science.

== Life ==
Astrid Maria Cleve was born into academic life on 22 January 1875, in Uppsala, Sweden. She was the eldest daughter of the chemist, oceanographer, geologist and professor Per Teodor Cleve and author Carolina Alma "Caralma" Öhbom (known as Alma Cleve). Her younger sisters were Agnes Cleve-Jonand (1876-1951), a visual artist and pioneer of Modernism in Sweden and Célie Brunius (1882-1980), a journalist. They received their early education at home from their mother, one of the earliest women to complete gymnasium studies in the country and a prominent women's right's and education advocate. She was formally educated at a Lausanne boarding school from the age of eleven to the age of thirteen, after which she completed her secondary education at home. Her father taught her the basics of science in his laboratory, where he studied plankton; this formative experience sparked Cleve's interest in diatoms. She obtained her baccalaureate at sixteen. She matriculated at Uppsala University in the fall of 1891 to study natural science; she graduated with a bachelor's degree in January 1894. She then was hired as an assistant chemistry professor at the progressive Stockholm University. While working there she met the German- Swedish biochemist and later Nobel laureate Hans von Euler-Chelpin. They married in 1902 and she took the name Astrid Cleve von Euler. They raised five children, three of whom were born shortly after she left the University, one of them being the later physiologist and Nobel laureate Ulf von Euler. The marriage ended in 1912; seventeen years later, in 1929, Hans von Euler-Chelpin won the Nobel Prize in Chemistry for his studies of fermentation. Toward the end of her marriage, in 1911, she became a teacher in Stockholm's Anna Sandström's women teacher's seminary until 1917. Concurrently, she taught at two other schools: the Norrmalm Högre Realläroverket (secondary modern school) from 1912 to 1914 and the girls' Nya Elementarskolan (New High School) from 1912 to 1916. Cleve also conducted research in this period. After her teaching job ended, she moved to Värmland, where she lived from 1917 to 1923 and was head of the Skoghallsverkens Forskningslaboratorium (forestry laboratory), a subsidiary of the Uddeholm Company; she continued to conduct research there. After her stint there, Cleve and her family moved to Uppsala for three years; in 1933 they moved to a farm in Lindesberg where they raised sheep. In addition to farming, Cleve supported her family by teaching at the town's realskola. In 1949, the family returned to Uppsala, where she spent the majority of her remaining years; that year, she became a Catholic. Through her daughter Karin she was the grandmother of television host and politician Astrid "Lisette" Schulman (née Stolpe). In 1968, 93 years old, she had a hernia operation that she never fully recovered from. Astrid Cleve von Euler died on 8 April 1968 in a Västerås nursing home. Throughout her life, she had many private interests, including French literature and philosophy.

== Scientific career ==
=== Chemistry and early diatom studies ===
Cleve's early research, in 1895 and 1896, included studies of diatoms in the high-altitude lakes in the Lule Lappmark region. She published work identifying and drawing newly discovered diatoms from Arctic lakes. She also surveyed the plant ecosystems in the far north regions and their adaptations to the harsh environment. Between 1896 and 1898, Cleve published four chemistry papers, all of which concerned nitrogenous organic chemicals in varying structures. Her research on ytterbium, also performed at Uppsala University, was published after she moved to Stockholm University; she discovered the atomic weight and various other properties of the element. She obtained her doctoral degree in May 1898 at Uppsala University, 23 years old, on a thesis entitled Studier ofver några svenska väksters groningstid och förstärkningstadium, "Studies on the germinating time and the juvenile stage of some Swedish plants". She was the second Swedish woman to do so, and the first in a scientific discipline. From 1898 to 1902, she was employed as an assistant professor of chemistry at the Chemical Institution at Stockholms högskola (later Stockholm University) which proved progressive in its willingness to hire women. During her tenure at Stockholm, she published a paper on lanthanum and selenium. She left the chemistry department upon her marriage to Hans von Euler-Chelpin, with whom she published 16 papers in the five years after her departure. The couple worked on nitrogenous organic compounds, the synthesis of ketoses from formaldehyde, metal-ammonia complexes, the chemicals in resin, and industrial alcohol synthesis. While a teacher at various Stockholm secondary schools, Cleve resumed her research on plankton, publishing major studies on the flora in bodies of water near Stockholm in 1910 and 1912. These papers are still of significance today as they are the only record of diatomaceous plankton before pollution occurred in the Stockholm area. While still a secondary school teacher, in 1913, Cleve was hired as a biological assistant by the Swedish Hydrographical Biological Commission. For them, she produced a 1917 monograph on plankton research in the Skagerrak strait. After her move to a position in the forestry lab of the Uddeholm Company, Cleve continued to research. Her research there, undertaken between 1920 and 1925, comprised 23 papers on various topics, including the lignin produced during sulfite pulp manufacturing and how to determine the lignin content of a particular wood, the composition of pine and spruce needles, carbon dioxide's role in plants, methods for separating pulp by-products, petroleum, and coal. This work was mainly focused on lignin chemistry, however. Her connection to teaching continued as, during this period, she also authored a popular science book on selenium as well as an introductory textbook in applied biochemistry.

=== Quaternary geology and later diatoms studies ===
Around this time, in the later 1920s and through the 1960s, Cleve's research refocused again on both living and fossil diatoms in the Baltic Sea. Her research also extended into related paleobotanical issues, including the changes in water level of the Baltic Sea, then an inland sea, in the late Ice Age and the period shortly after. Cleve performed boundary analyses derived from diatom studies to determine the changes in the Baltic's connection with the ocean; these are considered to have dubious validity because of the possibility of redeposited diatoms in the sediment. In her discourse with the contemporary Scandinavian scientific establishment, Cleve found conflict as a proponent of the oscillation theory. This theory was first proposed by N.O. Holst in 1899 and was then recycled by Ernst Antevs in 1921. When Cleve refashioned the theory in a 1923 publication it was again rejected by established geologists. The theory held that Fennoscandia's surface had oscillated up and down like a pendulum losing momentum after the Fennoscandian Ice Sheet melted. Her insistence on the validity of the theory at the Geological Society of Stockholm extended about a year until she was expelled from it. In 1927 and 1928 she was involved in controversy through opinion pieces in newspapers with geologist Henrik Munthe. Munthe had proposed to declare "Svea River" at Degerfors a national monument. Cleve argued that "Svea River" should be made a national monument but that it was not the outlet of the ancient Ancylus Lake as Munthe and von Post claimed. The controversy turned personal when as Munthe defended his geological interpretation in the newspapers she responded by accusing him of having unscientific reasons to advance his idea of what Svea River was.

During the 1932–1955 period she published several monographs on diatom taxonomy. The first, in 1932, covered 535 extant and fossil diatom species—including 184 species unknown in Sweden—found in the Täkern Basin. The second followed two years later, after 1932 fieldwork in Lapland; it covered 673 northern Finnish diatom species, many of which were new discoveries. This work led her to geological studies undertaken through examination of diatom flora. That same year, Cleve published on the Quaternary geology of the region. In this same period, she was employed by geologists of the Geological Survey of Sweden to study diatoms in postglacial sediment. She did not produce another major work until 1951, when her comprehensive monograph on Swedish and Finnish diatoms, written over more than a decade, was published. Still in use today, Die Diatomeen von Schweden und Finnland covered approximately 1600 diatom species and their taxonomy, distribution, ecology, and fossils. She continued work on these regions' flora for many years, discovering new species and correcting taxonomy. After her 1945 return to Uppsala University, Cleve participated in the geology department and contributed theories about changes in the Baltic Sea's water level during the Quaternary period. She lectured on diatomology there from 1947 to 1948 at the University's Institute of Plant Ecology. In 1948, she was awarded an honorary degree, as Sweden's first female recipient of the Jubilee Doctor of Philosophy.

Between 1951 and 1955, Astrid Cleve von Euler published her major life work, Die Diatomeen von Schweden und Finnland, spanning across five volumes. As most of her writings, she did so in German. She was awarded an honorary professorship in biology for her diatom studies in 1955. Cleve continued to publish scientific papers until the age of 86.

== Controversy ==
A street named after her in the proximity of the Karolinska University Hospital has been reconsidered for a name change after recent revelations of her lifelong sympathies toward nazism.

== Selected scientific works ==
- On recent freshwater diatoms from Lule Lappmark in Sweden (1895)
- Studier öfver några svenska växters groningstid och förstärkningsstadium (1898) Dissertation
- Bidrag till kännedomen om ytterbium (1901)
- Cyclotella bodanica i Ancylussjön: Skattmansöprofilen ännu en gång (1911)
- Försök till analys av Nordens senkvartära nivåförändringar (1923), Geologiska Föreningen i Stockholm Förhandlingar
- The diatoms of Finnish Lapland (1934)
- Sundets plankton: sammansättning och fördelning (1937)
- Bacillariaceen-assoziationen im nördlichsten Finnland (1939)
- Natur und Alter der Strandflächen Finnlands: Eine spätquartäre Rekonstruktion (1943)
- Die diatomeen von Schweden und Finnland I-V (1951-1955)
- Was war der Svea älv? (1957)
