= Ulf von Euler =

Swedish physiologist and pharmacologist (1905–1983)

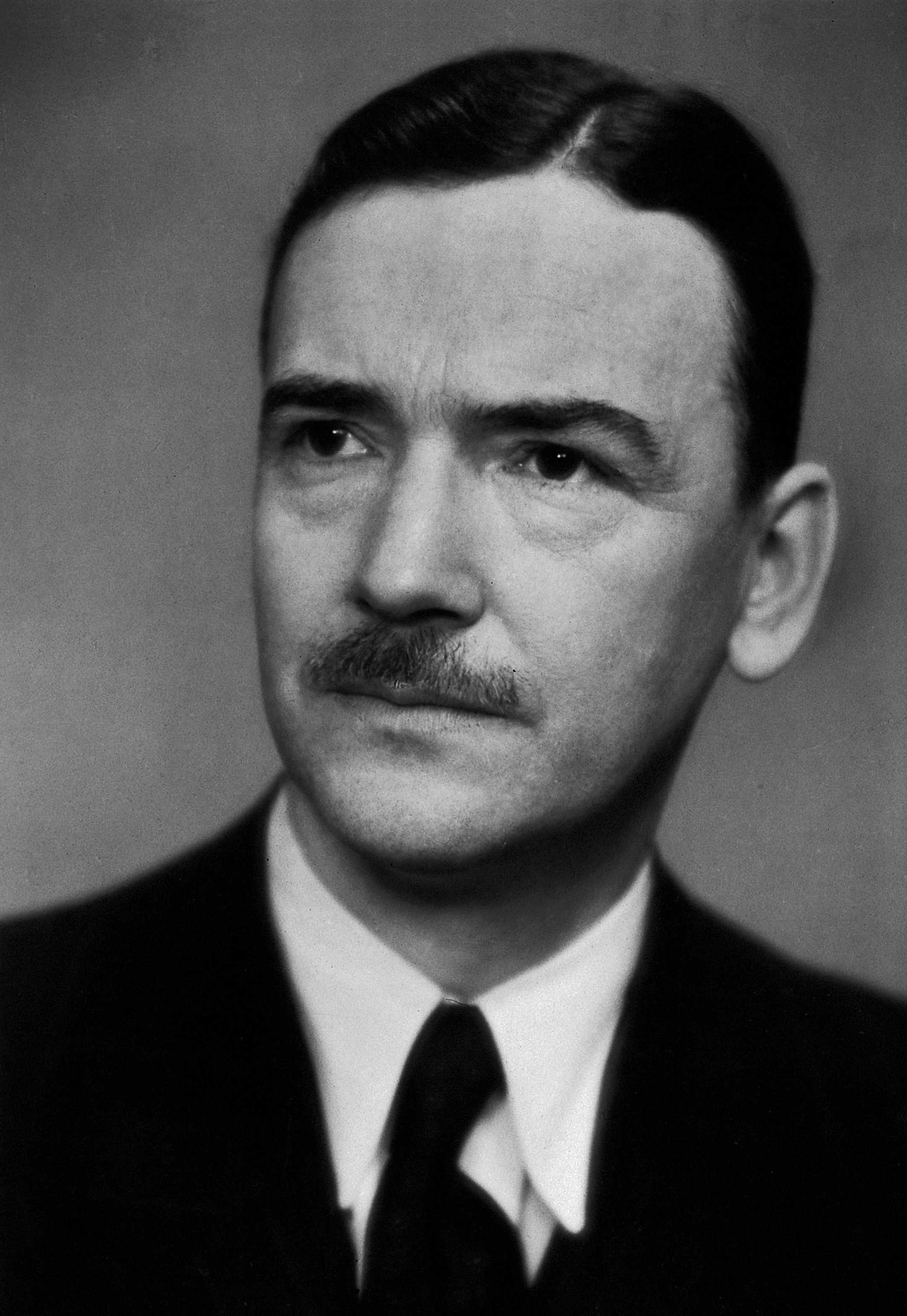
- Born: Ulf Svante von Euler-Chelpin; 7 February 1905; Stockholm, Sweden
- Died: 9 March 1983 (aged 78); Stockholm, Sweden
- Education: Karolinska Institutet
- Known for: Neurotransmitters; Norepinephrine; Prostaglandin
- Spouses: Jane Sodenstierna (m. 1930; div. 1957) Dagmar Cronstedt (m. 1958)
- Children: 4
- Awards: Gairdner Foundation International Award (1961); Nobel Prize in Physiology or Medicine (1970); ForMemRS (1973)
- Scientific career
- Fields: Physiologist, Pharmacologist
- Workplaces: Karolinska Institutet
- Academic advisors: Robin Fåhraeus; Henry Dale

Ulf Svante von EulerForMemRS (7 February 1905 – 9 March 1983) was a Swedish physiologist and pharmacologist. He shared the Nobel Prize in Physiology or Medicine in 1970 for his work on neurotransmitters.

== Life ==
Ulf Svante von Euler-Chelpin was born in Stockholm, the son of two noted scientists, Hans von Euler-Chelpin, a professor of chemistry, and Astrid Cleve, a professor of botany and geology. His father was German and the recipient of Nobel Prize for Chemistry in 1929, and his maternal grandfather was Per Teodor Cleve, Professor of Chemistry at the Uppsala University, and the discoverer of the chemical elements thulium and holmium. Von Euler-Chelpin studied medicine at the Karolinska Institute in 1922. At Karolinska, he worked under Robin Fåhraeus in blood sedimentation and rheology and did research work on the pathophysiology of vasoconstriction. He presented his doctoral thesis in 1930, and was appointed as assistant professor in pharmacology in the same year, with the support of G. Liljestrand. From 1930 to 1931, von Euler-Chelpin got a Rochester Fellowship to do his post-doctoral studies abroad. He studied in England with Sir Henry Dale in London and with I. de Burgh Daly in Birmingham, and then proceeded to the continent, studying with Corneille Heymans in Ghent, Belgium and with Gustav Embden in Frankfurt, Germany. Von Euler liked to travel, so he also worked and learned biophysics with Archibald Vivian Hill, again in London in 1934, and neuromuscular transmission with G. L. Brown in 1938. From 1946 to 1947, he worked with Eduardo Braun-Menéndez in the Instituto de Biología y Medicina Experimental in Buenos Aires, which was founded by Bernardo Houssay. His unerring instinct to work with important scientific leaders and fields was to be proved by the fact that Dale, Heymans, Hill and Houssay went to receive the Nobel prize in physiology or medicine.

In 1981, von Euler became a founding member of the World Cultural Council.

From 1930 to 1957, von Euler was married to Jane Anna Margarethe Sodenstierna. They had four children: Hans Leo, scientist administrator at the US National Institutes of Health; Johan Christopher, anesthesiologist, Serafimer Hospital, Stockholm; Ursula Katarina, Ph.D., curator at The Royal Collections, The Royal Court, Stockholm, Sweden; and Marie Jane, Chemical Engineer, Melbourne, Australia. In 1958, von Euler married countess Dagmar Cronstedt, a radio broadcaster who had during the Second World War worked at Radio Königsberg, broadcasting German propaganda to neutral Sweden.

== Research ==
His short stay as a postdoctoral student in Dale's laboratory was very fruitful: in 1931 he discovered with John H. Gaddum an important autopharmacological principle, substance P. After returning to Stockholm, von Euler pursued further this line of research, and successively discovered four other important endogenous active substances, prostaglandin, vesiglandin (1935), piperidine (1942) and noradrenaline (1946).

In 1939 von Euler was appointed full professor of physiology at the Karolinska Institute, where he remained until 1971. His early collaboration with Liljestrand had led to an important discovery, which was named the Euler–Liljestrand mechanism (a physiological arterial shunt in response to the decrease in local oxygenation of the lungs).

From 1946 on, however, when noradrenaline (abbreviated NA or NAd) was discovered, von Euler devoted most of his research work to this area. He and his group studied thoroughly its distribution and fate in biological tissues and in the nervous system in physiological and pathological conditions, and found that noradrenaline was produced and stored in nerve synaptic terminals in intracellular vesicles, a key discovery which changed dramatically the course of many researches in the field. In 1970 he was distinguished with the Nobel Prize for his work, jointly with Sir Bernard Katz and Julius Axelrod. Since 1953 he was very active in the Nobel Foundation, being a member of the Nobel Committee for Physiology or Medicine and chairman of the board since 1965. He also served as vice-president of the International Union of Physiological Sciences from 1965 to 1971. Among the many honorary titles and prizes he received in addition to the Nobel, were the Gairdner Prize (1961), the Jahre Prize (1965), the Stouffer Prize (1967), the Carl Ludwig Medaille (1953), the Schmiedeberg Plaquette (1969), La Madonnina (1970), many honorary doctorates from universities around the world, and the membership to several erudite, medical and scientific societies. He was elected a member of the American Philosophical Society in 1970, a member of both the American Academy of Arts and Sciences and the United States National Academy of Sciences in 1972, and a Foreign Member of the Royal Society (ForMemRS) in 1973.

Non-profit organization positions
| Preceded by Bertil Lindblad | Chairman of the Nobel Foundation; 1965–1975 | Succeeded by Sune Bergström |
