= Saksunarvatn tephra =

Volcanic ejecta that formed an ash layer

In tephrochronology, the Saksunarvatn tephra is volcanic ejecta forming an ash layer that is useful in dating Northern European sediment layers that were laid down during the Boreal period, the warm climate phase that followed the cold snap of the Younger Dryas as the earth made the transition from the last Pleistocene glaciation to the current interglacial, or Holocene. This was a period of rapid climatic transitions around the North Atlantic, some of which took place during a matter of decades. Similar effects are evident in independent palaeoclimatic reconstructions obtained from pollen zones, marine and ice-core records, but these sequences cannot be reliably calibrated with one another. The ash layer from a specific volcanic event, deposited simultaneously over wide areas, provides a common reference point or time marker called a horizon, which establishes simultaneity in the sequences wherever that layer is found: this set of techniques is called tephrochronology.

Radiocarbon dating establishes a date for the Saksunarvatn tephra of ca 10.200 years BP calibrated, during the late Pre-Boreal climatic phase of rapid warming. The source of the tephra is Grímsvötn, an active subglacial volcano in Iceland which produced a VEI-6 eruption at the time of its deposition. The name commemorates the site where the ash layer was initially recognized, Lake Saksunarvatn on the island of Streymoy in the Faroe Islands, described by Waagstein and Johansen, 1968. Evidence for the eruption can be found in many regions, for example in northern Germany (in lake sediments). Lakes in northern Germany have been used to show that the eruption was followed by a 15-year cooling event.
