= Hans von Euler-Chelpin =

Swedish scientist (1873–1964)

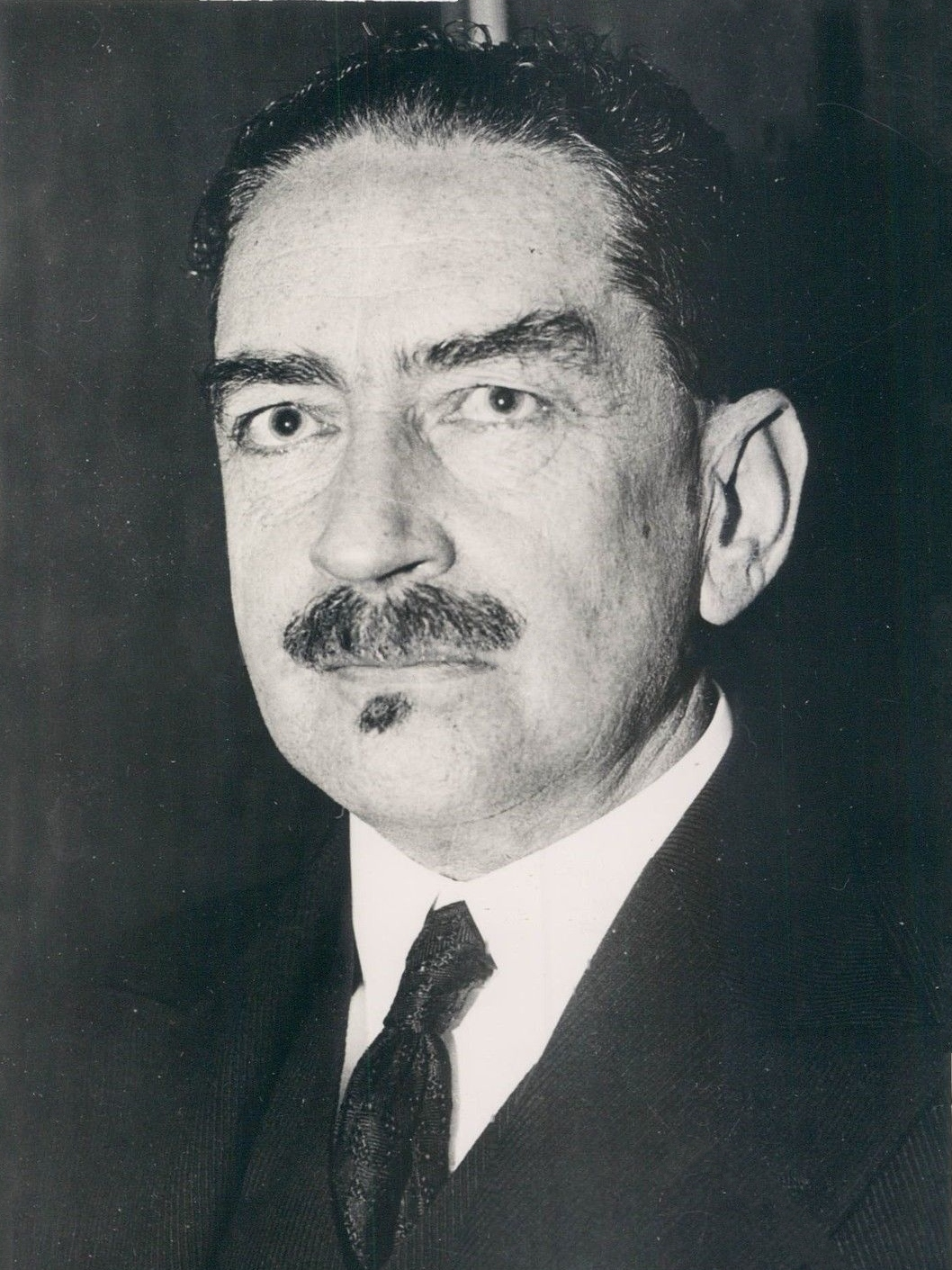
- Euler-Chelpin, May 1934
- Born: Hans Karl August Simon von Euler-Chelpin; 15 February 1873; Augsburg, Kingdom of Bavaria, German Empire
- Died: 6 November 1964 (aged 91); Stockholm, Sweden
- Education: University of Berlin
- Spouses: Astrid Cleve (m. 1902; div. 1912) Elisabeth af Ugglas (m. 1913)
- Children: 9 (including Ulf von Euler)
- Awards: Nobel Prize for Chemistry (1929)
- Scientific career
- Fields: Chemistry
- Workplaces: Stockholm University
- Doctoral advisor: Carl Friedheim
- Other academic advisors: Emil Fischer

Hans Karl August Simon Euler-Chelpin, since 28 July 1884 von Euler-Chelpin (15 February 1873 – 6 November 1964), was a German-born Swedish biochemist. He won the Nobel Prize in Chemistry in 1929 with Arthur Harden for their investigations on the fermentation of sugar and enzymes. He was a professor of general and organic chemistry at Stockholm University (1906–1941) and the director of its Institute for organic-chemical research (1938–1948). Euler-Chelpin was distantly related to Leonhard Euler. He married chemist Astrid Cleve, the daughter of the Uppsala chemist Per Teodor Cleve. In 1970, their son Ulf von Euler, was awarded the Nobel Prize in Physiology or Medicine.

== Personal life ==
Euler-Chelpin was born on 15 February 1873 at Augsburg, Germany to Rigas Georg Sebastian von Euler-Chelpin and Gabriele von Euler-Chelpin (née Furtner). His father was at the time captain in the Royal Bavarian Infantry Guard Regiment (Königlich Bayerisches Infanterie-Leib-Regiment), who was soon transferred to Munich and would finally become a lieutenant general (Generalleutnant). During his childhood, he spent most of his time with his grandmother at Wasserburg am Inn. He went to the Royal Junior High School in Augsburg (predecessor of Holbein Gymnasium ), also in Würzburg and Ulm. After serving as a one-year volunteer in the Bavarian first Field Artillery Regiment, he took interest in the color theory and began studying art at the Munich Academy of Painting (1891–1893). He was taught under Schmid-Reutte and Lenbach, a German painter of realist style. He thereafter went to attend the University of Berlin to study chemistry under Emil Fischer and A. Rosenheim, and physics under E. Warburg and Max Planck; where in 1895 he received his doctorate.

In 1899, von Euler-Chelpin was appointed to teach as Privatdozent in the Royal University at Stockholm where he began visiting the laboratory of van 't Hoff, one of the many who influenced Euler-Chelpin's interest in science along with Nernst.

In 1902, he took Swedish citizenship, although keeping his German citizenship. Nevertheless, during the First World War, von Euler-Chelpin took part in voluntary service with the Imperial German Army in the artillery (1. Feldartillerie-Regiment) of the Bavarian Army, transferring to the Luftstreitkräfte in 1915, finally with the rank as captain (Hauptmann). During the Second World War, he worked in a diplomatic mission on the German side.

In 1906, he was appointed Professor of General and Organic Chemistry in the Royal University, Stockholm. In 1929, the Knut and Alice Wallenberg Foundation and the International Education Board of the Rockefeller Foundation established in Stockholm the Vitamin Institute and Institute of Biochemistry, and Euler-Chelpin was appointed as its director. In 1941 he retired from teaching, but continued his research.

Hans von Euler-Chelpin married twice. His first wife was Astrid Cleve, who was the first Swedish woman to obtain a doctoral degree of science. They had five children: Sten (1903–1991), Ulf Svante (1905–1983), Karin Maria (1907–2003), Hans Georg Rigas (1908–2003) and Birgit (1910–2000). In 1913 he married again to his second wife, Elisabeth "Beth" Baroness af Ugglas (1887–1973), whose participated in collaborations with Euler-Chelpin. They had four children: Rolf Sebastian Ugglas (1914–2005), Hans Roland Ugglas (1916–2013), Curt Leonhard Ugglas (1918–2001) and Johan Erik Ugglas "Jan" (1929–1954). His son, Ulf von Euler, was a well-known physiologist and in 1970 he received a Nobel Prize for his research on the chemical nature of norepinephrine on the synapses. In 1931, his daughter Karin von Euler-Chelpin married the writer Sven Stolpe and had four children with him (one of which was Lisette Schulman).

During his life, von Euler-Chelpin created a series of monographs such as Biochemistry of Tumours, written in collaboration with Boleslaw Skarzynski, published in 1942 and the other entitled The Chemotherapy and Prophylaxis of Cancer, published in 1962.

von Euler-Chelpin died in Stockholm on 6 November 1964, at the age of 91.

== Nobel Prize ==
In 1929, Euler-Chelpin and Arthur Harden received the Nobel Prize in chemistry for research on alcoholic fermentation of carbohydrates and the role of enzymes. Arthur Harden dealt only with the chemical effects of bacteria from 1903 with alcoholic fermentation. Harden discovered that the enzyme zymase, discovered by Eduard Buchner, only produces fermentation in interaction with the coenzyme cozymase. Euler-Chelpin, in turn, convincingly described what happens in sugar fermentation and the action of fermentation enzymes using physical chemistry. This explanation led to the understanding of the important processes taking place in the muscles for the supply of energy.
