= Lennart von Post =

Ernst Jakob Lennart von Post
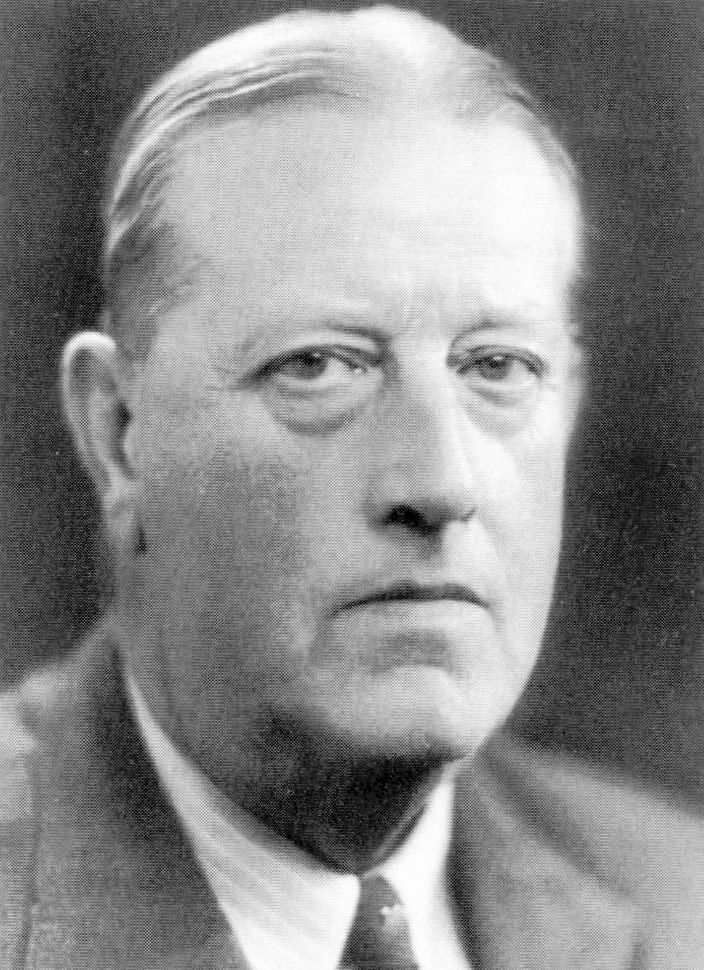
- Lennart von Post
- Born: 16 June 1884; Johannesberg, Västmanland County, Sweden
- Died: 11 January 1951 (aged 66); Engelbrekt Parish, Stockholm County, Sweden
- Education: Uppsala University
- Known for: Palynology, Quaternary geology
- Awards: Vega Medal (1944)
- Scientific career
- Fields: Geology, Botany, Palynology
- Workplaces: Swedish Geological Survey, Stockholms Högskola

Ernst Jakob Lennart von Post (16 June 1884 – 11 January 1951) was a Swedish naturalist and geologist. He was the first to publish quantitative analysis of pollen and is counted as one of the founders of palynology. He was a professor at Stockholm University 1929–1950.

== Early life ==
Lennart von Post was born in Johannesberg, near Västerås in Västmanland County, Sweden. He was the son of Carl-Fabian Axel von Post (1849–1927) and Beata Jacqueline Charlotta Christina (1852–1885). Von Post was an only child. His father served in the Swedish Army as a judge-advocate but also worked as a civilian lawyer, farmer and assistant cantonal judge.

== Education ==
Von Post studied geology at Uppsala University from 1902 to 1907, eventually obtaining his licentiat degree. At Uppsala he learned from lecturers such as A.G. Högbom, who developed the concept of the geochemical carbon cycle and Rutger Sernander, of the Blytt-Sernander Pleistocene sequence. Von Post began working on a history of the development of the Mästermyr marsh on Gotland with Jakob Ljungqvist in 1902. This was likely the first research project von Post was involved with, however his first publications appeared in 1903, describing the Littorina wall. This paper was important since it described, along with another paper by Kjellmark, layers of Littorina shells in beach exposures leading to estimates of isostatic rebound and post glacial transgression in Sweden.

== Scientific career ==
Von Post worked for the Swedish Geological Survey for 21 years as a peat specialist. During this time he developed the technique of using pollen grains to build stratigraphies that could be used to correlate peat layers locally. By 1916, along with work by (Gustav?) Lagerheim for N.O. Holst, the concept of using pollen to describe immigration of plant species and changes in the relative numbers of plants took hold. This work led to the publication of the first modern pollen diagram in 1916, the same year that von Post presented his now famous lecture in Christiania, although the two pertained to different subject matter.

His work was seminal in beginning the field of palynology however von Post rarely published in a language other than Swedish meaning his work did not reach the wide audience that others, including Gunnar Erdtman, did. Regardless, von Post was highly influential, working with palynologists including Gunnar Erdtman, Knut Fægri and others. It is notable however that conflict between Erdtman and von Post led to Erdtman's relative obscurity in academia for a number of years.

Von Post discovered by accident a small canyon near Degerfors in 1923 which he then held was the elusive outlet of the Ancylus Lake. His idea received support and led to a collaboration with Henrik Munthe, a colleague from the Geological Survey of Sweden. However they fell into personal disputes and collaboration ended in 1927. Von Post's proposed outlet, named Svea River, was never fully accepted with alternative theories for the origin of the canyon being proposed. Notably Astrid Cleve-Euler proposed in 1946 the canyon was formed by subglacial drainage of a lake. The existence of Svea River was fully discarded in 1981 when potholes in it were found to contain sediments that predate the Ancylus Lake.

At the time of his death in 1951 von Post was preparing a large study on Klarälven which was left unfinished.

== Awards and recognition ==
- 1906 – Linnaeus Prize
- 1927 – Honorary Doctorate: Stockholms Högskola
- 1939 – nominated as a member of the Royal Swedish Academy of Sciences
- 1941 – Honorary Doctorate: University of Königsberg
- 1950 – Honorary Doctorate: University of Copenhagen
