= Dagmar Cronstedt =

Swedish countess

Dagmar Carola Adelaide Cronstedt (5 October, 1919–5 December, 2006) was a Swedish countess who during the Second World War worked at Radio Königsberg, broadcasting German propaganda to neutral Sweden. She mainly did a talk show together with Brita Bager, focusing on current news events.

She married the Nobel Prize winner physiologist and pharmacologist Ulf von Euler in 1958.
