= Henrik Munthe =

Swedish geologist

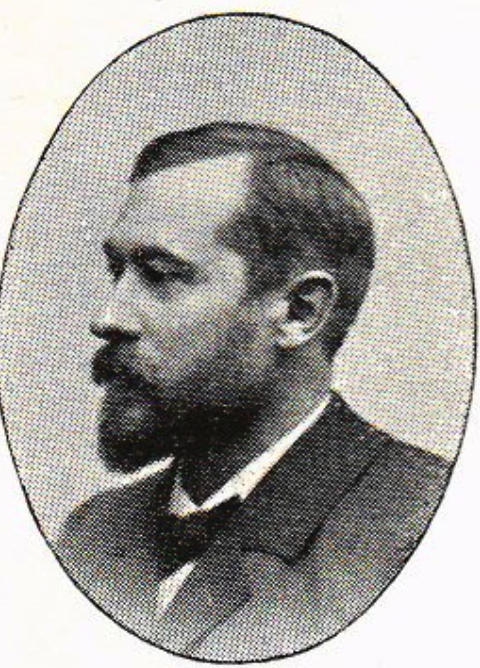
- Born: 1 November 1860; När parish, Gotland County, Sweden
- Died: 15 August 1958 (aged 97); Oscar Parish, Stockholm County, Sweden
- Citizenship: Sweden
- Education: Uppsala University
- Known for: Ancylus Lake; Geology of Gotland
- Awards: Björkénska priset (1913)
- Scientific career
- Fields: Quaternary geology
- Workplaces: Uppsala University; Geological Survey of Sweden

Henrik Vilhelm Munthe (1 November 1860 – 15 August 1958) was a Swedish geologist.

== Biography ==
Munthe became a student in 1882 and in 1892 a doctor of philosophy and associate professor of geology at Uppsala University, where he was acting professor of mineralogy and geology in 1894–96. In 1898 he was appointed and in 1899 regular geologist at the Swedish Geological Survey (SGU). In the years 1904-13 he was secretary of the Geological Society in Stockholm. Munthe received the title of professor in 1917. He was elected to the Royal Swedish Academy of Sciences in 1928.

His research centered on the Quaternary geology of the Baltic Sea region, nevertheless he did also some contributions on the Silurian stratigraphy of Västergötland and Gotland. Having begun his career using bicycles to survey the terrain Munthe continued to advocate using bicycle well after survey by car had become commonplace.

A Gotlänning ("Gotlander") by birth Munthe's dialect is reported to have been Gotländska and he was particularly fond of working with issues regarding the island. He was the editor of SGU's Gotland maps and lectured about its Quaternary geology at the Visby local history society in 1911. Munthe was an active member of Geologiska föreningen i Stockholm being a longtime editor of its scientific journal Geologiska föreningens förhandlingar (now GFF). He was also a member of the Swedish Society for Nature Conservation and Svenska Turistföreningen.

== Scientific career ==
Following his 1886 discovery of Ancylus fluviatilis fossils in Gotland Munthe proposed in 1887 the existence of the Ancylus Lake, a lake that would prove "the most enigmatic (and discussed) of the many Baltic stages".

Later he endorsed the idea of an outlet for this lake at the near Degerfors (Svea River) proposed by Lennart von Post in the 1920s. The two worked together until 1927 when their relation fell apart. In 1927 and 1928 he was involved in a controversyabout Svea River through opinion pieces in newspapers with Astrid Cleve, a strident outcast of Sweden's geological community.
