= Radio Königsberg =

Coordinates: 54°43′10.35″N 20°29′51.93″E

Radio Königsberg was a radio program broadcast by the Reichs-Rundfunk-Gesellschaft, which transmitted news related to Nazi Germany during World War II. It transmitted in Swedish; the purpose was to gain Swedish support for Germany but most of all for Adolf Hitler, his Nazi Party and the ideology of Nazism.

Radio Königsberg was originally produced at the Haus des Rundfunks in Berlin, but moved to East Prussian Königsberg (present-day Kaliningrad) when the Allies started to bomb Berlin. When the Red Army approached, it moved to occupied Oslo and transmitted from there until World War II ended.

The program reached a considerable popularity with about 10% of the Swedish population reported as being regular listeners. Among the people involved in Radio Königsberg were: Dagmar Kronstedt, Thorolf Hillblad, Elin Svensson, Anna-Lisa Gerloff and Gösta Richter.

== See also ==
- Heilsberg transmitter
- Nazi propaganda
