= Geologiska föreningen =

Swedish scientific learned society

Geologiska föreningen is a scientific learned society founded in Sweden in 1871. The society was formerly known as Geologiska föreningen i Stockholm.

== Publications ==
GFF
- Discipline: Geology; Paleontology
- Language: English

Publication details
- Former names: Geologiska Föreningens Förhandlingar; Geologiska Föreningen i Stockholm Förhandlingar
- History: 1872–present
- Publisher: Geologiska föreningen
- Frequency: Quarterly

Standard abbreviations
- ISO 4: GFF

Indexing
- GFF
- ISSN: 1103-5897 (print); 2000-0863 (web)
- Geologiska Föreningen i Stockholm Förhandlingar
- ISSN: 0016-786X

Links
- Journal homepage

The society publishes GFF (formerly Geologiska Föreningen i Stockholm Förhandlingar), a peer-reviewed academic journal which focused on the geology, paleontology, and petrology of Baltoscandia and Northern Europe in general. It also published the quarterly magazine Geologisk Forum.
