= Mastogloia Sea =

Stage in evolution of the Baltic Sea

The Mastogloia Sea (also Early Littorina Sea, Initial Littorina Sea) is one of the prehistoric stages of the Baltic Sea in its development after the last ice age. It is characterised by distinctive deposits of the calciferous shell of species of the diatom Mastogloia that were used for paleoenvironmental reconstructions. This transition took place at different times in different parts of the Baltic basin c. 9000 years ago following the Ancylus Lake stage and preceding the full Littorina Sea stage. (Note: Dates used in this article are calibrated radiocarbon dating years before present (meaning, technically before the year 1950 AD, using OxCal program (Version 4.3), if a terrestrial sample against the IntCal13 calibration curve and if marine sample against the Marine 13 calibration curve.)

== Overview ==
The earliest sea water transgressions at Blekinge in southeastern Sweden were at the Mastogloia Sea stage.

Towards its demise, the Ancylus Lake was falling, having partly eroded and scouring away at its new outlet at the Great Belt. It reached sea level c. 9800 years ago, making it the Mastogloia Sea.

At this time global sea level was rising rapidly due to the melting of vast tracts of the great ice age ice sheets. As a result, some sea (salt) water started to penetrate into the basin through the Danish Straits, mixing into the vast freshwater body. This led to the stage's slightly brackish conditions in the Baltic.

This phase of the body of water takes its name from the brackish water-dwelling diatom genus Mastogloia, the species of which are characteristic of the geological deposits of this stage. (Note: The genus Mastogloia also has fresh water species. This article does not go into the now better understood genetics, metabolism and ecology of these microalgae which was poorly understood when the significance of a signal from their distinctive silica shells was. See the article diatom for such detail. Essentially diatom blooms are associated with sudden nutrient enrichment which was provided by the salt water from the world sea and disruption of stratification and anoxic conditions in the fresh water lakes. There are other diatoms in deposits than Mastogloia that have contributed to the understanding of what happened in the Baltic basin so using this name for the sea stage could cause misunderstanding.) As fresh water lakes became part of the sea identification in the now marine deposits of Mastogloia smithii allow dating which is between 9.8 and 8.5 ka cal. BP. Periods of high salinity were associated with even more distinct deposits.

Continuing sea level rise during this stage deepened the straits connecting the body with the ocean, thus increasing the influx of salt water.

A great hydrographic shift occurred c. 9850 years ago, which corresponds to shifts in currents in the Skagerrak, Kattegat and the Norwegian Channel, as they transition to the modern circulation system in the eastern North Sea. This is a consequence of the opening, and deepening, of Strait of Dover and the Danish straits and increased Atlantic water inflow. Thereafter this caused the South Jutland Current. Between 9850 and 8550 years ago the body of water became brackish, starting from the southern parts closest to the ocean and spreading to its centre and finally the shallow, ice-prone, well-watered Gulf of Finland and Gulf of Bothnia.

The overwhelming by brackish water happened at different times at different places in the Baltic basin. As well as the Ancylus Lake there were isolated lake basins. Baltic relative sea levels were different when these events happened with factors such at land rebound and the level of the world ocean being important. Relative sea level data points show negative tendencies in the northern Baltic region and positive ones in the southern region. The initial event in the south western portion of the Baltic Basin at about 9.8 ka cal. BP was at 23 to 22 m (75 to 72 ft) below present sea level. About 9.5 to 9.1 ka cal. BP, the relative sea level at Lomtjärn in Ångermanland, northern Sweden was around 180 m (590 ft). More recently than this at 8.9 ka cal. BP the Usedom/Rügen islands region of Germany, was inundated by sea water when 16 m (52 ft) below sea level. The stable and low relative sea levels found in Haväng and Pärnu in the eastern Baltic suggest that sea-level rise in the world's oceans was not the only factor in the time of inundation by a connection to the world ocean.

== Ecology ==
The marine microfossil record in today's deepest part of the Baltic Sea shows before 7.1 ka cal. BP, the freshwater surface diatoms Aulacoseira islandica and Stephanodiscus neoastraea and other evidence of a low productivity ecosystem, with transient greater productivity in response to brackish conditions.

== Successor ==
The phase of more saline conditions and higher sea level than today marks the Littorina Sea stage. In the Baltic Basin the Early Holocene rapid sea-level rise, well known from more southern European North Sea coasts was only after 8.5 ka cal. BP.

The Mastogloia Sea stage thus is between the freshwater Ancylus Lake stage and the Littorina Sea stage.

== Disputed status ==
Many researchers have been unwilling to recognize the Mastogloia Sea as a separate stage in the development of the Baltic Sea, favouring including it in either the Ancylus Lake stage or the Littorina Sea stage.

In stratigraphy of Baltic sediments the Mastogloia stage is difficult to detect, its sediments being visibly identical to those of the Ancylus Lake. Even the fossil diatom content of the phase's sediments – cited by researchers as the key method of distinguishing deposits of different Baltic stages – is ambiguous, in many places showing no difference from that of Ancylus deposits, and at best including an admixture of Mastogloia diatoms in an otherwise typical Ancylus flora. Deposits of the Littorina Sea phase show a drastic change both in the visible characteristics of the sediment and its diatoms. Some academics prefer to include the phase as the early Littorina Sea stage, being the time after resumption of a marine (sea) connection.

In spite of these objections, though, the concept of the phase persists in literature concerning the development of the Baltic Sea. It has been noted that it is useful in maintaining the clarity of the system, delimiting the period with undeniable if slight marine influence following the fall of the Ancylus Lake to sea level that pre-dates the great changes from the outset of the Littorina Sea stage. The concept is now generally adopted, admittedly under the name initial Littorina Sea stage.
