= Ancylus Lake =

Predecessor to the Baltic Sea

Ancylus Lake. The shrunken Scandinavian ice-cap is shown in white. "Svea älv" was a strait within the lake while Göta älv formed an outlet to the Atlantic Sea. (Note: Before 2021 a full corrected calibrated database for Holocene events in the Baltic Basin did not exist. The corrections to some historical dates and redefinition for the Ancylus Lake events, resulted in changes back in time that were up to about 1,800 years.)

Ancylus Lake is a name given by geologists to a large freshwater lake that existed in northern Europe approximately from 8,750 to 7,850 years BC, being in effect one of various predecessors to the modern Baltic Sea.

== Origin, evolution and demise ==
The Ancylus Lake replaced the Yoldia Sea after the latter had been severed from its saline intake across a seaway along the Central Swedish lowland, roughly between Gothenburg and Stockholm. The cutoff was the result of isostatic rise being faster than the concurrent post-glacial sea level rise.

In the words of Svante Björck the Ancylus Lake "is perhaps the most enigmatic (and discussed) of the many Baltic stages". The lake's outlet and elevation relative to sea level were for long time surrounded by controversy. It is now known that the lake was above sea level, included Lake Vänern, and drained westward through three outlets at Göta Älv, Uddevalla and Otteid. As result of the continued isostatic uplift of Sweden, the outlets in central Sweden were severed. In turn this resulted in the lake tipping over a till substrate at what is now the Great Belt in Denmark. Being located no less than 10 m (33 ft) above sea level the lake began thus to drain to the sea through the Dana River between 10,200 years and 9,800 years BP. The formation of the Dana River is thought to have caused a dramatic erosion of sediments, peatlands and forests along its path. This led initially to a relatively rapid fall in the lake level over hundreds of years, which then continued at a slower pace. Another consequence of the lowering of the lake and isostatic uplift was that a north–south land bridge formed between Lake Vänern and the Ancylus Lake, effectively making Lake Vänern a separate basin.

The Ancylus Lake existed from approximately 10,700 to 9,800 years BP, during the Boreal period. The lake became the Littorina Sea when rising sea levels broke through the Dana River forming the Great Belt. This transformation was gradual as salt-water had begun to enter the Ancylus Lake at 9,800 years BP. The salt-water that entered the lake resulted in episodic brackish water pulses, and this phase has now been reclassified as the Early Littorina Sea (also known as Initial Littorina Sea) which was followed by a stage called the Mastogloia Sea by some. The final definite Littorina Sea, had a stage with high salinity between 7,100 and 5,400 years BP when flooding through Øresund was such that there was an inflow of salt-water from the world ocean.

Shorelines of Ancylus Lake can be found today at about 60 m (200 ft) above sea level in southern Finland and at about 200 m (660 ft) near the northern Gulf of Bothnia.

== Research history ==
=== Discovery ===
In 1887 Henrik Munthe was the first geologist to draw the conclusion that the Baltic Sea must once have been a freshwater lake. Munthe did so after finding fossils of the freshwater snail Ancylus fluviatilis in sediments. While these fossils were also found slightly before him by other geologists they thought they belonged to rivers, small former lakes or brackish water, failing thus to realize the existence of the lake. Geologists had until then subscribed to a simple scheme for the evolution of the Baltic Sea where small local ice-lakes were succeeded by the Yoldia Sea that then evolved directly to the Littorina Sea. The lake was named by Gerard De Geer in 1890 after the fossils.

=== Controversy ===
The lack of an obvious outlet of the lake led to intermittent debates involving not only Munthe and De Geer but also Ernst Antevs, Arvid Högbom, Axel Gavelin, N.O. Holst and H. Hedström. As the outlet was lacking there were doubts on whether Lake Vänern had been part of the lake or not, and on the position of its outlet or whether an outlet actually existed considering the lake could have been at sea level.

Lennart von Post discovered by accident a small canyon near Degerfors in 1923 which he thought could be the elusive outlet. This came with time to be known as Svea River. Von Post collaborated initially with Munthe to study Svea River but their collaboration fell apart by 1927 over personal issues. The idea that the Svea River canyon was the outlet of the Ancylus Lake gradually lost ground by the works of Sten Florin, Astrid Cleve and Curt Fredén. In 1927 Cleve who was already "an outcast of the geological community" commented in an opinion piece in Svenska Dagbladet on a proposal of making Svea River a national monument. She supported the idea of protecting the area but criticized the established interpretation of Munthe and von Post. Munthe replied in Dagens Nyheter and the debate went over to a personal quarrel in two more newspaper letters in January 1928. Cleve outlined her ideas for Svea River and Ancylus Lake in detail in 1930 making an alternative and intricate theory involving tectonic movements. By 1946 she had proposed a different theory. She hypothesized that the Svea River canyons and potholes formed by subglacial drainage and had nothing to do with the Ancylus Lake. Svea River was finally dismissed in 1981 when potholes there were found to predate the lake.

The demise of Svea River led authors in the late 1970s and 1980s to revisit the idea that the fresh-water Ancylus Lake was at sea level. Further studies confirmed then that Vänern was part of the lake and that it was above sea level, dismissing the idea of a sea-level lake a second time.
