= Littorina Sea =

Stage in evolution of the Baltic Sea

Littorina Sea around 7000 years BP.

Littorina Sea (also Litorina Sea) is a geological brackish water stage of the Baltic Sea, which existed around 8500–4000 BP and followed the Mastogloia Sea (initial Littorina Sea), a transitional stage from the Ancylus Lake.

This stage and form of the body of water is named after common periwinkle (Littorina littorea), then a prevailing mollusc in the waters, which indicates its salinity.

Graph the multiple changes in relative sea level at Blekinge in southeastern Sweden since the initial Littorina Sea stage

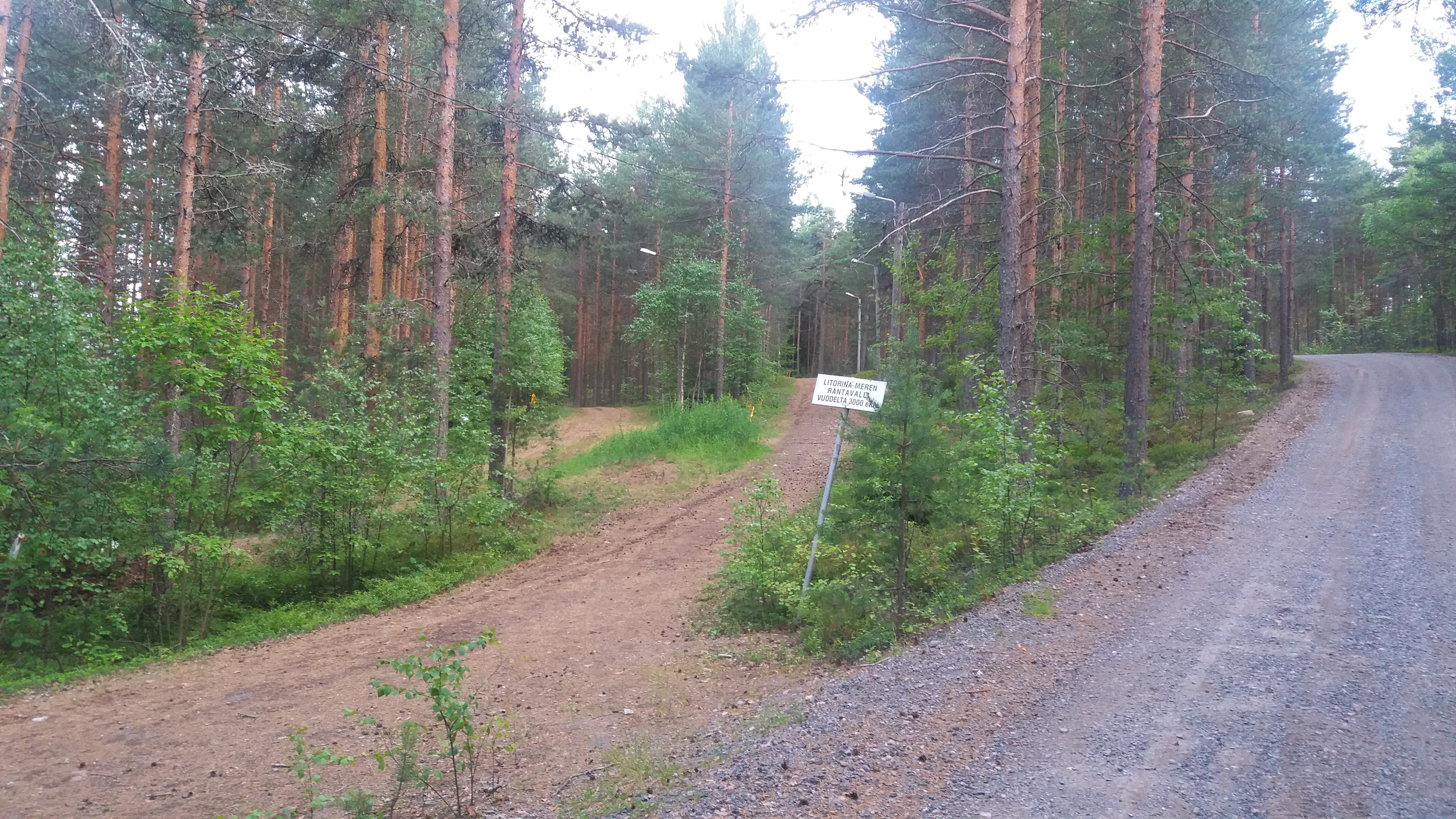
Example of a Littorina Sea high stand terrace in Finland

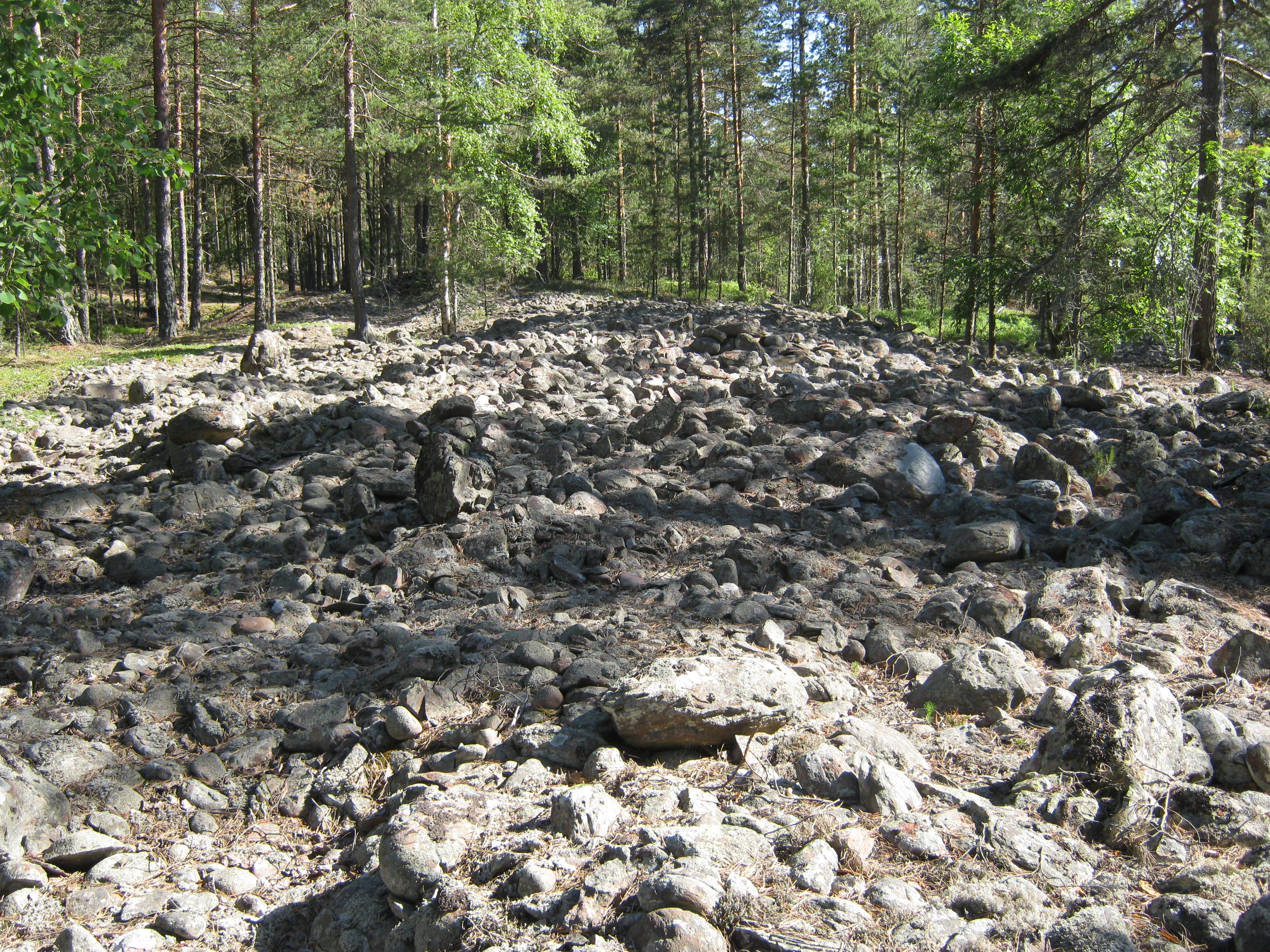
Boulder field in Finland created during Littorina Sea existence

== Overview ==
The last fully fresh water stage in the Baltic basin, the Ancylus Lake ended at 9,800 ka cal. BP when salt water from the world ocean started entering the Mastogloia Sea in the Great Belt region commencing an initial Littorina Sea which as a saline or brackish sea continues to this day.

These initial transgressions were incomplete and occurred at different times in different areas of the Baltic basin lasting until 8.5 ka cal. BP. The transition timings from fresh to brackish water that mark the onset of the Littorina Sea are not yet clearly defined. They may have been in the northern Great Belt region around 9.0 ka cal. BP and east of the Darβ Sill which is at the western end of the Baltic Sea, at sites so far studied, are after 8.5 ka cal. BP and this is the definite onset of the Littorina Sea.

Between 8 and 6 ka cal. BP the mid-Holocene relative sea level rise has been studied in more detail than later changes in water level in the Littorina Sea. The Holocene climatic optimum is now defined as about 8 to 4.8 cal. ka BP and resulted in northern Europe in a period of warm, and dry climate.

The Ångermanland region of northern Sweden had the highest post-glacial rebound in northern Europe, so between 9.1 and 7.8 ka cal. BP relative sea level dropped here from 152 to 128 m (499 to 420 ft) above sea level. Transitional regions in the eastern Baltic show positive relative sea level tendencies until between 7.5 and about 7.1 ka cal BP, when they become negative. The final melting of the Laurentide ice sheet followed by much lower rate of global sea-level rise took place at this general time, between 8 and 7 ka cal. BP. The southern and western Baltic basin has a negative trend in relative sea level throughout the Holocene. So it is known that near the Denmark straits this area was 20 m (66 ft) below sea level around 8.5 to 8.0 ka cal. BP, but the area around the Usedom/Rügen islands had up to 5 m (16 ft) higher relative sea level at the same time. There is only a good fit in timing of relative sea levels with global ice history studies in this later negative relative sea level group, meaning that the calculated contribution of ice loading in the global ice models is likely wrong for the eastern Baltic region.

A transgression of the Baltic widened its ocean link, allowing it to reach a peak of salinity during the warmer Atlantic period of European climatology. At this peak, the sea bore twice the volume of water and covered 26.5% more land than it does today. Diatom studies of the sediments of the Landsort Deep off Sweden suggest that the highest surface water salinities occurred between 7.1 and 5.4 ka BP, about the time of the Littorina Sea high stand. The halocline developed causing a stratified water column, due to the inflow of North Sea water into the deep waters of the Baltic basin.

The transition about 4 ka cal. BP to today's Baltic Sea, which could also be called the late Littorina Sea is ill defined. After the Holocene climatic optimum, land uplift exceeded world ocean sea level rise, and the resulting shallowing of the sills in the Baltic basin resulted in a gradual decrease in salinity. Some have it complete by 3.0 cal ka BP and it is characterised by microfossil changes from those of a typical high salt marine environment. As the period ended, the features of the modern coast appeared, including lagoons, spits, and dunes. Notable exceptions include steep terraces such as the Øresund where the recession of sea level exposes less dry land.

== Ecology ==
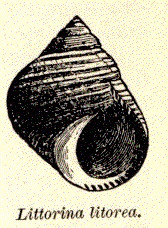
Common periwinkle shells are found in deposits from the Littorina Sea

As revealed in the marine microfossil record in today's deepest part of the Baltic Sea, which includes freshwater surface diatoms Aulacoseira islandica and Stephanodiscus neoastraea, before 7.1 ka cal. BP the water ecosystem had low productivity as inherited from the Ancylus Lake stage but there is evidence of transient greater productivity in response to brackish conditions. This includes by 7.2 ka cal. BP the presence of Chaetoceros resting spores. At 7.4 ka cal. BP the brackish surface layers allowed for the first time Cyclotella radiosa and Pantocsekiella comensis.

There was a period of high marine productivity associated with the high saline, hypoxic bottom period. in the period 5.4–2.4 ka cal. This period had organisms in the fossil record not found in today's Baltic. These include Pseudosolenia calcar-avis which is presently found in tropical and subtropical seas, Thalassionema nitzschioides which no longer occurs in the Baltic north of the Bornholm Basin, Chaetoceros mitra no longer found in the Baltic but present in today's North Sea. Octactis speculum which definitely requires high salinity is only present between 6.8 and 5.4 ka cal. BP.

As brackish conditions were re-established intermediate productivity ecosystems similar to the present day Baltic Sea were established. Chaetoceros resting spores are mostly abundant and Pseudosolenia calcar-avis is rare after 5.4 ka cal. BP. Chaetoceros mitra resting spores do not appear after about 4.7 ka cal.BP.

During the period, from the Ancylus Lake, temperate deciduous forest had crept north to cover the littoral hinterland and thus coastal regions of the sea. The deep sediment pollen record shows a relative increase in say pine tree pollen grains possibly due to less humid warm conditions in summer during the Holocene climatic optimum.
