= Boreal period =

First of Blytt–Sernander sequence of north European climatic phase

In paleoclimatology of the Holocene, the Boreal was the first of the Blytt–Sernander sequence of north European climatic phases that were originally based on the study of Danish peat bogs, named for Axel Blytt and Rutger Sernander, who first established the sequence. In peat bog sediments, the Boreal is also recognized by its characteristic pollen zone. It was preceded by the Younger Dryas, the last cold snap of the Pleistocene, and followed by the Atlantic, a warmer and moister period than our most recent climate. The Boreal, transitional between the two periods, varied a great deal, at times having within it climates like today's.

== Subdividing the Boreal ==
Subsequent to the original Blytt-Sernander scheme, the first stage of the Boreal was divided off as a Pre-boreal transitional phase, followed by the Boreal proper. Some current schemes based on pollen zones also distinguish a pre-Boreal (pollen zone IV), an early Boreal (pollen zone V) and a late Boreal (pollen zone VIa, b, and c).

== Dating ==
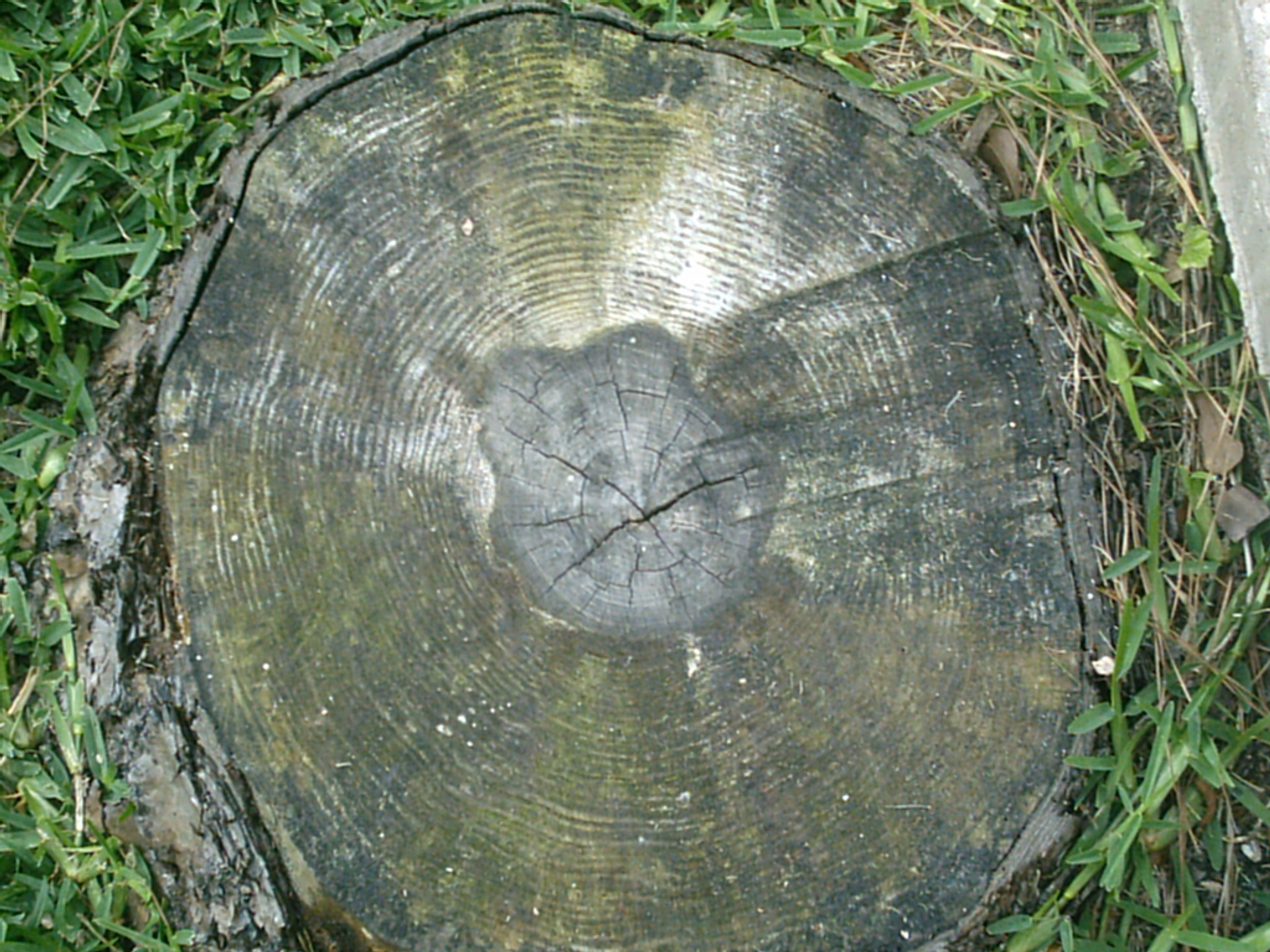
Pine tree rings

One commonly cited date for the end of the Younger Dryas and the start of the Pre-Boreal is 11,500 Before Present calibrated. The start of the period is relatively sharply defined by a rise of 7 °C in 50 years in South Greenland. The date is based fairly solidly on Greenland ice cores, which give 11,640 BP for the late Younger Dryas and 11,400 BP for the early Pre-Boreal.

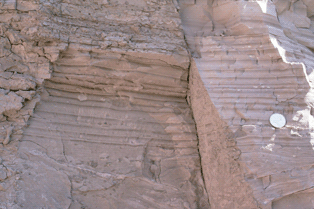
Varves

Estimates of other dates vary by up to 1000 years, for a number of reasons. First, "Boreal" can identify a paleoclimate, a pollen zone or a temporally-fixed chronozone, and those three bases of definition allow quite different dates. Second, different dating methods obtain different dates. The underlying problem is that climate and pollen vary somewhat from region to region. The scientists of each region use the methods available in their region, whether lake varves, the annual layers of sediment from ancient or modern lake bottoms, ice cores or counts of tree rings (dendrochronology).

Standardization has become of increasing concern to scientists everywhere. Dates from many methods continue to multiply as paleoclimatologists seek higher resolution. But it is unclear whether regional variation will allow high-resolution standardization.

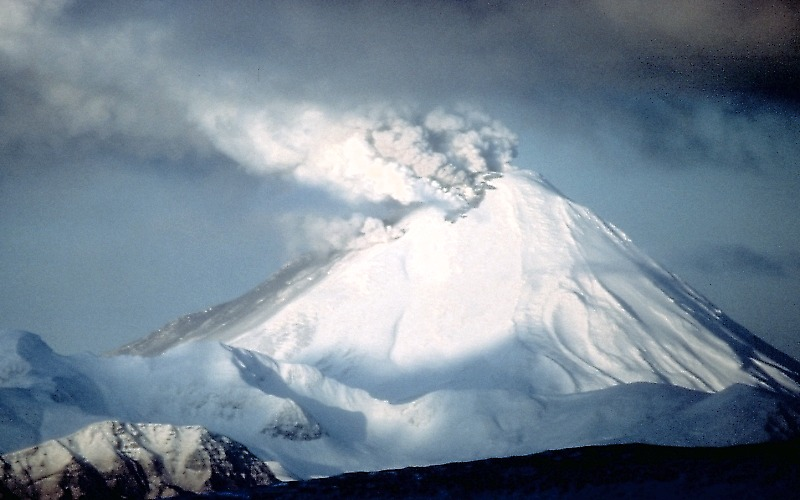
Distribution of tephra

Yet, there are some solid dates of the Pre-Boreal and Boreal. The Saksunarvatn tephra (an ash layer of volcanic fall-out) is dated in Greenland ice to 10,180±60 BP; in lake deposits at Krakenes in Norway, to 10,010–9,980 years BP calibrated; in northwest German lakes, to 10,090 BP calibrated. The tephra occurs in early Boreal contexts. So, it seems certain that the early Boreal (pollen zone V) includes the year 10,000 BP. Similarly, the late Boreal includes the Kilian/Vasset tephra of Swiss and southwest German lakes at 8200 BP, all calibrated. But the borders are less certain.

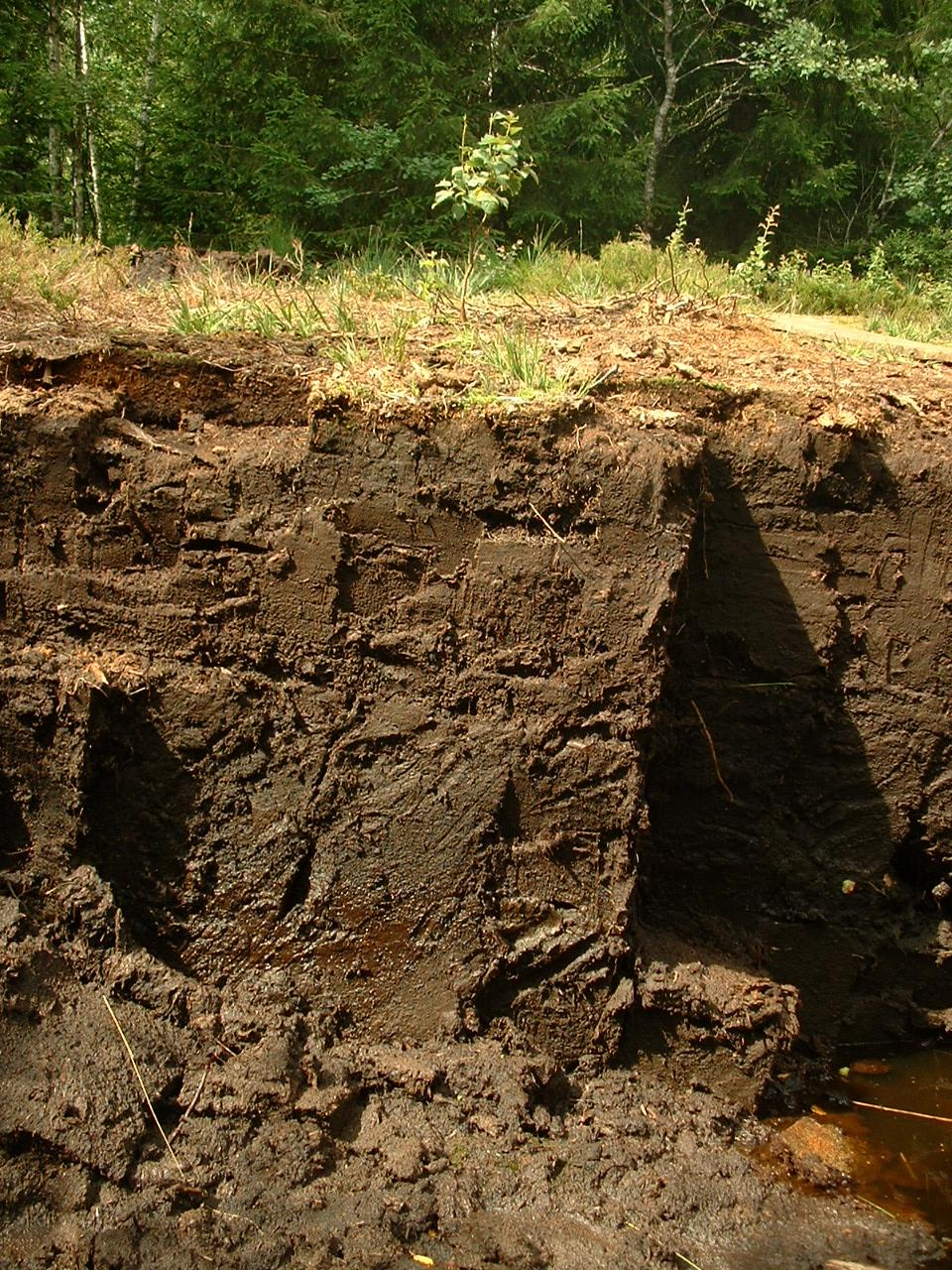
Peat

Studies of bogs in northwest Russia are the basis for a division of the PreBoreal (PB) into PB-1, 10,000–9800, and PB-2, 9800–9300 BP incal. The scheme goes on to divide the Boreal (BO) into BO-1, 9300–9000, BO-2, 9000–8500, and BO-3, 8500–8000, incal. CalPal used on these dates suggests overall boundaries of 11,500 and 10,500 BP for the Pre-Boreal, and the end of the Boreal at 8900.

Dates given recently are usually earlier than those given more than 10 years ago. For example, Iverson (1973) and Rud (1979) give dates of 10,000–9000 BP for the PreBoreal and 9000–8000 BP for the Boreal, which are uncalibrated C-14 dates based on Scandinavian pollen stratigraphy.

Presumably, more-recent dates are more accurate, as technology improves with time, often quite rapidly. Yet, pollen and climate phases also to some degree may depend on latitude, so no date can be regarded as certainly wrong. Scientists look for the overall pattern of the dates, but that technique is not 100% reliable, either.

== Description ==
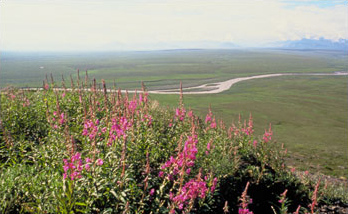
Tundra

Before the Pre-Boreal, Eurasia was locked in the chill of the Younger Dryas and was a mostly continuous tundra belt, with regions of taiga, covered with a blanket of grasses, shrubs and other low plants typical of open land. Large numbers of herbivores wandered in herds over vast distances. The blanket teemed with small, rapidly reproducing species, which supported food chains of larger predators. The largest predators and humans hunted the mammals of the open tundra.

The Pre-Boreal began with a sudden rise in temperature that abruptly changed this ecosystem. Forest replaced the open lands in Europe, and forest-dwelling animals spread from southern refugia and replaced the ice-age tundra mammals; new climax ecosystems developed. The old fauna persisted in Central Asia, but were soon hunted out, as they were not replenished by the larger areas formerly nourishing the ecosystem. The sea brought isolation by rising rapidly and many coastal areas becoming flooded and new islands formed. Forest had closed over the former European tundra.

Humans had to adapt to the encroaching forest or move east with the large mammals. Those who stayed became hunter-gatherers of the forests and fishers of the numerous bays, inlets and shallow waters around the thousands of islands that now spangled the seas of Europe. They lived richly and were encouraged to enter the pre-productive phase that we call the Mesolithic. Those who moved east hunted out the last of wild big game and turned their best efforts into learning to herd what was left. In the Americas, humans had left the Paleoindian phase and were now in the Archaic.

Meanwhile humanity toward the south of the north temperate zone had already turned to food production in a number of widely separated locations and were on the brink of civilization. There is no evidence of any extensive contact with the cultures of the north during the Boreal. The producers tended to live in dense centers without any interest in moving from there except when motivated to find new lands. The gatherers ranged widely over their lands, building only temporary settlements in which to spend the winter.

== Flora ==
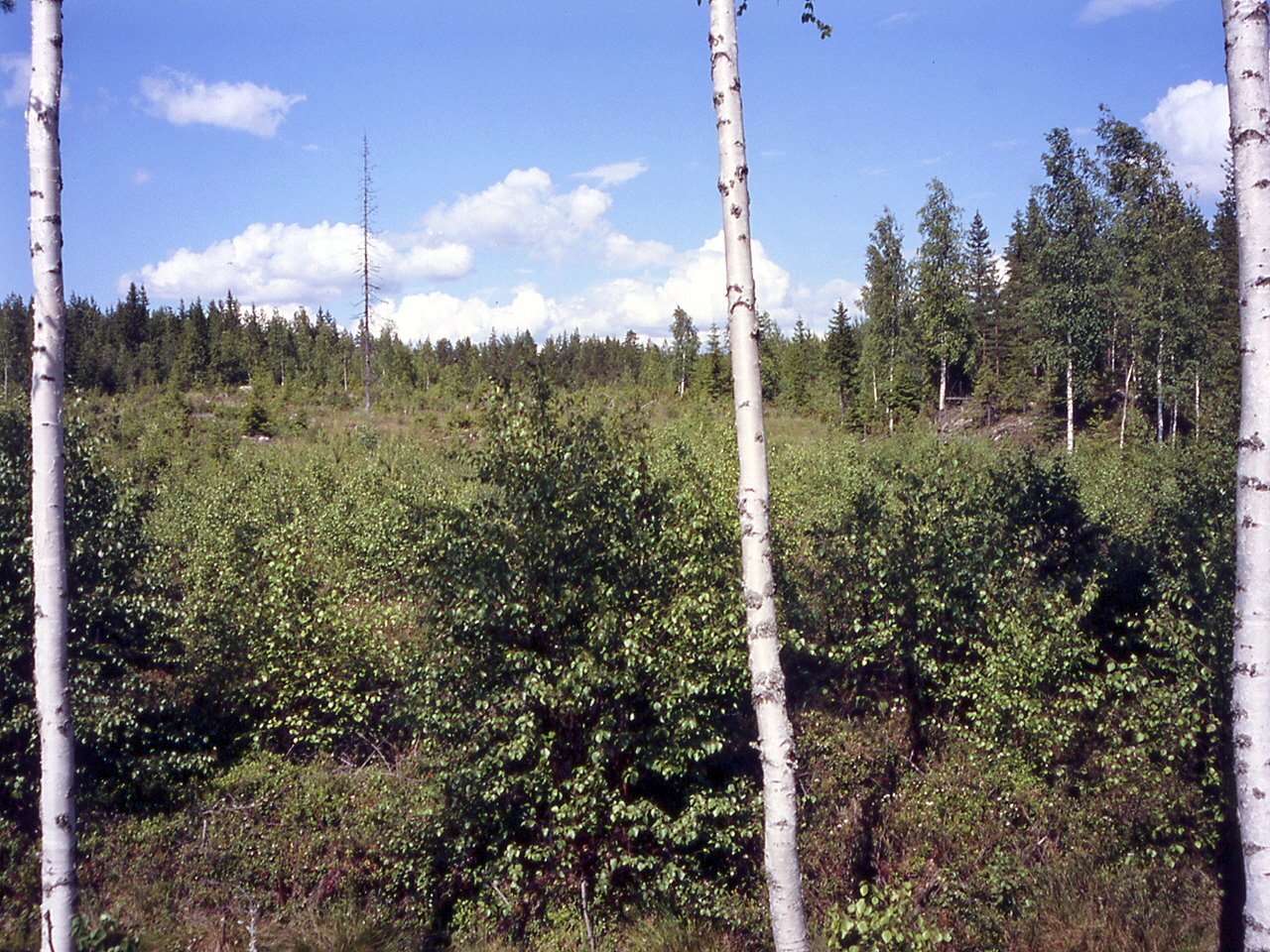
Birch forest near Ruovesi, Finland

During the Pre-Boreal pollen zone IV, large quantities of tree pollen began to replace the pollen of open-land species, as the most mobile and flexible arboreal species colonized their way northward, replacing the ice-age tundra plants. Foremost among them were the birches, Betula pubescens and Betula pendula, accompanied by Sorbus aucuparia and quaking aspen, Populus tremula. Especially sensitive to temperature changes and moving northward almost immediately were Juniperus nana and J. communis, the dwarf and shrub juniper respectively, which reached a maximum density in the Pre-Boreal, before their niches were shaded out. Pine soon followed, for which reason the resulting open woodland is often called a birch or a pine-birch forest.

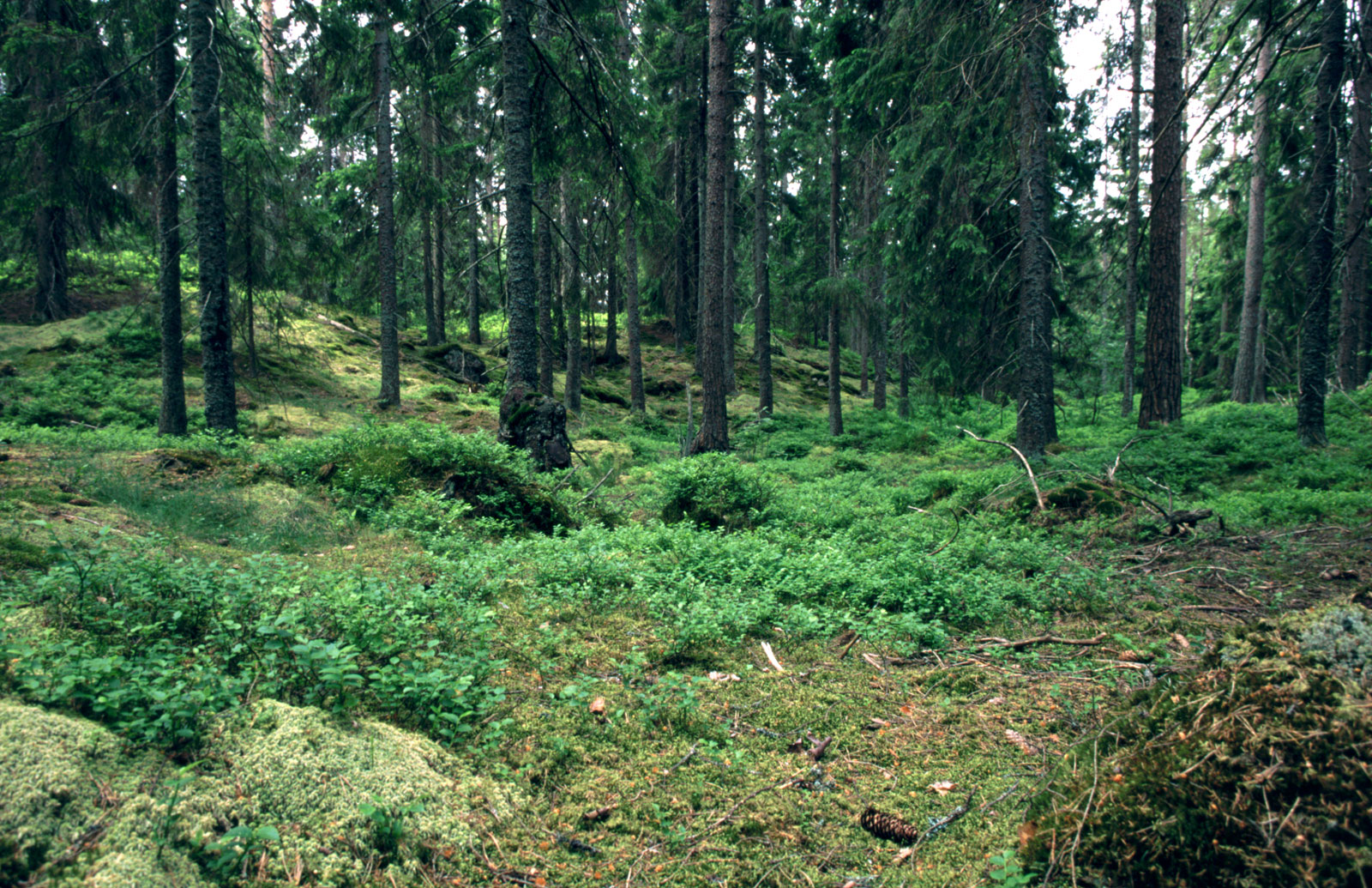
Swedish spruce forest

In the yet warmer early Boreal pollen zone V, Corylus avellana (hazel) and pine expanded into the birch woodlands to such a degree that palynologists refer to the resulting ecology as the hazel-pine forest. In the late Boreal it was supplanted by the spread of a deciduous forest called the mixed-oak forest. Pine, birch and hazel were reduced in favor of Quercus, Ulmus, Tilia and Alnus. The former tundra was now closed by a canopy of dense forest. In the marshland Typha latifolia prevailed. Less cold-tolerant species such as ivy and mistletoe were to be found in Denmark.

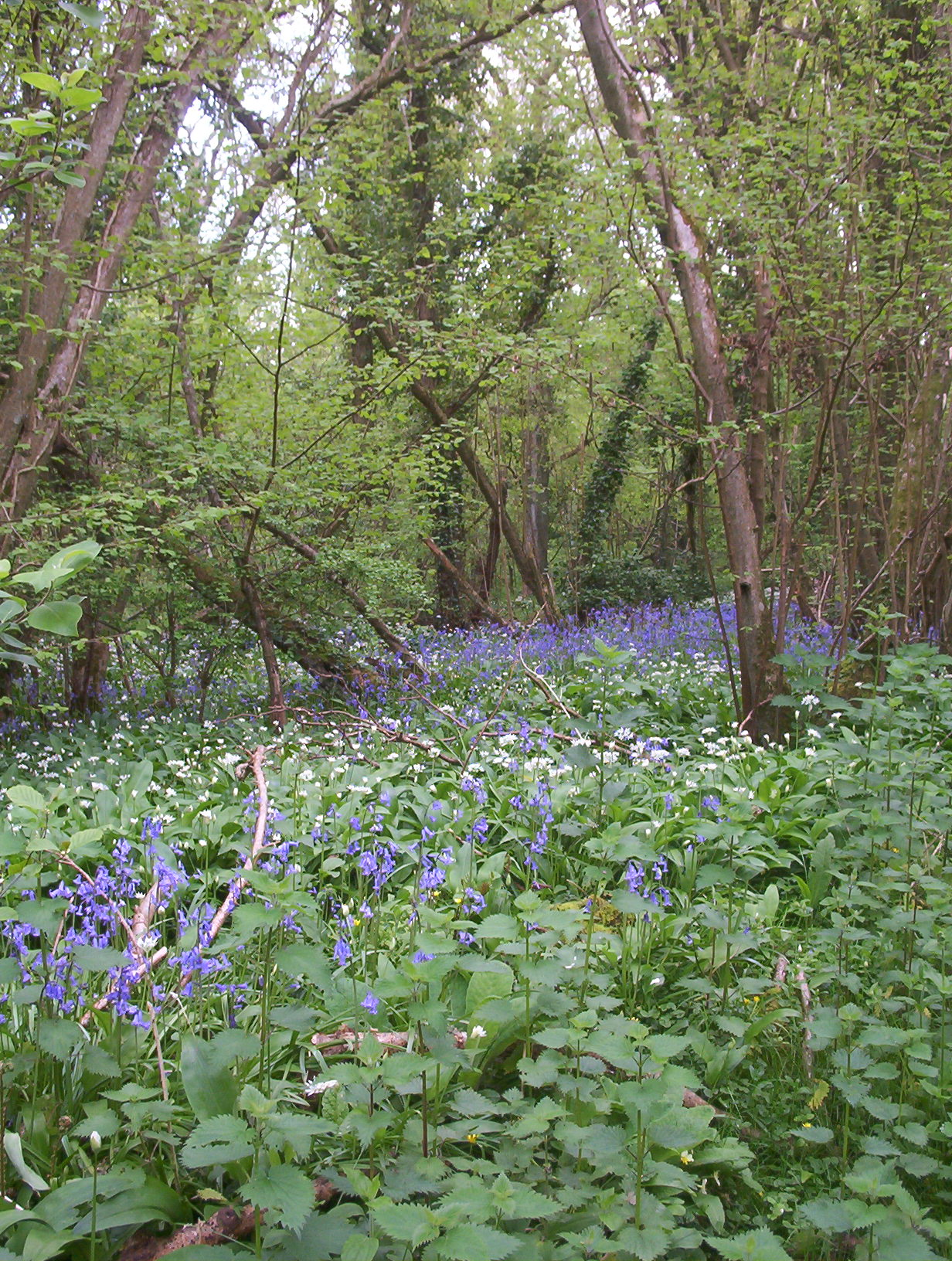
Corylus coppice

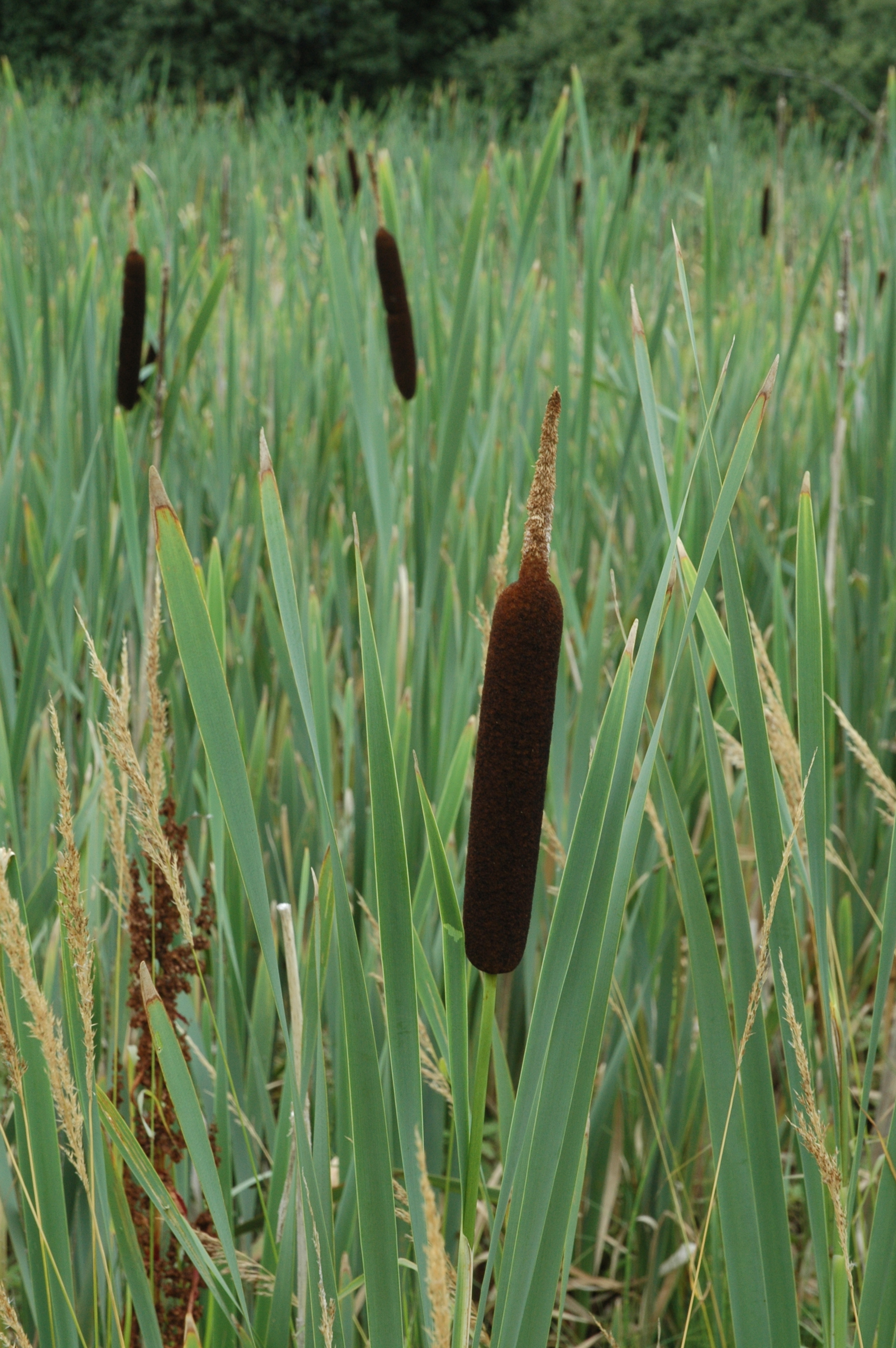
Typha latifolia

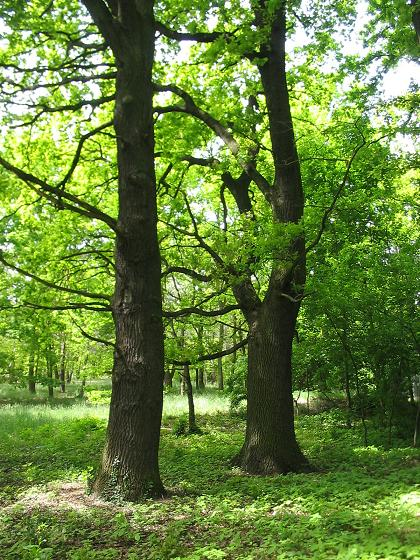
Oak forest

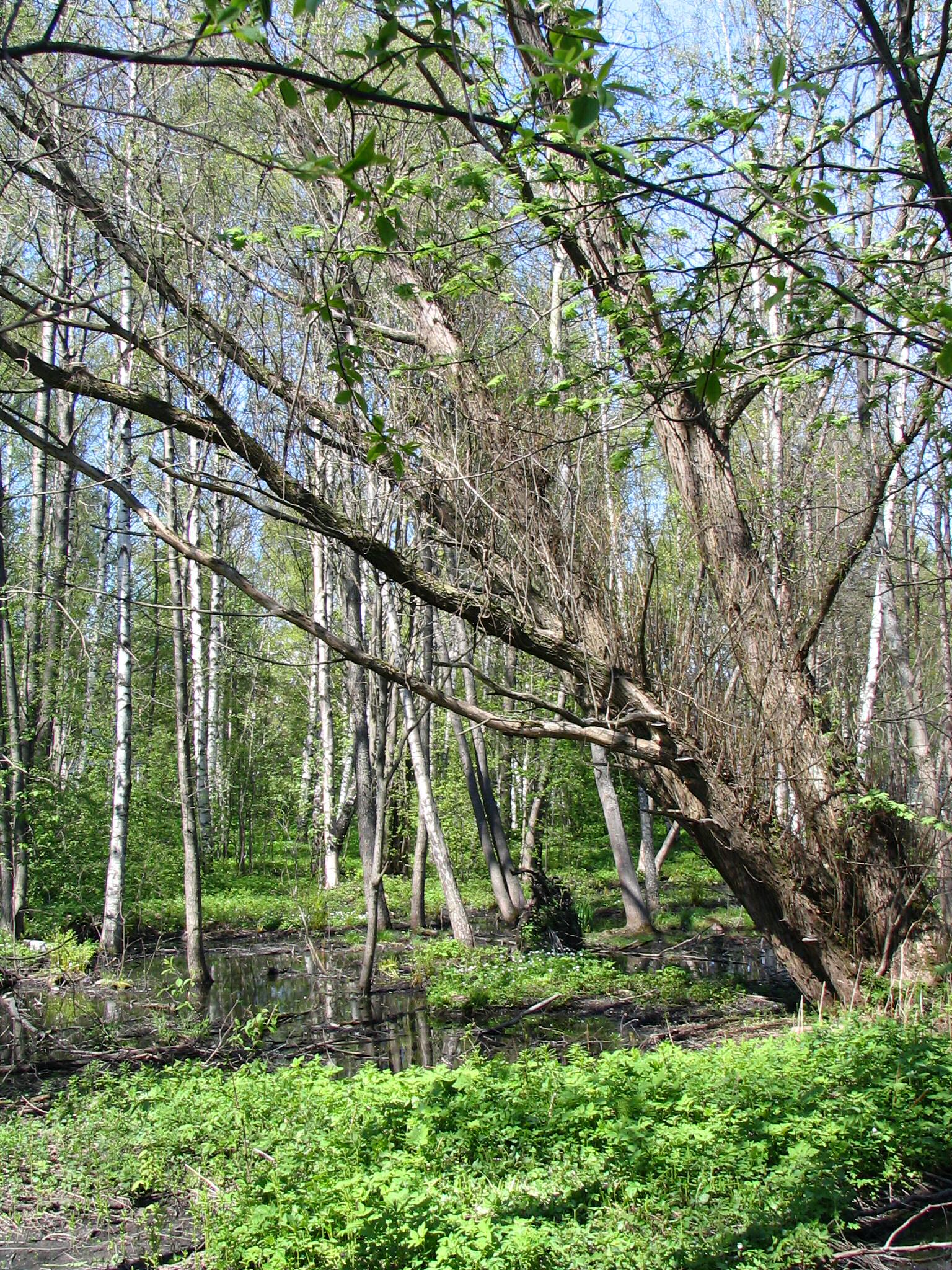
An alder forest at Strömsinlahti, Roihuvuori, Helsinki

== Fauna ==
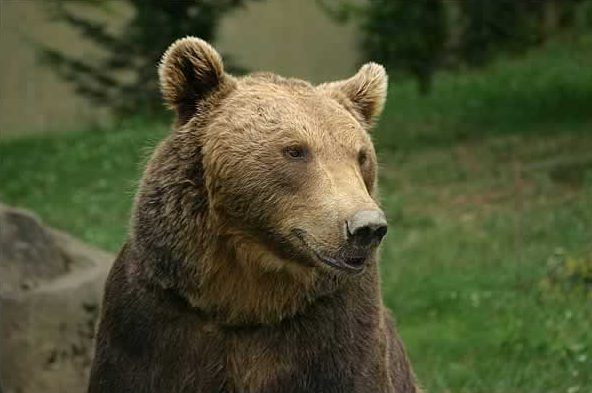
Brown bear of the Pyrenees

The new forest was populated with animals from refugia in Italy, Spain and the Balkans. Animals such as Emys orbicularis (European pond tortoise), which require warmer temperatures, were to be found in Denmark. The Eurasian golden plover came as far north as Norway.

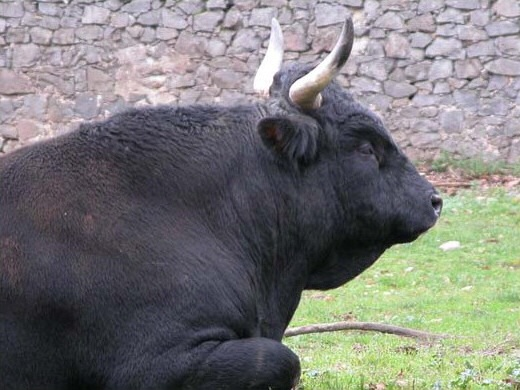
Reconstituted aurochs

Forest ungulates included: Cervidae Cervus elaphus (red deer), Capreolus capreolus (roe deer), Alces alces (elk), Sus scrofa (wild pig), and Bos primigenius (aurochs). Predators included: Canis lupus (wolf), Ursus arctos (brown bear), Lynx lynx (lynx), Felis sylvestris (wildcat), and herbivores Lepus europaeus (European hare).

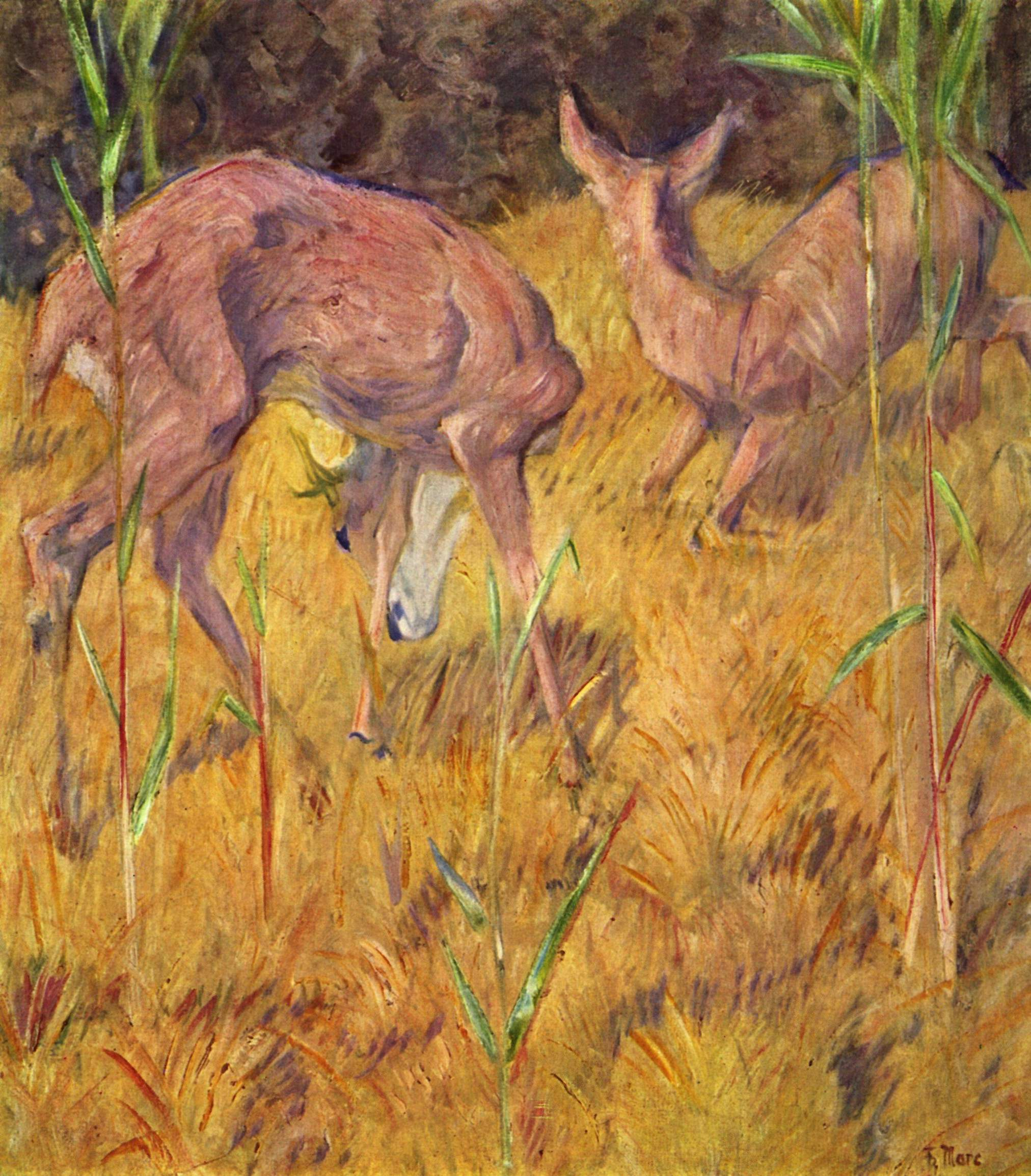
Deer in the Reeds, by Franz Marc

The inland waters would have contained mammal species such as Castor fiber (beaver), Lutra lutra (otter) and species of fish such as Esox lucius (northern pike) and Siluris glanis (catfish).

== Humans ==
The Preboreal-Boreal in Europe was a time of transition from the Palaeolithic cultures to the Mesolithic. Forests and drowned coastlands were places of plenty. Human settlements avoided the deep forest in favor of streams, lakes, and especially bays of the ocean.

Pre-Boreal settlements have been found in north-central Europe, such as at Friesack. There an unusual find of net fragments made from plant fibers suggested that fishing was an important part of life.

Finds from another settlement at Vis, near the Vychegda River in Russia, offer more details of life in a settlement of the Boreal. Plant fibers were used for baskets and for hafting bone points to shafts. Fishermen crossed the waters in bark boats plied by oars, and set nets. They also made hand-held nets from wooden hoops and plant fiber.

Food gathering continued in winter: skis and sledge runners have been found. Reindeer continued to be hunted. Bows, arrows, and spears have been found. Implements were likely to be embellished by sculpting in wood or bone. Only a few motifs were used: the elk's head, the snake, and human.

In Europe, the major culture was the Maglemosian (9000–6400 BC), extending into Denmark and Russia. Localized cultures included the Nieman of Lithuania, the Kunda of Latvia and Estonia, the Azilian of France, and the Epi-Gravettian of Italy. Towards the end of the Mesolithic, local traditions began to multiply, perhaps due to influences from the south, or due to the general advance of culture.

In North America the San Dieguito complex and Lake Mojave Complex existed in this period, located in Southern California's coastal region and Mojave Desert, and in northern Mexico's Sonoran Desert in the Yuma Desert and Baja California peninsula.

== See also ==
- Doggerland
- Paleo-Indians
