= 10th millennium BC =

Millennium between 10,000 BC and 9001 BC

The 10th millennium BC spanned the years 10,000 BC to 9001 BC (c. 12 ka to c. 11 ka). It marks the beginning of the transition from the Palaeolithic to the Neolithic via the interim Mesolithic (Northern Europe and Western Europe) and Epipaleolithic (Levant and Near East) periods, which together form the first part of the Holocene epoch that is generally believed to have begun c. 9700 BC (c. 11.7 ka) and is the current geological epoch. It is impossible to precisely date events that happened around the time of this millennium, and all dates mentioned here are estimates mostly based on geological analysis, anthropological analysis, and radiometric dating.

== Holocene epoch ==
The main characteristic of the Holocene has been the worldwide abundance of Homo sapiens sapiens (humankind). The epoch began in the wake of the Würm glaciation, generally known as the Last Ice Age, which began 109 ka and ended 14 ka, when Homo sapiens sapiens was in the Palaeolithic (Old Stone) Age. Following the Late Glacial Interstadial from 14 ka to 12.9 ka, during which global temperatures rose significantly, the Younger Dryas began. This was a temporary reversal of climatic warming to glacial conditions in the Northern Hemisphere and coincided with the end of the Upper Palaeolithic. The Younger Dryas ceased c. 9700 BC, marking the cutover from Pleistocene to Holocene.

In the geologic time scale, there are three (tentatively four) stratigraphic stages of the Holocene beginning c. 9700 BC with the "Greenlandian" (to c. 6236 BC). The starting point for the Greenlandian is the Global Boundary Stratotype Section and Point (GSSP) sample from the North Greenland Ice Core Project, which has been correlated with the Younger Dryas. The Greenlandian was succeeded by the "Northgrippian" (to c. 2250 BC) and the "Meghalayan". All three stages were officially ratified by the International Commission on Stratigraphy in July 2018. It has been proposed that the Meghalayan should be terminated c. 1950 and succeeded by a new stage provisionally called "Anthropocene".

In the Holocene's first millennium, the Palaeolithic began to be superseded by the Neolithic (New Stone) Age which lasted about 6,000 years, depending on location. The gradual transition period is sometimes termed Mesolithic (northern and western Europe) or Epipalaeolithic (Levant and Near East). The glaciers retreated as the world climate became warmer and that inspired an agricultural revolution, though at first, the dog was probably the only domesticated animal. This was accompanied by a social revolution in that humans gained from agriculture the impetus to settle. Settlement is the key precursor to civilisation, which cannot be achieved by a nomadic lifestyle.

The world population, c. 10,000 BC, is believed to have been more or less stable. It has been estimated that there were some five million people at the time of the Last Glacial Maximum, growing to forty million by 5000 BC and 100 million by 1600 BC, which is an average growth rate of 0.027% p.a. from the Neolithic to the Middle Bronze Age. Around 10,000 BC, most people lived in hunter-gatherer communities scattered across all continents except Antarctica and New Zealand. As the Würm/Wisconsin ended, settlement of northern regions was again possible.

== Beginnings of agriculture ==
Agriculture developed in different parts of the world at different times. In many places, people learned how to cultivate without outside help; elsewhere, as in western Europe, the skills were imported. A decrease in human height accompanied the rise of agriculture near the start of the Holocene period (10,000 BC) and was later correlated with urban population density.

The Natufian culture prevailed in the Levant through the 10th millennium and was unusual in that it supported a sedentary or semi-sedentary population even before the introduction of agriculture. An early example is ʿAin Mallaha, which may have been the first village in which people were wholly sedentary. The Natufian people are believed to have founded another early settlement on the site of Jericho (Tell es-Sultan) where there is evidence of building between 9600 BC and 8200 BC. Dates for the Natufian are indeterminate and range broadly from c. 13,050 BC to c. 7550 BC. It is possible that the early cultivation of figs began in the Jordan River valley sometime after the middle of the 10th millennium. Besides the fig trees, the people may have begun cultivation of wild plants such as barley and pistachio; and they possibly began herding goats, pigs and cattle.

Agriculture began to be developed by the various communities of the Fertile Crescent, which included the Levant, but it would not be widely practised for another 2,000 years by which time Neolithic culture was becoming well established in many parts of the Near East. Among the earliest cultivated plants were forms of millet and rice grown in the Middle East, possibly in this millennium but more likely after 9000 BC. By about 9500 BC, people in south-eastern Anatolia were harvesting wild grasses and grains. The earliest evidence of sheep herding has been found in northern Iraq, dated before 9000 BC.

== Pottery ==
Prehistoric chronology is almost entirely reliant upon the dating of material objects of which pottery is by far the most widespread and the most resistant to decay. All locations and generations developed their own shapes, sizes and styles of pottery, including methods and styles of decoration, but there was consistency among stratified deposits and even shards can be classified by time and place. Pottery is believed to have been discovered independently in various places, beginning with China c. 18,000 BC, and was probably created accidentally by fires lit on clay soil. The main discovery of pottery dated to the 10th millennium has been at Bosumpra Cave (early tenth-millennium cal. BC) on the Kwahu Plateau in southeastern Ghana and Ounjougou (c.9400 BC) in Central Mali, providing evidence of an independent invention of pottery in Sub-Saharan Africa in different climatic zones.

The first chronological pottery system was the Early, Middle and Late Minoan framework devised in the early 20th century by Sir Arthur Evans for his findings at Knossos. This covered the Bronze Age in twelve phases from c. 2800 BC to c. 1050 BC and the principle was later extended to mainland Greece (Helladic) and the Aegean islands (Cycladic). Dame Kathleen Kenyon was the principal archaeologist at Tell es-Sultan (ancient Jericho) and she discovered that there was no pottery there. The potter's wheel had not yet been invented and, where pottery as such was made, it was still hand-built, often by means of coiling, and pit fired.

Kenyon discovered vessels such as bowls, cups, and plates at Jericho which were made from stone. She reasonably surmised that others made from wood or vegetable fibres would have long since decayed. Using Evans' system as a benchmark, Kenyon divided the Near East Neolithic into phases called Pre-Pottery Neolithic A (PPNA), from c. 10,000 BC to c. 8800 BC; Pre-Pottery Neolithic B (PPNB), from c. 8800 BC to c. 6500 BC; and then Pottery Neolithic (PN), which had varied start-points from c. 6500 BC until the beginnings of the Bronze Age towards the end of the 4th millennium. In the 10th millennium, the Natufian culture co-existed with the PPNA which prevailed in the Levantine and upper Mesopotamian areas of the Fertile Crescent.

== Other cultural developments ==
=== Africa ===
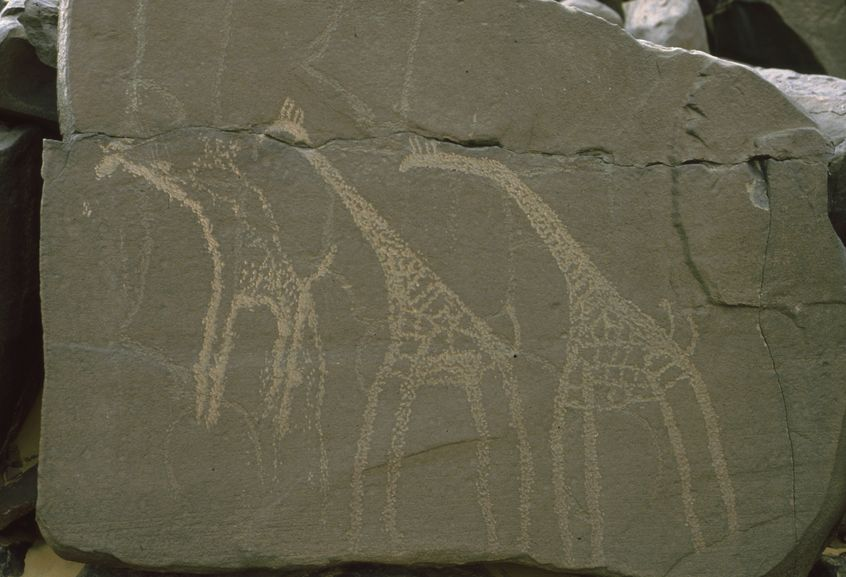
Example of Saharan rock art depicting giraffes from Anakom, Niger.

In North Africa, Saharan rock art engravings in what is known as the Bubalus (Large Wild Fauna) period have been dated to between 10,000 BC and 7000 BC. Wall paintings found in Ethiopia and Eritrea depict human activity; some of the older paintings are thought to date back to around 10,000 BC. In Prehistoric Egypt, a culture of hunter-gatherers replaced a grain grinding culture in 10,000 BC. The Abu Madi tel mounds in the Sinai Peninsula have been dated c. 9660 to c. 9180 BC.

=== Americas ===
The Clovis culture was widely distributed throughout North America. The people were hunter-gatherers and the culture's duration is believed to have been from c.9050 BC to c.8800 BC. There is evidence of increasing use of Clovis point tool technology for hunting.

Elsewhere in North America, the Petroglyphs at Winnemucca Lake, in what is today northwest Nevada, were carved by this time, possibly as early as 12.8 ka or as late as 10 ka.

=== Eurasia ===
The sites at Göbekli Tepe, which is home to megalithic structures, Hallan Çemi Tepesi, both in south-eastern Anatolia, and at Tell Qaramel, in north-west Syria, may have been occupied during this millennium. It was found out that gastronomy first emerged in Göbekli Tepe in this millennium. This most important discovery shedding light on the beginning of gastronomy in Anatolia consists of religious places in which feasts were held in this millennium that were found in the archaeological excavations conducted in Göbekli Tepe in Urfa province which is called the zero point of time. As a result of the investigations carried out in Göbekli Tepe which is dated to this millennium, it was determined that the people created cult structures and had a culture for religious purposes during the early Neolithic period and that they held feasts in which they offered foods while performing these cultures. The Sassi di Matera in southern Italy is believed to have been the site of human settlement since the Paleolithic period in this millennium, making it one of the oldest continuously inhabited settlements in history. At the Hasankeyf Mound in Turkey, Europe, almost all archaeological data date to this millennium. In Great Britain, which was not then an island, the Star Carr site in North Yorkshire is believed to have been inhabited by Maglemosian peoples for about 800 years from c. 9335 BC to c. 8525 BC.

The Bhimbetka rock shelters, which feature prehistoric cave paintings, earliest being dated to 10,000 BCE, corresponds to the Indian Mesolithic. These sites would have been home to a nomadic/hunting society existing in this region.

== Environmental changes ==
Subdivisions of the Quaternary Period
System/ Period	Series/ Epoch	Stage/ Age	Age	
Quaternary	Holocene	Meghalayan	0	4,200
Quaternary	Holocene	Northgrippian	4,200	8,200
Quaternary	Holocene	Greenlandian	8,200	11,700
Quaternary	Pleistocene	'Upper'	11,700	129 ka
Quaternary	Pleistocene	Chibanian	129 ka	774 ka
Quaternary	Pleistocene	Calabrian	774 ka	1.80 Ma
Quaternary	Pleistocene	Gelasian	1.80 Ma	2.58 Ma
Neogene	Pliocene	Piacenzian	2.58 Ma	3.60 Ma
Notes and references Subdivision of the Quaternary Period according to the ICS, as of January 2020. For the Holocene, dates are relative to the year 2000 (e.g. Greenlandian began 11,700 years before 2000). For the beginning of the Northgrippian a date of 8,236 years before 2000 has been set. The Meghalayan has been set to begin 4,250 years before 2000. 'Tarantian' is an informal, unofficial name proposed for a stage/age to replace the equally informal, unofficial 'Upper Pleistocene' subseries/subepoch. In Europe and North America, the Holocene is subdivided into Preboreal, Boreal, Atlantic, Subboreal, and Subatlantic stages of the Blytt–Sernander time scale. There are many regional subdivisions for the Upper or Late Pleistocene; usually these represent locally recognized cold (glacial) and warm (interglacial) periods. The last glacial period ends with the cold Younger Dryas substage.

In the southern hemisphere, rising sea levels had gradually formed Bass Strait, separating Tasmania from mainland Australia. This process is believed to have been complete by about the beginning of the 10th millennium. Bass Strait had been a plain populated by indigenous people who are thought to have first arrived around 40,000 years ago.

The Wisconsin glaciation had sheeted much of North America and, as it retreated, its meltwaters created an immense proglacial lake now known as Lake Agassiz. Sometime after 10,000 BC, the retreating glaciers created the rock formation on Cannon Mountain in present-day New Hampshire that was known as the Old Man of the Mountain until its collapse in 2003.

== Chronological method ==
The ongoing Quaternary System/Period represents the last 2.58 million years since the end of the Neogene and is officially divided into the Pleistocene and Holocene Series/Epochs. The Holocene has been assigned an age of 11,700 calendar years before 2000 CE which means it began c. 9700 BC in the 10th millennium. It is preceded in the geological time scale by the Late Pleistocene sub-epoch, also known as the Tarantian Stage/Age, which awaits formal ratification by the International Union of Geological Sciences (IUGS) and tentatively spans the time from c. 126,000 BC to c. 9700 BC. Preceding the Late Pleistocene is the Middle Pleistocene sub-epoch, or Chibanian Stage/Age, which also awaits ratification and tentatively spans the time from c. 773,000 BC to c. 126,000 BC. The Early Pleistocene from c. 2,580,000 BC until c. 773,000 is sub-divided into two Stages/Ages which have been officially defined: the Gelasian (until c. 1,800,000 BC) and the Calabrian.

The Holocene calendar, devised by Cesare Emiliani in 1993, places its epoch at 10,000 BC (with the year 2026 being rendered as 12026 HE). The Human Era calendar attempts to simplify the calculation of time spans across the BC-CE divide by designating a more universally relevant epoch date: the start of human settlements (instead of the birth of Jesus Christ). CE dates can be converted by adding 10,000 years; converting BC dates requires subtraction from 10,001 (since the Gregorian calendar lacks a year zero).

== Bibliography ==
=== Books ===
- Bellwood, Peter (2004). First Farmers: The Origins of Agricultural Societies. Hoboken: Wiley-Blackwell. ISBN 978-06-31205-66-1.
- Bronowski, Jacob (1973). The Ascent of Man. London: BBC. ISBN 978-18-49901-15-4.
- Bury, J. B.; Meiggs, Russell (1975) [1900]. A History of Greece (Fourth ed.). London: Macmillan Press. ISBN 978-03-33154-92-2.
- Chazan, Michael (2017). World Prehistory and Archaeology: Pathways Through Time. Abingdon: Routledge. ISBN 978-13-51802-89-5.
- Edwards, Phillip C. (2012). Wadi Hammeh 27, an Early Natufian Settlement at Pella in Jordan. Leiden: Brill. ISBN 978-90-04236-09-7.
- Freedman, D. N.; Myers, Allen C.; Beck, Astrid B. (2000). Eerdmans Dictionary of the Bible. Grand Rapids, Michigan: William B. Eerdmans. ISBN 978-08-02824-00-4.
- García-Puchol, Oreto; Salazar-García, Domingo C. (2017). Times of Neolithic Transition along the Western Mediterranean. New York City: Springer. ISBN 978-33-19529-39-4.
- Kuijt, Ian (2000). Life in Neolithic farming communities: social organization, identity, and differentiation. New York City: Springer. ISBN 978-03-06461-22-4.
- Mazurowski, Ryszard F.; Kanjou, Youssef, eds. (2012). Tell Qaramel 1999–2007. Protoneolithic and early Pre-Pottery Neolithic settlement in Northern Syria. PCMA Excavation Series 2. Warsaw: Polish Centre of Mediterranean Archaeology, University of Warsaw. ISBN 978-83-90379-63-0.
- Milner, Nicky; Conneller, Chantal; Taylor, Barry, eds. (2018). Star Carr, Volume 1: A Persistent Place in a Changing World. York: White Rose University Press. ISBN 978-19-12482-04-7.
- Mithen, Steven (2003). After The Ice. London: Weidenfeld & Nicolson. ISBN 978-07-53813-92-8.
- Ojakangas, R. W.; Matsch, C. L. (1982). Minnesota's Geology. Minneapolis: University of Minnesota Press. ISBN 978-08-16609-53-6.
- Pankhurst, Richard (1998). The Ethiopians. Oxford: Blackwell Publishers Ltd. ISBN 978-06-31184-68-3.
- Richard, Suzanne (2004). Near Eastern archaeology. University Park, Pennsylvania: Eisenbrauns. ISBN 978-15-75060-83-5.
- Roberts, J. M. (1993). Shorter Illustrated History of the World. Abingdon: Helicon Publishing Ltd. ISBN 978-01-95115-04-8.
- Teeple, John B. (2002). Timelines of World History. London: Dorling Kindersley Ltd. ISBN 978-07-51337-42-6.
- Visonà, Monica Blackmun (2008). A History of Art in Africa (2nd ed.). New York City: Pearson Education. ISBN 978-01-36128-72-4.

=== Journals ===
- Kislev, M. E.; Hartmann, A.; Bar-Yosef, O. (2006a). "Early Domesticated Fig in the Jordan Valley". Science. 312 (5778). Washington, D.C.: American Association for the Advancement of Science: 1372–1374. Bibcode:2006Sci...312.1372K. doi:10.1126/science.1125910. PMID 16741119. S2CID 42150441.
- Kislev, M. E.; Hartmann, A.; Bar-Yosef, O. (2006b). "Response to Comment on "Early Domesticated Fig in the Jordan Valley"". Science. 314 (5806). Washington, D.C.: American Association for the Advancement of Science: 1683b. Bibcode:2006Sci...314.1683K. doi:10.1126/science.1133748.
- Lev-Yadun, S.; Ne'Eman, G.; Abbo, S.; Flaishman, M. A. (2006). "Comment on "Early Domesticated Fig in the Jordan Valley"". Science. 314 (5806). Washington, D.C.: American Association for the Advancement of Science: 1683a. Bibcode:2006Sci...314.1683L. doi:10.1126/science.1132636. PMID 17170278.
