= Early Pleistocene =

Unofficial Pleistocene sub-epoch

Subdivisions of the Quaternary Period
System/ Period	Series/ Epoch	Stage/ Age	Age	
Quaternary	Holocene	Meghalayan	0	4,200
Quaternary	Holocene	Northgrippian	4,200	8,200
Quaternary	Holocene	Greenlandian	8,200	11,700
Quaternary	Pleistocene	'Upper'	11,700	129 ka
Quaternary	Pleistocene	Chibanian	129 ka	774 ka
Quaternary	Pleistocene	Calabrian	774 ka	1.80 Ma
Quaternary	Pleistocene	Gelasian	1.80 Ma	2.58 Ma
Neogene	Pliocene	Piacenzian	2.58 Ma	3.60 Ma
Notes and references Subdivision of the Quaternary Period according to the ICS, as of January 2020. For the Holocene, dates are relative to the year 2000 (e.g. Greenlandian began 11,700 years before 2000). For the beginning of the Northgrippian a date of 8,236 years before 2000 has been set. The Meghalayan has been set to begin 4,250 years before 2000. 'Tarantian' is an informal, unofficial name proposed for a stage/age to replace the equally informal, unofficial 'Upper Pleistocene' subseries/subepoch. In Europe and North America, the Holocene is subdivided into Preboreal, Boreal, Atlantic, Subboreal, and Subatlantic stages of the Blytt–Sernander time scale. There are many regional subdivisions for the Upper or Late Pleistocene; usually these represent locally recognized cold (glacial) and warm (interglacial) periods. The last glacial period ends with the cold Younger Dryas substage.

The Early Pleistocene is a subseries in the international geologic timescale in chronostratigraphy, representing the earliest division of the Pleistocene Epoch within the ongoing Quaternary Period. It is currently estimated to span the time between 2.580 ± 0.005 Ma (million years ago) and 0.773 ± 0.005 Ma. The term Early Pleistocene encompasses both the Gelasian Age and the Calabrian Age.

The Gelasian and the Calabrian have officially been defined by the International Union of Geological Sciences (IUGS) to effectively constitute the Early Pleistocene.
