= Older Dryas =

Geological period of the Earth

The Older Dryas (Note: The standard sequence between about 16,000 and 11,700 years ago is Oldest Dryas (cold), then Bølling oscillation (warm), then Older Dryas (cold), then Allerød oscillation (warm), then Younger Dryas (cold). A few experts (confusingly) use the terms Old or Older instead of Oldest and Middle or Medium instead of Older.) was a stadial (cold) period between the Bølling and Allerød interstadials (warmer phases), about 14,000 years Before Present, towards the end of the Pleistocene. Its date range is not well defined, with estimates varying by 400 years, but its duration is agreed to have been around two centuries.

The gradual warming since the Last Glacial Maximum (27,000 to 24,000 years BP) has been interrupted by two cold spells: the Older Dryas and the Younger Dryas (c. 12,900–11,650 BP). In northern Scotland, the glaciers were thicker and deeper during the Older Dryas than the succeeding Younger Dryas, and there is no evidence of human occupation of Britain. In Northwestern Europe there was also an earlier Oldest Dryas (18.5–17 ka BP 15–14 ka BP). The Dryas are named after an indicator genus, the Arctic and Alpine plant Dryas octopetala, the remains of which are found in higher concentrations in deposits from colder periods.

The Older Dryas was a variable cold, dry Blytt–Sernander period, observed in climatological evidence in only some regions, dependent on latitude. In regions in which it is not observed, the Bølling–Allerød is considered a single interstadial period. Evidence of the Older Dryas is strongest in northern Eurasia, particularly part of Northern Europe, roughly equivalent to Pollen zone Ic.

== Dates ==
In the Greenland oxygen isotope record, the Older Dryas appears as a downward peak establishing a small, low-intensity gap between the Bølling and the Allerød. That configuration presents a difficulty in estimating its time, as it is more of a point than a segment. The segment is small enough to escape the resolution of most carbon-14 series, as the points are not close enough together to find the segment.

One approach to the problem assigns a point and then picks an arbitrary segment. The Older Dryas is sometimes considered to be "centered" near 14,100 BP or to be 100 to 150 years long "at" 14,250 BP.

A second approach finds carbon-14 or other dates as close to the end of the Bølling and the beginning of the Allerød as possible and then selects endpoints that are based on them: for example, 14,000–13,700 BP.

The best approach attempts to include the Older Dryas in a sequence of points as close together as possible (high resolution) or within a known event.

For example, pollen from the island of Hokkaidō, Japan, records a larch pollen peak and matching sphagnum decline at 14,600–13700 BP. In the White Sea, a cooling occurred at 14,700–13,400/13,000, which resulted in a re-advance of the glacier in the initial Allerød. In Canada, the Shulie Lake phase, a re-advance, is dated to 14,000–13,500 BP. On the other hand, varve chronology in southern Sweden indicates a range of 14,050–13,900 BP.

== Description ==
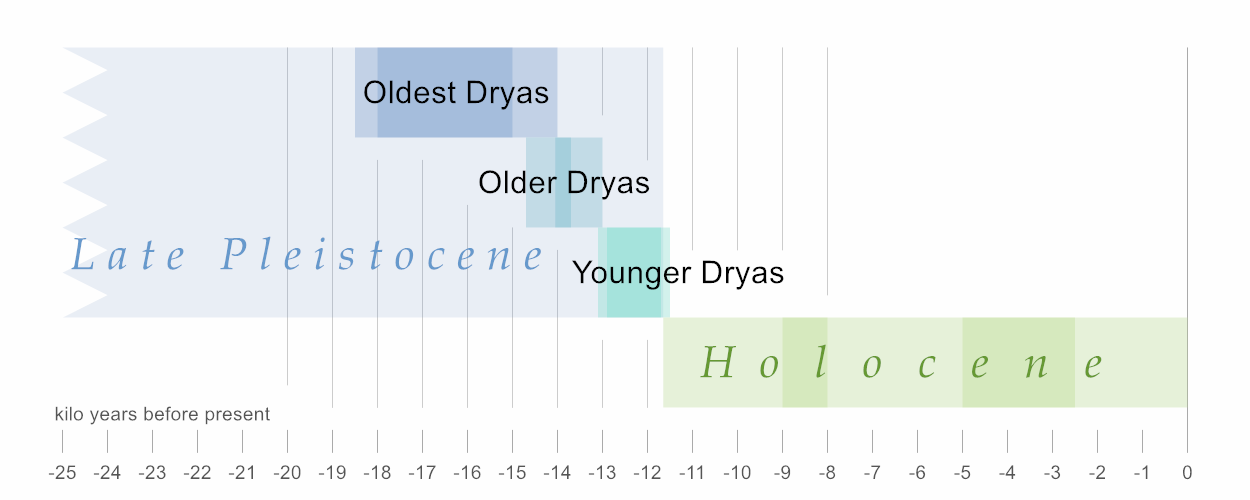
Dryas stadials

Northern Europe offered an alternation of steppe and tundra environments depending on the permafrost line and the latitude. In moister regions, around lakes and streams, were thickets of dwarf birch, willow, sea buckthorn, and juniper. In the river valleys and uplands, to the south, were open birch forests.

The first trees, birch and pine, had spread into Northern Europe 500 years earlier. During the Older Dryas, the glacier re-advanced, and the trees retreated southward, to be replaced by a mixture of grassland and cool-weather alpine species. The biome has been called "Park Tundra," "Arctic tundra," "Arctic pioneer vegetation," or “birch woodlands." It is now in the transition between taiga and tundra in Siberia. Then, it stretched from Siberia to Great Britain, in a more-or-less unbroken expanse.

To the northwest was the Baltic ice lake, which was truncated by the edge of the glacier. Species had access to Denmark and southern Sweden. Most of Finland and the Baltic countries were under the ice or the lake for most of the period. Northern Scandinavia was glaciated. Between Britain and Continental Europe were rolling hills prolifically populated with animals. Thousands of specimens, hundreds of tons of bones, have been recovered from the bottom of the North Sea, called "Doggerland," and they continue to be recovered.

There are many more species found for the period than in this article. Most families were more diverse than they are today, and they were yet more so in the last interglacial. A great extinction, especially of mammals, continued throughout the end of the Pleistocene, and it may be continuing today.

== Evidence ==
The Older Dryas is a period of cooling during the Bølling–Allerød warming, estimated to be from 13,900 to 13,600 years before present (BP), and the estimated ages can vary using different age dating methods. Numerous studies on chronology and palaeoclimate of last deglaciation show a cooling event within Bølling–Allerød warming that reflects the occurrence of Older Dryas. The determination of paleotemperatures varies from study to study depending on the sample collected. δ^{18}O measurements are most common when analyzing Ice core samples whereas the changing abundance pattern of fauna and flora are most commonly used when examining lake sediments. Moraine belts are usually studied in places with palaeoglacier presented. As for ocean sediments, the variations of alkenone levels and faunal abundances were measured to model paleotemperatures in separate studies shown in the following sections.

=== Ice core δ^{18}O evidence ===
The North Greenland Ice Core Project (GRIP) members drilled an undisturbed ice core from North Greenland (75.1 8N, 42.3 8W). The ice core record showed a cold oscillation between 14,025 to13,904 years BP, which is reflected in the increased δ^{18}O during this period. This cold oscillation was also observed in earlier ice core records (GRIP and GISP2) drilled in the early 1990s by GRIP members.

=== Lake sediment evidence ===
A multi-proxy study on late glacial lake sediments of Moervaart palaeolake shows multiple pieces of evidence in various aspects to support Older Dryas.

The lake sediment had an erosional surface prior to Older Dryas suggesting a change to colder climate. Microstructure observation of the sediments shows that fossil soil wedges or frost cracks were observed in the top of Older Dryas deposits, which indicates mean annual air temperatures below −1 to 0 °C and cold winters. This conclusion is also supported by the presence of Juniperus, which indicates a protecting snow cover in winter. This change is also shown on the records at the Rieme sites on the Great SandRidge of Maldegem-Stekene at Snellegem in NW Belgium, and many other sites in north-western Europe.

δ^{18}O measurements show a decreasing trend in δ^{18}O at the transition to the Older Dryas, which corresponds to the ice core record of precipitation in the northern hemisphere.

Pollen analysis shows a temporary decrease in the pollen levels of trees and shrubs with a short-term increase in herbaceous pollen. The changed pollen pattern suggests an increased abundance of grass as well as a retreat of tree and shrubs. The change in vegetation distribution further indicates a colder and drier climate during this period. As for aquatic plant evidence, both aquatic and semi-aquatic botanical taxa show a sharp decrease, suggesting lower lake levels caused by a drier climate. The drier climate is also reflected by increased salinity indicated by diatom analysis.

The change in Chironomids population also indicates a colder climate. Microtendipes is an indicator of intermediate temperature in Late glacial deposits in northern Europe (Brooks and Birks, 2001). The abundance of Microtendipes peaked in the early part of Older Dryas suggesting a cold oscillation. The mollusc data (Valvata piscinalis as a cold-water indicator) suggests a lower summer temperature compared to previous Bølling period.

=== Ocean sediment evidence ===
Recent research on sea surface temperature (SST) for the past 15,000 years in southern Okinawa modelled the Paleoclimate of ocean sediment core (ODP 1202B) using an alkenone analysis. The results show a cooling stage at 14,300 to 13,700 years BP between Bølling and Allerød warm phases, corresponding to the Older Dryas event.

Another study on an ocean sediment core from the Norwegian Trench also suggests a cooling between Bølling and Allerød warm phases. The glacial polar faunal study on ocean sediment core Troll 3.1 based on Neogloboquadrina pachyderma abundances suggests that there were two cooling events before Younger Dryas in which one of the events occurred within Bølling-Allerød interstadial and can be associated with Older Dryas.

=== Moraine evidence ===
The study on late-glacial climate change in the White Mountains (New Hampshire, USA) refined the deglaciation history of the White Mountain Moraine System (WMMS) by mapping moraine belts and related lake sequences. The result suggests that the Littleton-Bethlehem (L-B) readvance of the ice sheet occurred between 14,000 and 13,800 years BP. The L-B readvance coincided with the Older Dryas events and provides the first well-documented and dated evidence of Older Dryas.

Another Glacial chronology and palaeoclimate study on moraine suggests a cold oscillation in the second late-glacial (LG2) following the first late-glacial readvance (LG1) at around 14,000±700 to 13,700±1200 years BP. The LG2 cold oscillation around 14,000 years BP can correspond to the cooling of Greenland Interstadial 1 (GI-1d-Older Dryas) that happened around the same time period, which is the first chronological evidence that supports the presence of Older Dryas in the Tatra Mountains.

== Flora ==
Older Dryas species are usually found in the sediment below the bottom layer of the bog. Indicator species are the Alpine plants:

- Betula pubescens or downy birch (Central Europe);
- Pinaceae or pine family (Poland);
- Dryas octopetala, or dryas;
- Salix herbacea, or dwarf willow;
- Oxyria digyna, or mountain sorrel.

Grasslands species are the following:

- Artemisia, sagebrush or wormwood;
- Ephedra, or joint-fir.
- Hippophae

== Fauna ==
A well-stocked biozone prevailed on the Arctic plains and thickets of the Late Pleistocene. Plains mammals were most predominant:

Artiodactyls:

- Bison priscus, the steppe wisent or steppe bison
- Rangifer tarandus, the reindeer or caribou
- Megaloceros giganteus, the Irish elk
- Alces alces, the elk
- Cervus elaphus, the red deer
- Ovibos moschatus, the musk ox
- Saiga tatarica, the saiga

Perissodactyls:

- Equus ferus, the wild horse. Many authors refer to it as Equus caballus, but the latter term is most correctly reserved for the domestic horse. Ferus is presumed to be one or more ancestral or related stocks to caballus and has been described as "caballine".
- Coelodonta antiquitatis, woolly rhinoceros

Proboscidea:

- Mammuthus primigenius, the woolly mammoth

So much meat on the hoof must have supported large numbers of Carnivora: Ursidae:

- Ursus arctos, the brown bear
- Ursus spelaeus, the cave bear

Hyaenidae:

- Crocuta crocuta, the spotted hyena

Felidae:

- Panthera spelaea, the cave lion

Canidae:

- Canis lupus, the wolf
- Alopex lagopus, the Arctic fox

Mustelidae:

- Gulo gulo, the wolverine

The sea also had its share of carnivores; their maritime location made them survive until modern times: Phocidae:

- Pagophilus groenlandica, the harp seal
- Pusa hispida, the ringed seal

Odobenidae:

- Odobenus rosmarus, the walrus

Of the Cetacean Odontoceti, the Monodontidae:

- Delphinapterus leucas, the beluga

Delphinidae:

- Orcinus orca, the killer whale

Of the Mysticetian Eschrichtiidae:

- Eschrictius robustus, the gray whale

The top of the food chain was supported by larger numbers of smaller animals farther down, which lived in the herbaceous blanket covering the tundra or steppe and helped maintain it by carrying seeds, manuring and aerating it.

Leporidae:

- Lepus tanaiticus, the hare

Ochotonidae:

- Ochotona spelaeus, the pika

Cricetidae:

- Lemmus obensis, Siberian lemming
- Dicrostonix, collared lemming
- Lagurus lagurus, steppe lemming
- Microtus gregalis, narrow-headed vole
- Arvicola terrestris, water vole

Sciuridae:

- Spermophilus, ground squirrel

Dipodidae:

- Allactaga jaculus, the jerboa

== Humans ==
Eurasia was populated by Homo sapiens sapiens (Cro-Magnon man) during the late Upper Paleolithic. Bands of humans survived by hunting the mammals of the plains. In the Northern Europe they preferred reindeer, in Ukraine the woolly mammoth. They sheltered in huts and manufactured tools around campfires. Ukrainian shelters were supported by mammoth tusks. Humans were already established across Siberia and North America.

Two domestic dogs (Canis familiaris) have been found in late Pleistocene Ukraine and were a heavy breed, similar to a Great Dane, perhaps useful to run down Elephantidae. The large number of mammoth bones at campsites make it clear that even then, the Elephantidae in Europe were approaching the limit of their duration. Their bones were used for many purposes, one being the numerous objects of art, including an engraved star map.

Late Upper Palaeolithic culture was by no means uniform. Many local traditions have been defined. The Hamburgian culture had occupied the lowlands and Northern Germany before the Older Dryas. During the Older Dryas, contemporaneous with the Havelte Group of the late Hamburgian, the Federmesser culture appeared and occupied Denmark and southern Sweden, following the reindeer. South of the Hamburgian was the longstanding Magdalenian. In Ukraine was the Moldovan, which used tusks to build shelters.

== See also ==
- Younger Dryas
- Oldest Dryas
