= Heinrich Dau =

Johann Heinrich Christfried Dau (1790–1831) was a Holstein-Danish geologist and writer, whose identification of peat layers led eventually to a system of classifying and dating post-glacial northern European paleoclimate periods, the Blytt–Sernander sequences based on peat stratigraphy.

He died at Altona, Hamburg in 1831.

== Selected publications ==
- Neues Handbuch über Torf, dessen Natur, Entstehung und Wiedererzeugung, Nutzen im Allgemeinen und für den Staat, Leipzig, 1823.
- Allerunterthänigster Bericht an die Königliche Dänische Rentekammer über die Torfmoore Seelands nach einer im Herbste 1828 deshalb unternommenen Reise. Copenhagen and Leipzig, 1829.
- Om Retfærdighed og Frihed og deres nødvendige Samværen, især i politisk Henseende, Copenhagen, 1831.
