= Pollen zone =

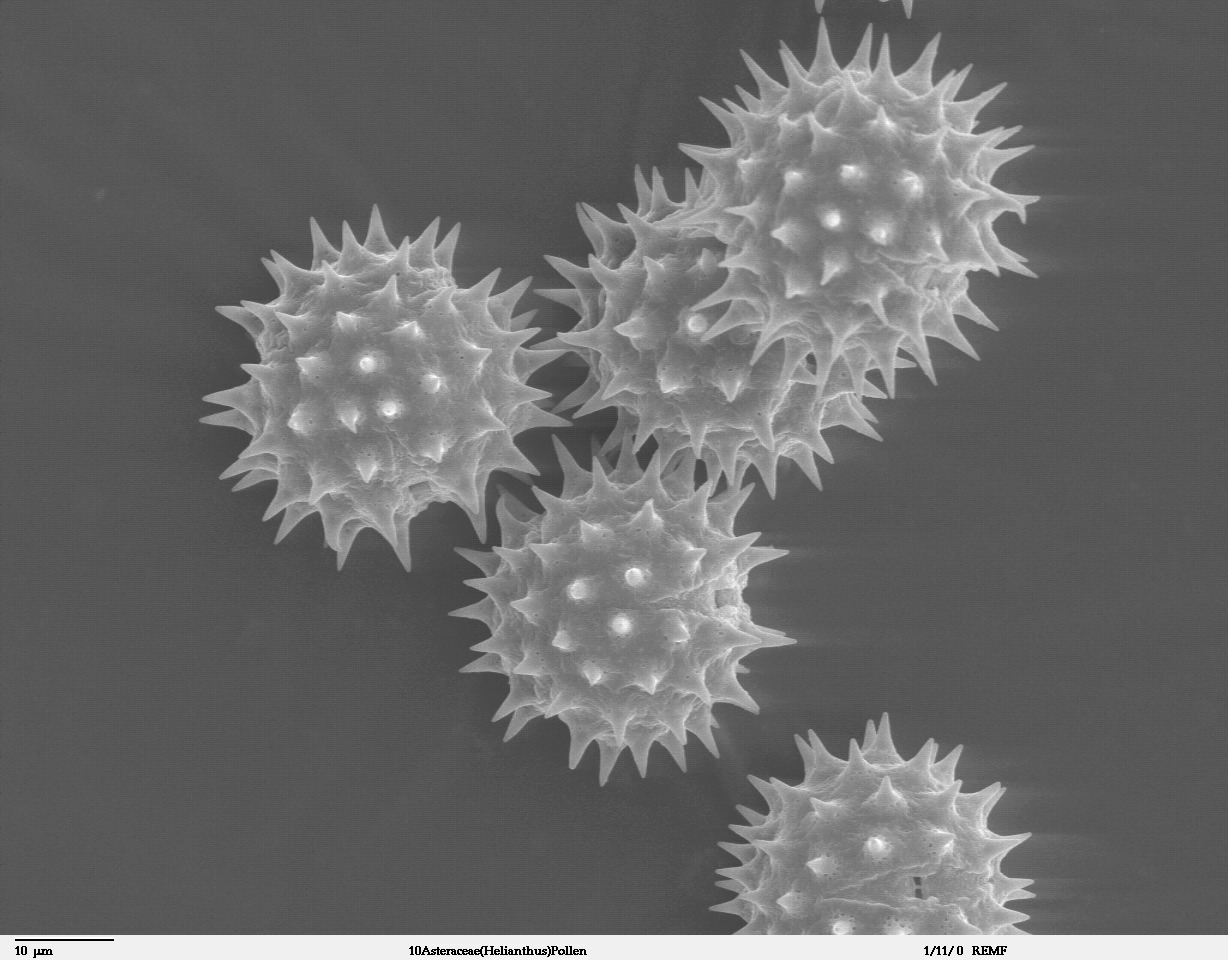
Helianthus annuus pollen

Pollen zones are a system of subdividing the Last Glacial Period and Holocene paleoclimate using the data from pollen cores. The sequence provides a global chronological structure to a wide variety of researchers, such as geologists, climatologists, geographers and archaeologists, who study the physical and cultural environment of the last 15,000 years.

== History ==
The palynological aspects of the system were first investigated extensively by the Swedish palynologist Lennart von Post in the years before the First World War. By analysing pollen in core samples taken from peat bogs, von Post noticed that different plant species were represented in bands through the cores.

The differing species and differing quantities of the same species are caused by changes in climate. Von Post was able to confirm the Blytt–Sernander climatic sequence showing fluctuations between warmer and colder periods across thousands of years. He used local peat sequences combined with varve dating to produce a regional climatic chronology for Scandinavia.

In 1940 Harry Godwin began applying von Post's methods to pollen cores from the British Isles to produce the wider European sequence accepted today. It basically expanded the Blytt-Sernander further into the late Pleistocene and refined some of its periods. Following the Second World War, the technique spread to the Americas.

Currently scientists are focusing a repertory of several different methods on core samples in peat, ice, lake and ocean bottoms, and sediments to achieve "high resolution" dating not possible to only one method: carbon dating, dendrochronology, isotope ratios on a number of gases, studies of insects and molluscs, and others. While often doubting the utility of the modified Bytt-Sernander, they seem to confirm and expand it all the more.

== Notes on the sequence table ==
At present nine main pollen zones, I-IX, are defined, based on the work of J. Iversen, published in 1954. These are matched to period names called "biostratigraphic divisions" in the table, which were defined for Denmark by Iverson based on layers in the peat bogs. They represent climatic and biological zones in the peat.

Others have used these names in different senses, such as the 1974 chronozones of J. Mangerud. The sequences in Germany and Sweden are not exactly the same as those in Denmark, inviting scientists there to use the names still differently or make other definitions. Moreover, the names are apt to be used interchangeably for glacials, interglacials, stadial, interstadials, or oscillations, leading some scientists to deplore the lack of system.

The system of the table below covers from around 13,000 BC to the modern day. Dates, given in years BC, are best viewed as being based on uncalibrated C-14 dates, which, when calibrated, would result in much earlier BC dates. For example, an Older Dryas start date of 10,000 BC translates roughly into an uncalibrated BP date of 12,000. Calibrated, that becomes 14,000 BP, 12,000 BC. To obtain quick, on-line calibrations, you may use CalPal.

The dates in the table correspond relatively well to more modern dates for the earlier periods. Larger discrepancies begin at the end of the Boreal. More, and more modern, details on the dating of the periods are given under the article for each one.

The archaeological periods listed only apply to north Europe, and do so approximately. For example, there is no uniform chronozone, "the Bronze Age", which would apply globally or even be of the same dates between north and south Europe.

The geological stages listed are only defined for the British Isles. Scientists use different names for north Europe, south Europe and other regions. However, they are cross-correlated in the articles for the ones listed.

In contrast to glacial periods, these pollen zones are being used to apply globally, with but few exceptions. It is acceptable, for example, to refer to the "Younger Dryas" of Antarctica, which has no pollen of its own. A few scientists disapprove of such uses.

== Sequence table ==
European Pollen Zones
Zone	Biostratigraphic division	Dates	Dominant plant type	Archaeological periods	Geological stage
IX	Sub-Atlantic	500 BC to present	Spread of grasses and pine and beech woodland	Iron Age onwards	Flandrian
VIII	Sub-Boreal	3000–500 BC	Mixed oak forest	Bronze Age and Iron Age	Flandrian
VII	Atlantic	5500 -3000 BC	Mixed oak forest	Neolithic and Bronze Age	Flandrian
V and VI	Boreal	c.7700–5500 BC	Pine/birch forest and increasing mixed forest	Mesolithic	Flandrian
IV	Pre-Boreal	c.8300–7700 BC	Birch forest	Late Upper Palaeolithic and early–mid Mesolithic	Devensian glaciation and Flandrian
III	Younger Dryas	c. 8800 - 8300 BC	Tundra	Late Upper Palaeolithic	Devensian
II	Allerød oscillation	c. 9800 - 8800 BC	Tundra, Park Tundra and birch forest	Late Upper Palaeolithic	Devensian
Ic	Older Dryas	c. 10,000 - 9800 BC	Tundra	Late Upper Palaeolithic	Devensian
Ib	Bølling oscillation	c.10,500–10,000 BC	Park Tundra	Late Upper Palaeolithic	Devensian
Ia	Oldest Dryas	c.13,000–10,500 BC	Tundra	Late Upper Palaeolithic	Devensian
