= Park Tundra =

Plant community in Europe

Park tundra was a plant community that occurred in northwestern Europe after the last ice age ended.

== History ==
The community was similar to that found today at the boundary between tundra and taiga in Siberia: species included the dwarf birch and the least willow. Park tundra stretched as far south as the Alps and the Pyrenees. Park tundra was common during the colder post-glacial periods, such as the Older Dryas (12,000-10,000 BCE) and the Younger Dryas (8,800-8,300 BCE).
