= Subboreal =

Climatic period of the Holocene

The Subboreal is a climatic period, immediately before the present one, the subatlantic period. Both are part of the Holocene epoch. It lasted from 3710 to 450 BCE. During this time, conditions on earth were somewhat warmer and drier than the present with lower levels of carbon dioxide. There were important changes to vegetation, sea level, and the expansion of human civilizations, and the first instances of human recorded history.

== Etymology ==
The composite scientific term Subboreal, meaning "below the Boreal," is derived from the Latin sub (below, under) and the Greek Βορέας, from Boreas, the god of the North Wind. The word was first introduced in 1889 by Rutger Sernander to distinguish it from Axel Blytt's Boreal, which had been established in 1876.

== History ==
The Subboreal followed the Atlantic and was followed by the Subatlantic. The Subboreal is equivalent to W. H. Zagwijn's pollen zones IVa and IVb and T. Litt's pollen zone VIII. In the pollen scheme of Fritz Theodor Overbeck, it occupies pollen zone X.

In paleoclimatology, it is divided into an Older Subboreal and a Younger Subboreal. Historically, the Subboreal is equivalent to most of the Eneolithic and the entire Bronze Age, which started 4200 to 3800 years ago, as well as the start of the Iron Age.

This period was also when humans first began recording history, at about 2900 BCE, with the rise of the Sumer, Indus Valley Civilization, Ancient Egypt and various other civilizations in the Ancient Near East.

== Dating ==
The Subboreal is usually defined as 5660 to 3710 years before the present (BP). The lower limit is flexible, as some authors prefer to use 4400 BCE, or 6350 BP even 4830 BC, or 6780 BP. Others use 5000 calendar years, or 3050 BCE. The upper limit of the Subboreal and, therefore the beginning of the Subatlantic, is also flexible and can be attributed to 1170 to 830 BCE, but it is usually fixed at 450 BCE. In varve years, the Subboreal corresponds to 5660 to 2750 years BP.

The boundary between the older and the younger Subboreal is considered to be 1350 BCE.

== Climatic evolution ==
Temperature variations during the Holocene

The climate was generally drier and slightly cooler (by about 0.1 °C) than in the preceding Atlantic but still warmer than during the 20th century. The temperatures were 0.7 °C higher than during the following Subatlantic. Consequently, in Scandinavia the lower limit of glaciers was 100 to 200 m higher than during the Subatlantic. On the whole, the oscillating temperatures slightly receded in the course of the Subboreal by about 0.3 °C.

In the Aegean, the beginning of the Subboreal was marked by a pronounced drought, centered around 5600 years BP. Of far greater importance was the coming to an end of the African Humid Period, reflected in the lakes of subtropical Africa (such as Lake Chad) experiencing a rapid fall in their water levels. During the interval 5000 to 4000 years BP, drier conditions in southern Mesopotamia caused great demographic changes and the abandonment of settlings due to extreme aridity.

In Germany, a drastic climatic cooling can be observed around 5000 varve years BP in the maars of the Eifel. In the preceding interval lasting from 8200 till 5000 varve years (Holocene Climatic Optimum), the July temperatures were on average still 1 °C higher. At the same time, the January temperatures were rising and the yearly precipitation increased.

In Northern Africa and in the Near East, the interval from 4700 to 4100 years BP had renewed and lasting dry conditions, as is indicated by lake level minima. Between 4500 and 4100 years BP, monsoonal precipitations weakened, a possible cause for the upheavals that led to the end of the Old Kingdom of Egypt.

The Levant shows a similar climatic evolution. The dry conditions prevailing in Mesopotamia around 4200 years BP probably resulted in the downfall of the Akkadian Empire.

=== Carbon dioxide ===
Levels of carbon dioxide had reached at the beginning of the Subboreal its Holocene minimal value of 260 ppm. During the Subboreal, it started rising and reached 293 ppm at the end of the period. As a comparison, today's value is over 400 ppm.

== Vegetation history ==
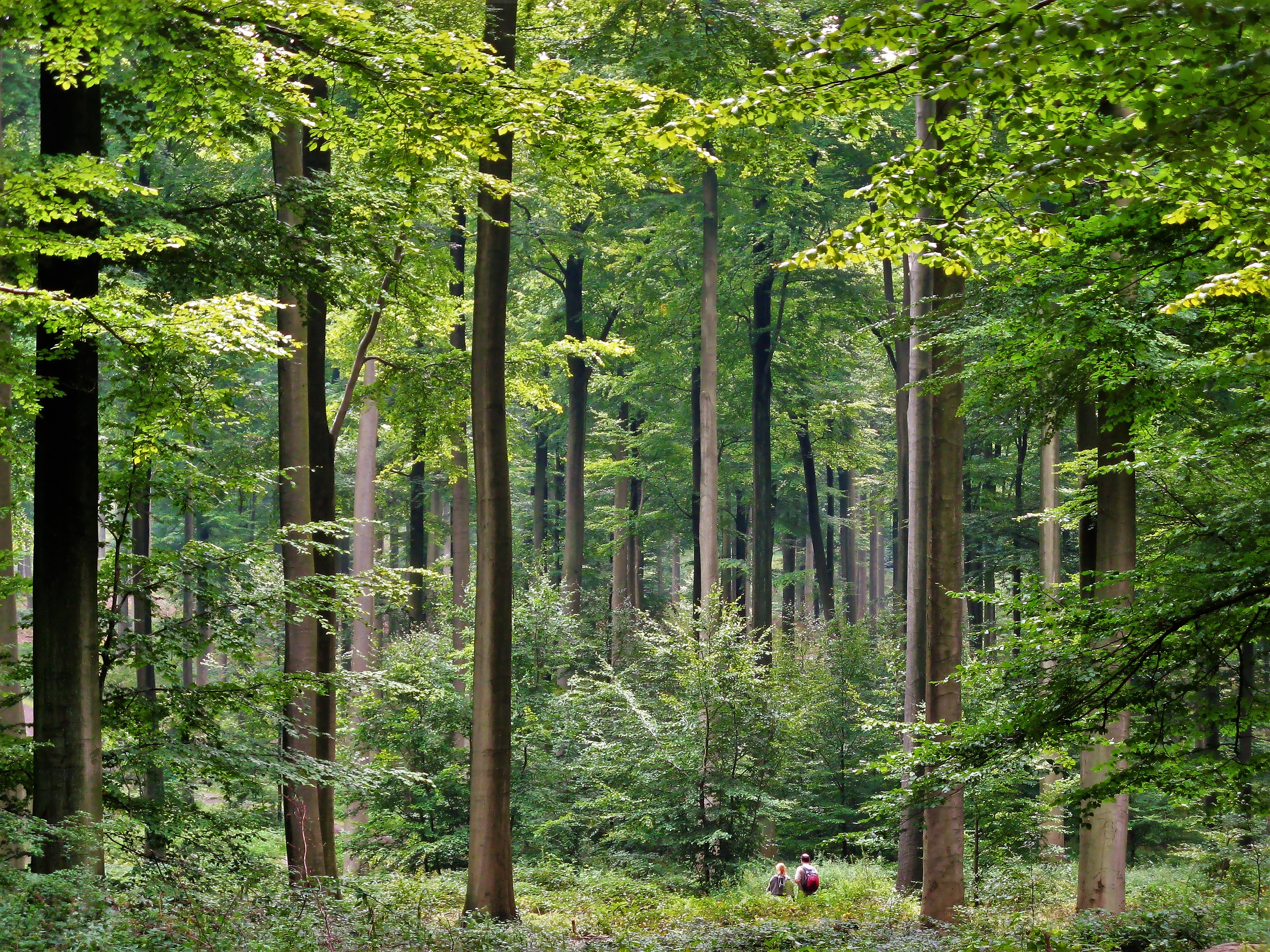
Stand of beech trees in the Sonian Forest near Brussels, Belgium

In Scandinavia, the Atlantic/Subboreal boundary shows a distinct vegetational change. That is less pronounced in Western Europe, but its typical mixed oak forest shows quite a fast decline in elm and linden. The decline in linden is not fully understood and might be due to cooling or human interference. The decline in elm is most likely due to elm disease, caused by the ascomycete Ceratocystis ulmi, but climatic changes and anthropogenic pressure on the forests certainly must be considered as well. The decline in elm, with a recession from 20 to 4%, as observed in Eifel maar pollen, has been dated in Central and Northern Europe as from 4000 years BC, but it more likely was diachronous over the interval 4350 to 3780 BC.

Another important event was the immigration of European beech (Fagus sylvatica) and hornbeam (Carpinus betulus) from their retreats on the Balkan and south of the Apennines. That happened also diachronously: beech pollen are found for the first time in the interval 4340 to 3540 BC, hornbeam pollen somewhat later between 3400 and 2900 BC. With the start of the Younger Subboreal is the massive spreading of beech. The establishment of beech and hornbeam was accompanied by indicator plants for human settlements and agriculture like cereals and plantain (Plantago lanceolata), and hazel was receding.

The relatively-dry climate during the subboreal furthered the spreading of heath plants (Ericaceae).

== Sea level ==
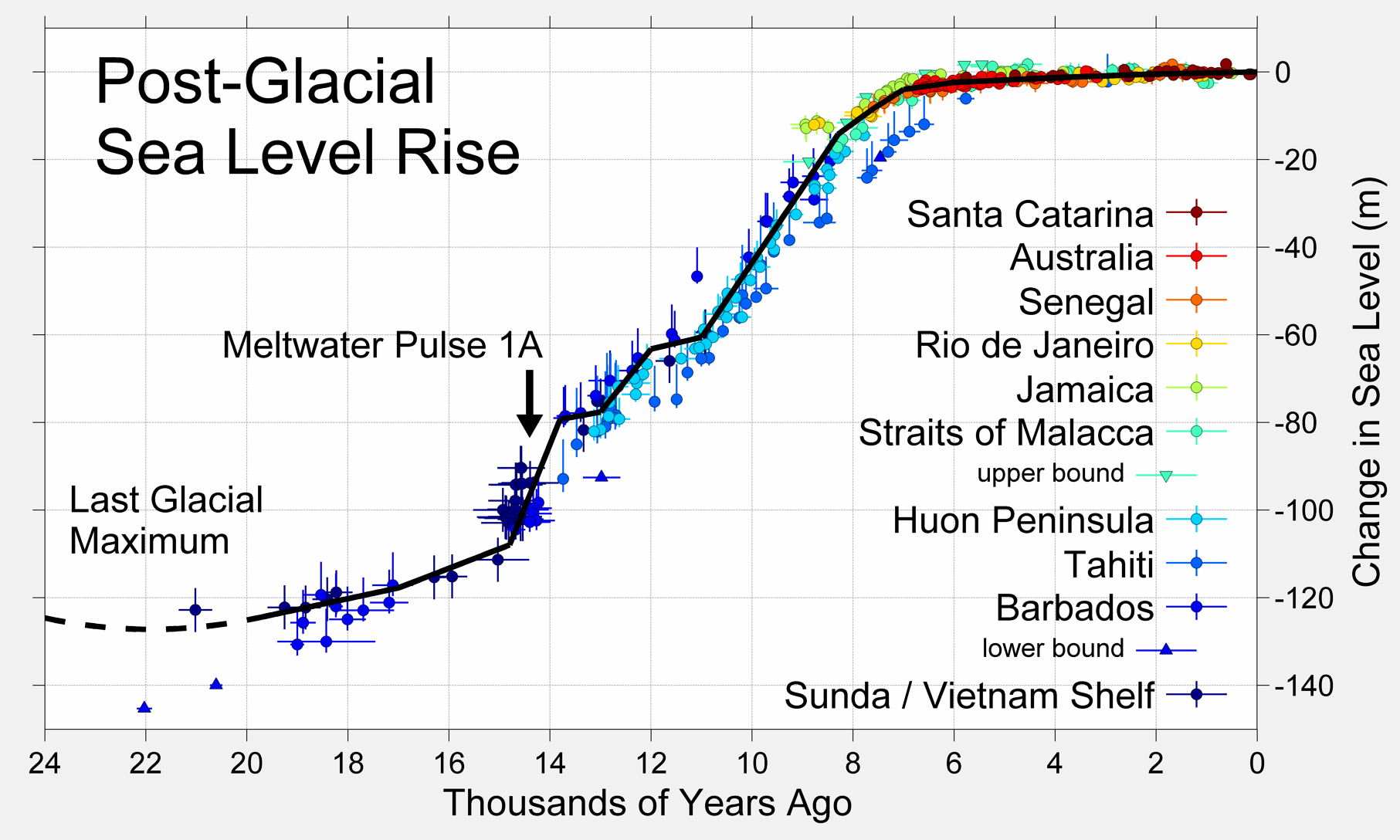
Post-glacial sea level rise

Like in the Atlantic period, the global sea level kept on rising during the Subboreal but at a much slower rate. The increase amounted to about 1 m, which corresponds to a rate of 0.3 mm per year. At the end of the Subboreal, the sea level was about 1 m below the current value.

=== Evolution in the Baltic ===
In the Baltic the Litorina Sea had already established itself before the onset of the Subboreal. During the Older Subboreal the second Litorina transgression raised the sea level to 1 m below the actual value. After an intermediate Post-litorine Regression the third Litorina transgression reached 60 cm below present and during the beginning Subatlantic, it reached today's value.

=== Evolution in the North Sea region ===
In the North Sea region, the Flandrian transgression of the Atlantic was followed by a slight regression or standstill at the beginning of the Subboreal.
