= Atlantic period =

Period of Blytt–Sernander sequence of north European climatic phase

The Atlantic in palaeoclimatology was the warmest and moistest Blytt–Sernander period, pollen zone and chronozone of Holocene northern Europe. The climate was generally warmer than today. It was preceded by the Boreal, with a climate similar to today's, and was followed by the Subboreal, a transition to the modern. Because it was the warmest period of the Holocene, the Atlantic is often referenced more directly as the Holocene climatic optimum, or just climatic optimum.

== Subdividing the Atlantic ==
The Atlantic is equivalent to pollen zone VII. Sometimes a Pre-atlantic or early Atlantic is distinguished, on the basis of an early dividing cold snap. Other scientists place the Atlantic entirely after the cold snap, assigning the latter to the Boreal. The period is still in the process of definition.

Reconstruction of temperature on the earth during the past 12,000 years.

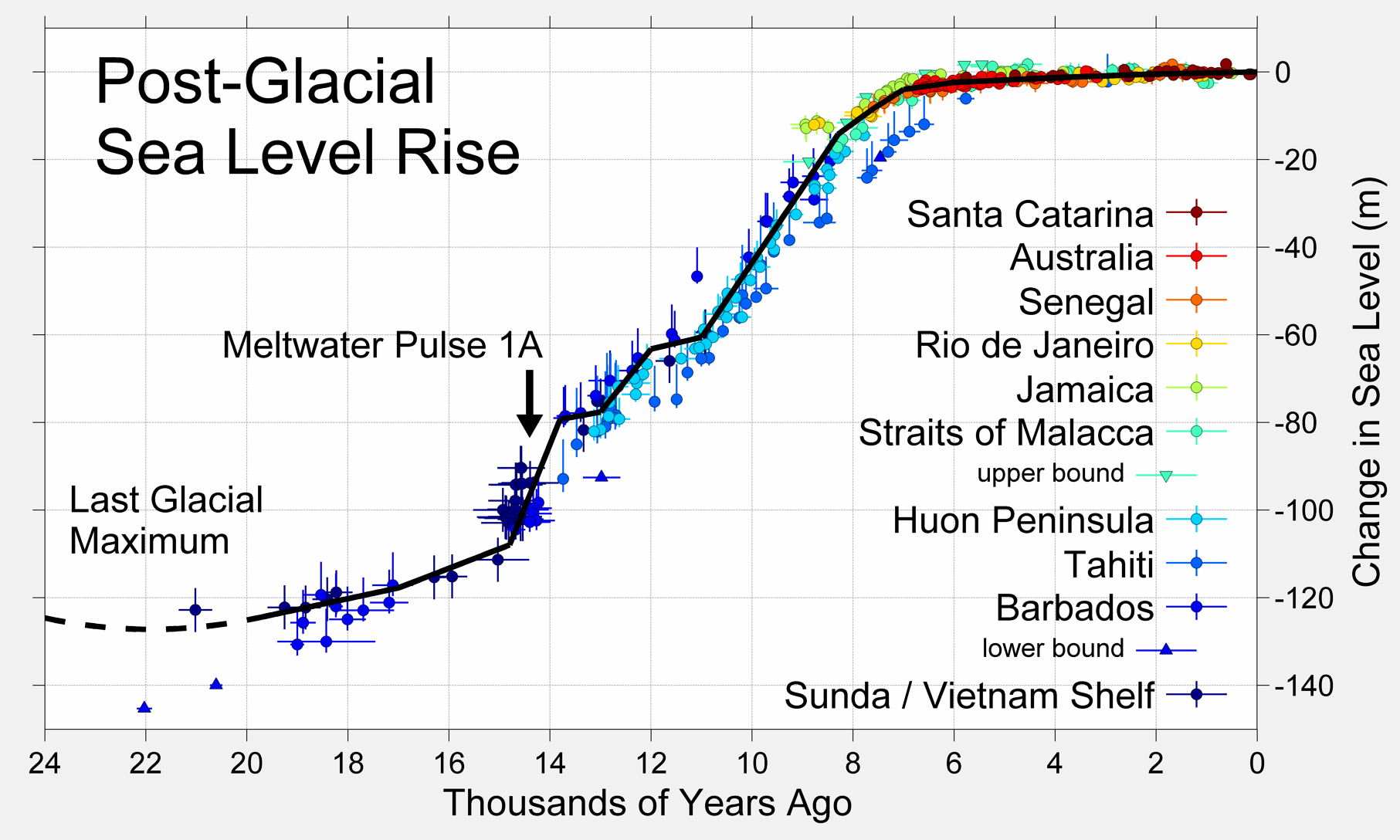
Post-Glacial Sea Level

== Dating ==
=== Beginning of the Atlantic period ===
It is a question of definition and the criteria: Beginning with the temperatures, as derivable from Greenland ice core data, it is possible to define an 'Early' or 'Pre-Atlantic' period at around 8040 BC, where the ^{18}O isotope line remains above 33 ppm in the combined curve after Rasmussen et al. (2006), which then would end at the well-known 6.2 ka BC (8.2 ka calBP)-cold-event.

Or one single Atlantic period is defined, starting at that just mentioned cold-event.

After a lake-level criterion, Kul’kova and others define the Atlantic as running from 8000 to 5000 (cal?) BP. Early Atlantic, or AT1, was a time of high lake levels, 8000–7000 BP; in Middle Atlantic, AT2, lakes were at a lower level, 7000–6500 BP; and in Late Atlantic I, 6500–6000 BP, and II, 6000–5700 BP, levels were on the rise. Each period has its distinctive ratios of species.

=== End of the Atlantic period ===
According to the ice-core criterion it is extremely difficult to find a clear boundary, because the measurements still differ too much and alignments are still under construction. Many find a decline of temperature significant enough after 4800 BC. Another criterion comes from bio-stratigraphy: the elm-decline. However, this appears in different regions between 4300 and 3100 BC.

== Description ==
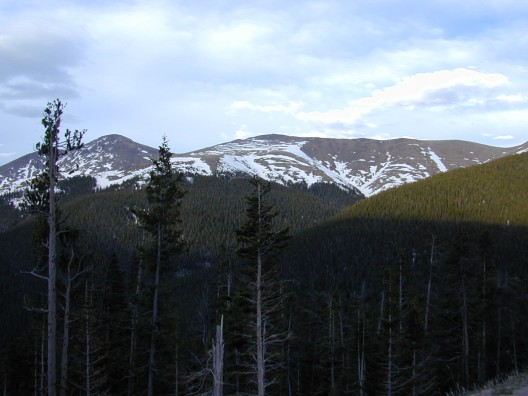
Tree line

The Atlantic was a time of rising temperature and marine transgression on the islands of Denmark and elsewhere. The sea rose to 3 m above its present level by the end of the period. The oysters found there required lower salinity. Tides of up to 1 m were present. Inland, lake levels in all north Europe were generally higher, with fluctuations.

The temperature rise had the effect of extending southern climates northward in a relatively short period. Thermophilous ("heat-loving") species migrated northward. They did not replace the species that were there, but shifted the percentages in their favor. Across middle Europe, the boreal forests were replaced by climax or "old growth" deciduous ones, which, though providing a denser canopy, were more open at the base.

The dense canopy theory, however, has been questioned by F. Vera. Oak and hazel require more light than is allowed by the dense canopy. Vera hypothesizes that the lowlands were more open and that the low frequency of grass pollen was caused by the browsing of large herbivores, such as aurochs and wild horses, a thesis referred to as the wood-pasture hypothesis.

== Flora ==
During the Atlantic period the deciduous temperate zone forests of south and central Europe extended northward to replace the boreal mixed forest, which found refugia on the mountain slopes. Mistletoe, Water Chestnut (Trapa natans) and Ivy (Hedera helix) were present in Denmark. Grass pollen decreased. Softwood forests were replaced by hardwood. Birch and pine were replaced by oak, linden (lime, both small and large leaf species), beech, oak, hazel, elm, alder, and ash, spreading to the north from further south. The period is sometimes called "the alder-elm-lime period".

In northeast Europe, the Early Atlantic forest was but slightly affected by the rise in temperature. The forest had been pine with an underbrush of hazel, alder, birch, and willow. Only about 7% of the forest became broad-leaved deciduous, dropping to Boreal levels in the cooling of the Middle Atlantic. In the warmer Late Atlantic, the broad-leaved trees became 34% of the forest.

Along the line of the Danube and the Rhine, extending northward in tributary drainage systems, a new factor entered the forest country: the Linear Pottery culture, clearing the arable land by slash and burn methods. It flourished about 5500–4500 BC, falling entirely within the Atlantic. By the end of the Atlantic, agricultural and pasture lands extended over much of Europe and the once virgin forests were contained within refugia. The end of the Atlantic is signaled by the "Elm decline", a sharp drop in Elm pollen, thought to be the result of climate, disease or human food-producing activities. In the subsequent cooler Sub-Boreal, forested country gave way to open range once more.

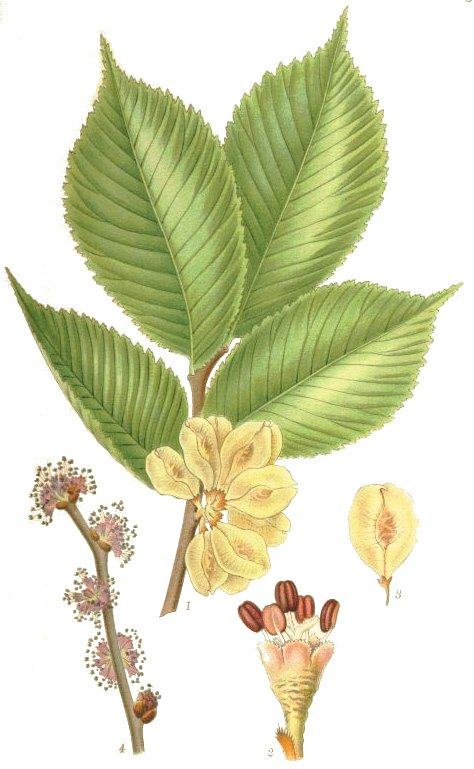
Wych elm, Ulmus glabra

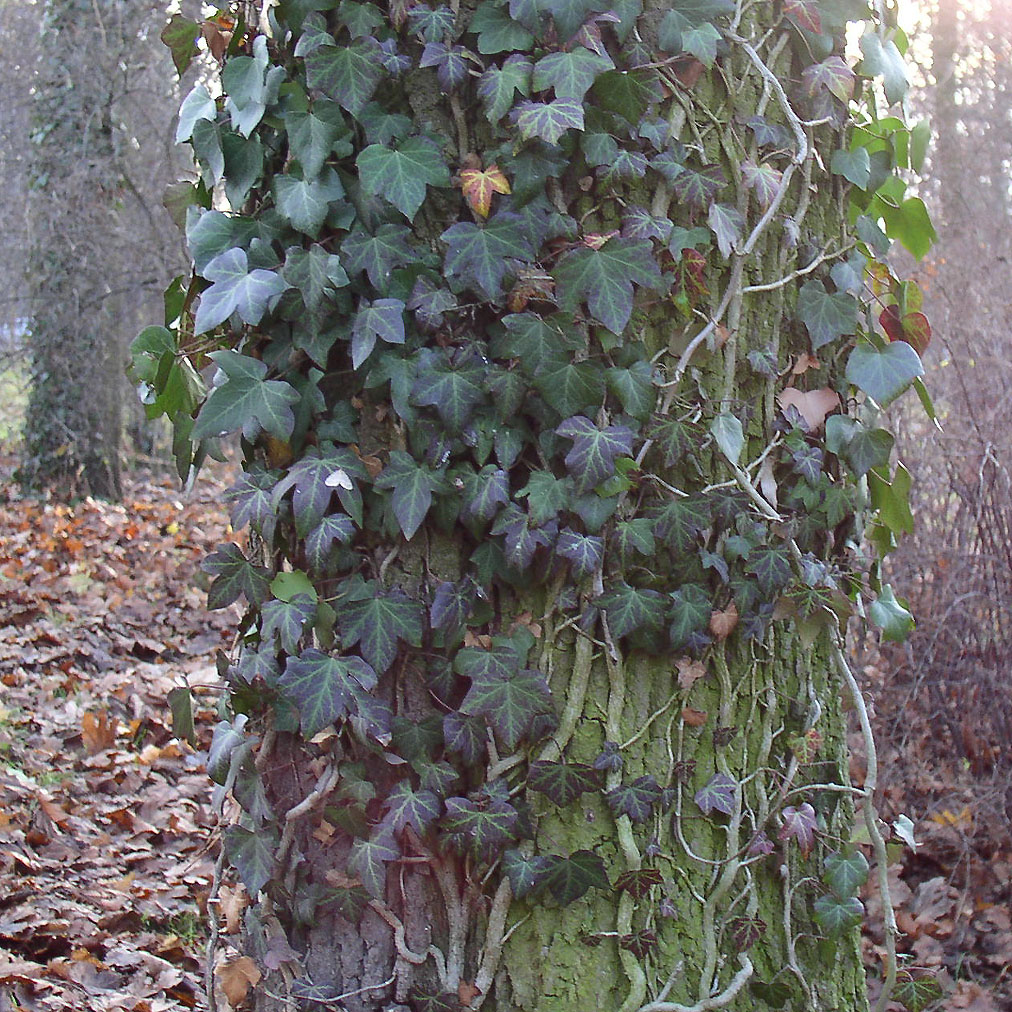
Ivy, Hedera helix

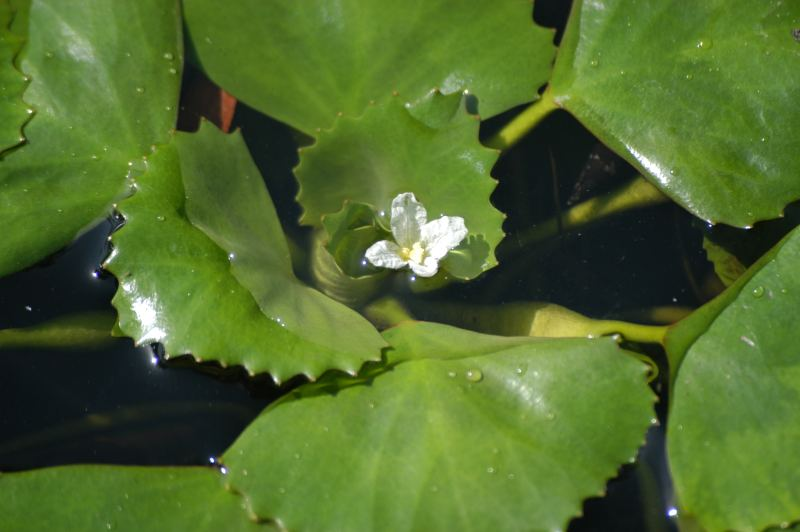
Water caltrop, Trapa natans

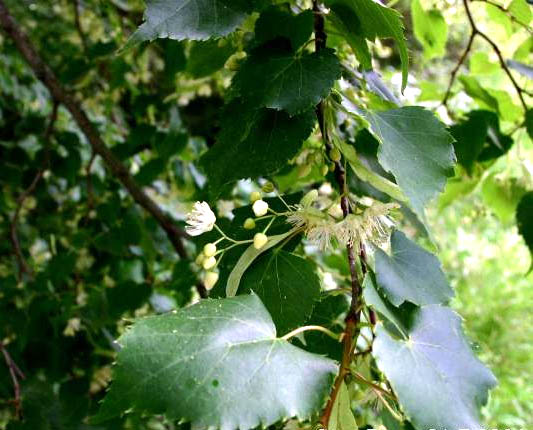
Small-leaved Linden (Lime) Tilia cordata

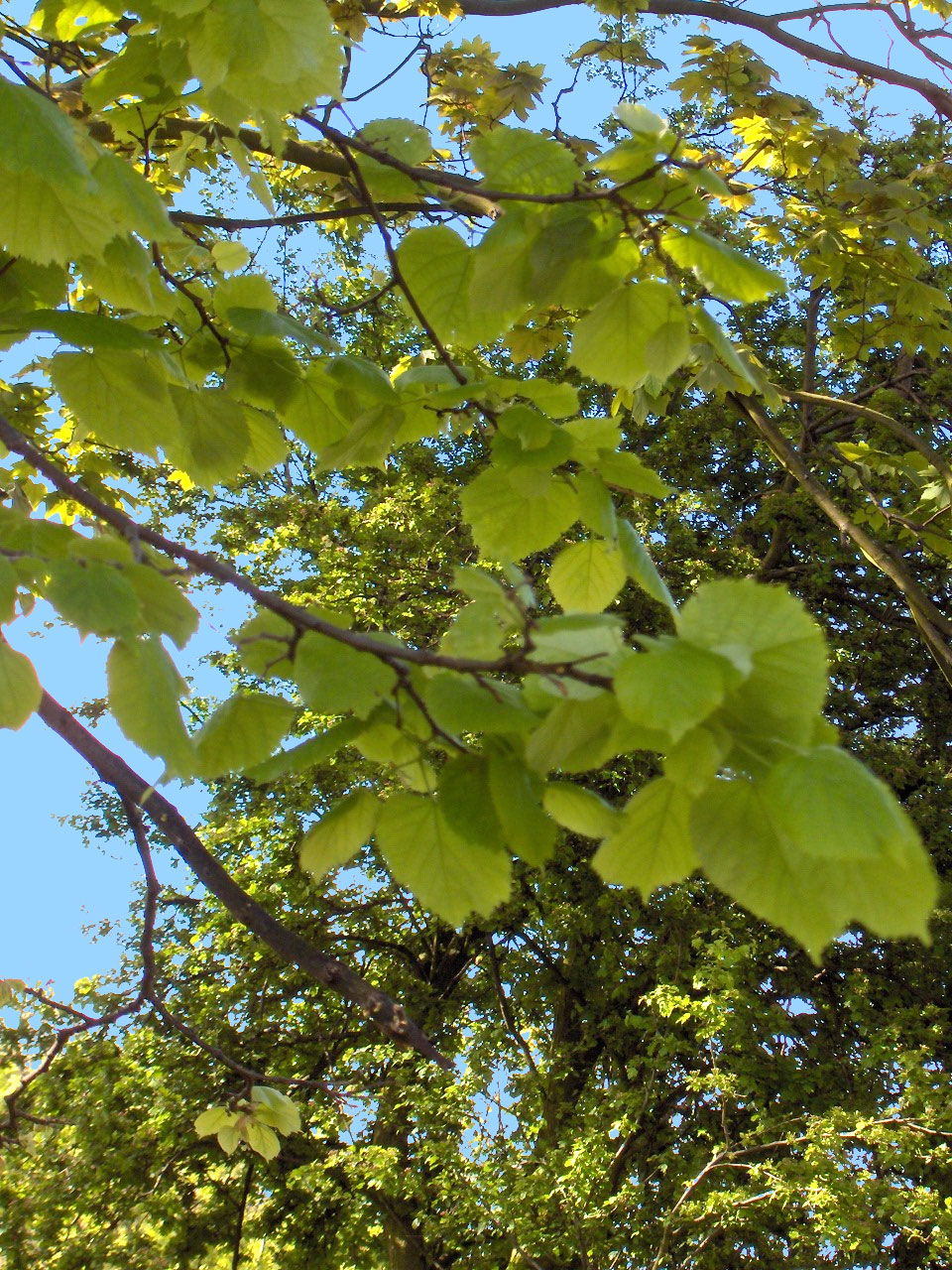
Large-leaved Linden (Lime) Tilia platyphyllos

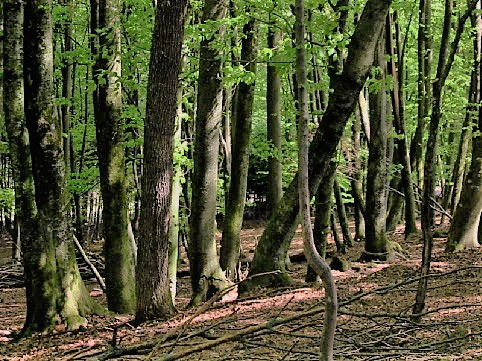
Beech forest, Slovenia

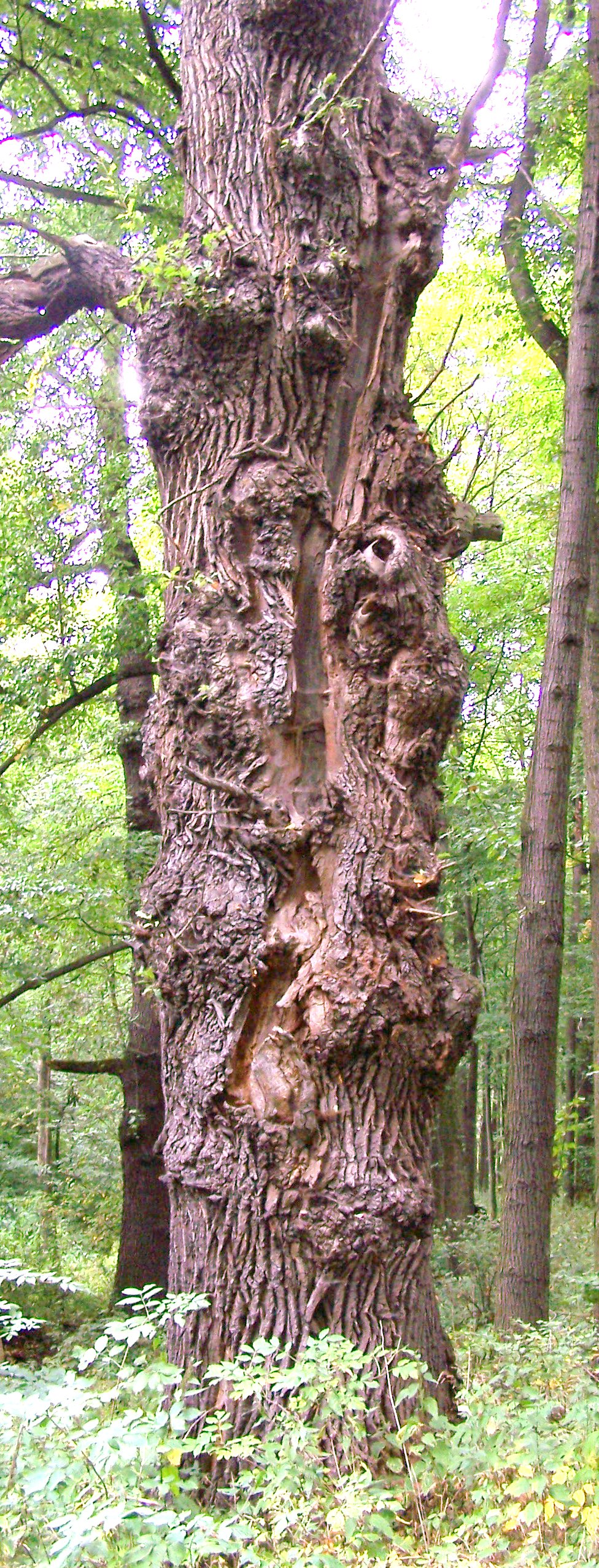
Oak scarred by lightning

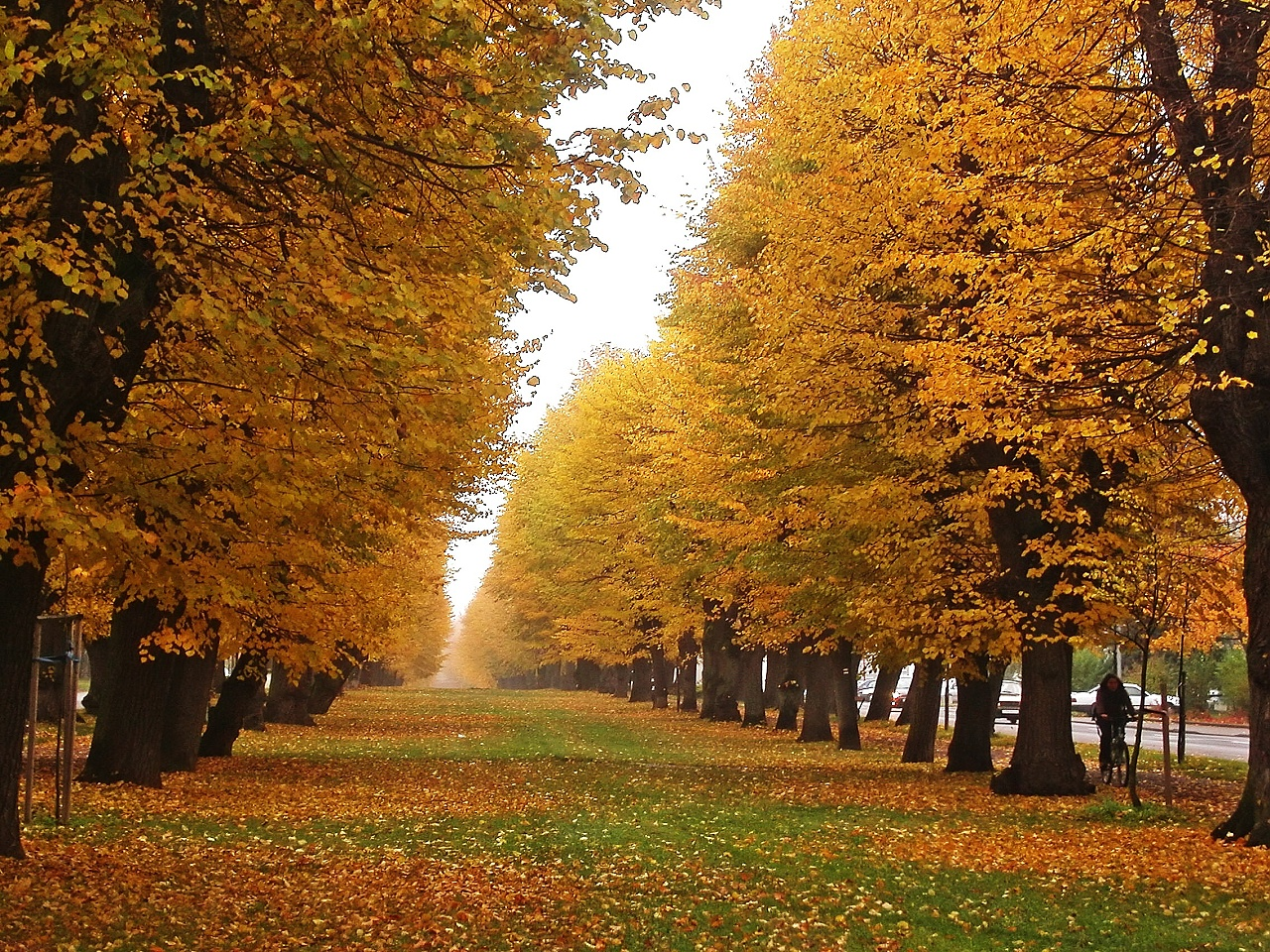
Ornamental lindens

== Fauna ==
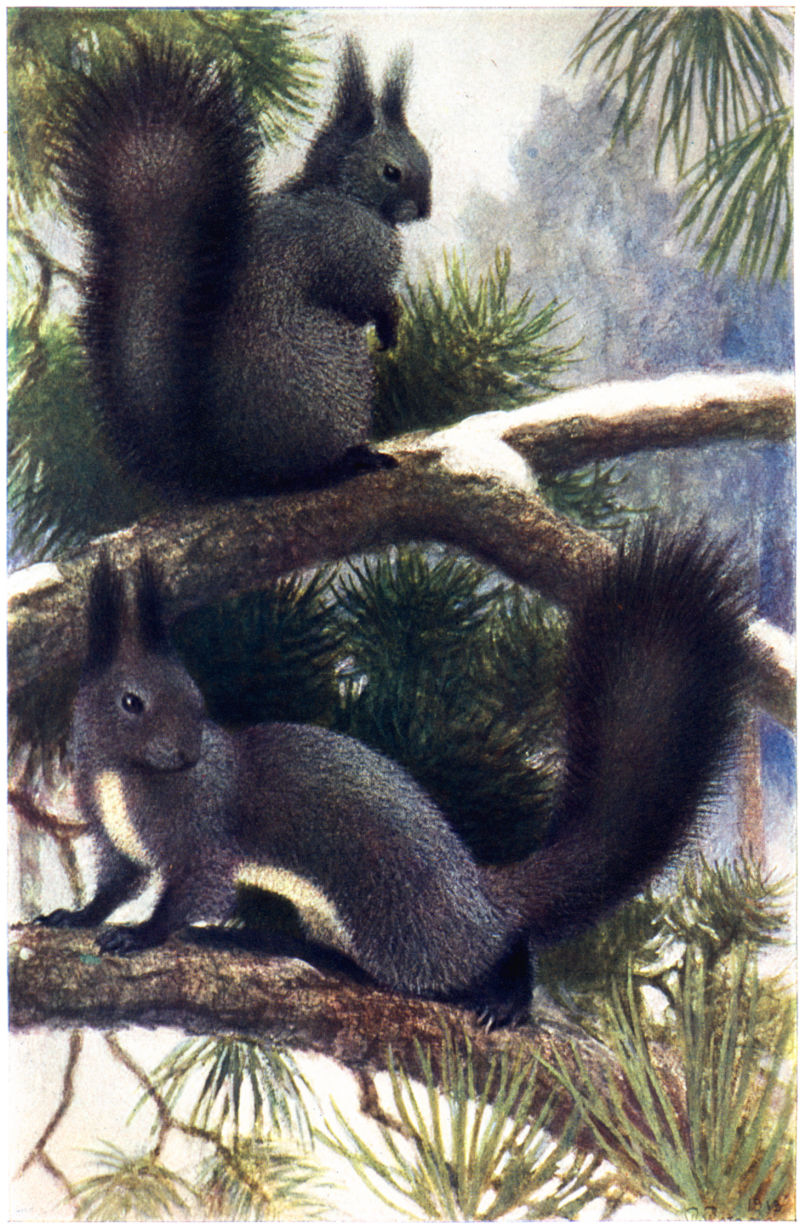
Sciurus vulgaris

The best picture of Atlantic Period fauna comes from the kitchen middens of the Ertebølle culture of Denmark and others like it. Denmark was more of an archipelago. Humans lived on the shorelines, exploiting waters rich in marine life, marshes teeming with birds, and forests where deer and boars as well as numerous small species were plentiful.

The higher water levels offset the effects of the submarine toxic zone in the Baltic Sea. It contained fish now rare there, such as the anchovy, Engraulis encrasicolus, and the three-spined stickleback, Gasterosteus aculeatus. Also available were pike, whitefish, cod, and ling. Three kinds of seals were found there, the ringed, harp and grey. Mesolithic man hunted them and whales in the estuaries.

The main birds were maritime: the red-throated diver, the black-throated diver, and the gannet. The Dalmatian pelican (Pelecanus crispus), which is now found only as far north as south-eastern Europe, has been found in Denmark. The capercaillie, as is the case now, was found in forested areas.

In the lofty canopy could be found a continuous zone of smaller animals, such as the ubiquitous squirrel (Sciuris vulgaris). Daubenton's bat (Myotis daubentonii) was common. In and around the big trees hunted the wildcat, pine marten, polecat (Mustela putorius), and wolf.

The forest floor was prolific with larger browsers and rooters such as the red deer, roe deer, and wild boar. Not all the former plains mammals had abandoned the country. They remained in the open forest and meadows. These include the aurochs, ancestor of cattle, and the wild horse which, as a discovery, was something of a revelation. The horses were not entirely hunted out, were not confined to the plains further east, and were not entirely the property of the Indo-European cultures there. The Mesolithic Ertebølle people were hunting them in Denmark.

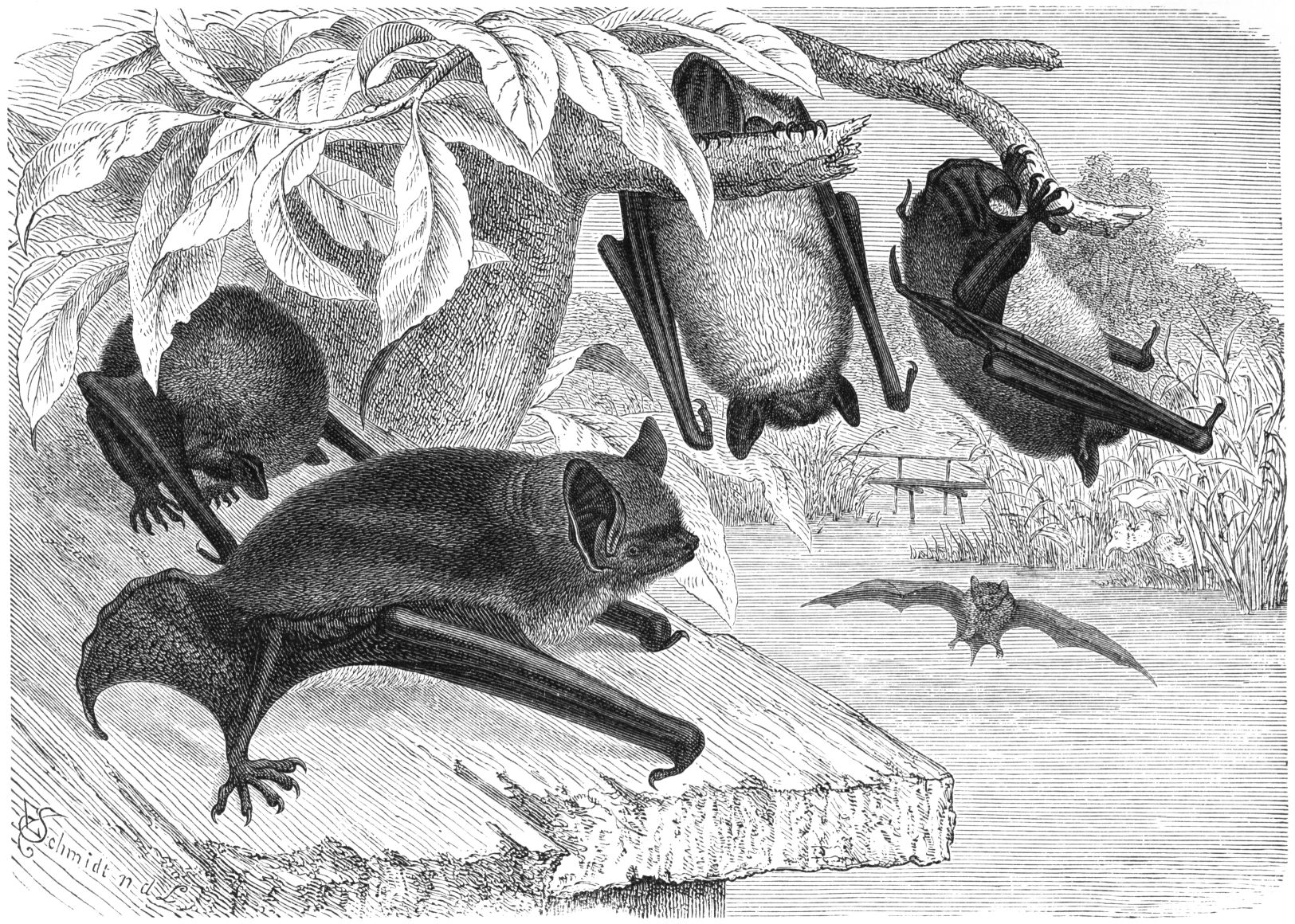
Daubenton's bat

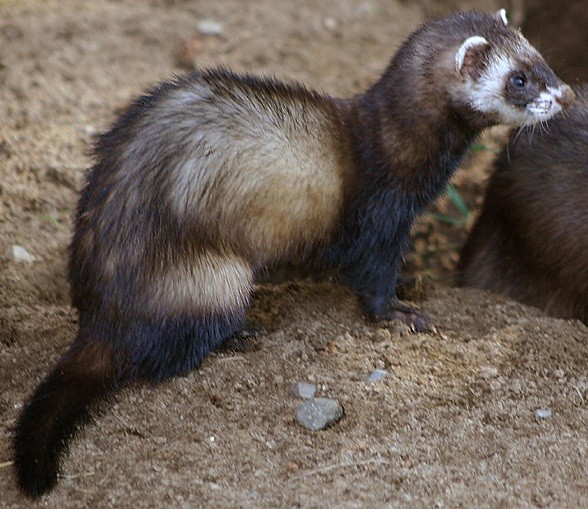
Mustela putorius (Common polecat)

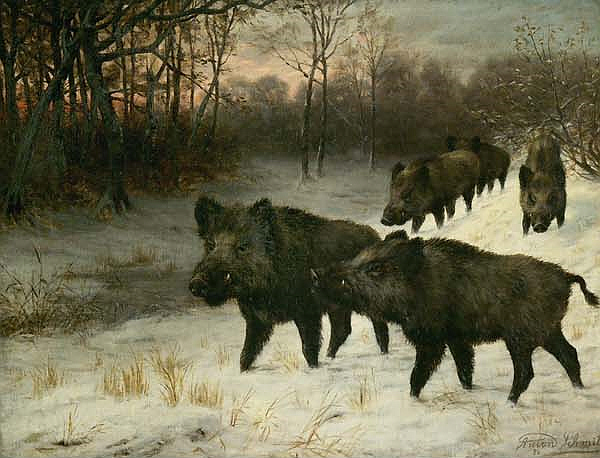
Wild boar, by Anton Schmitz

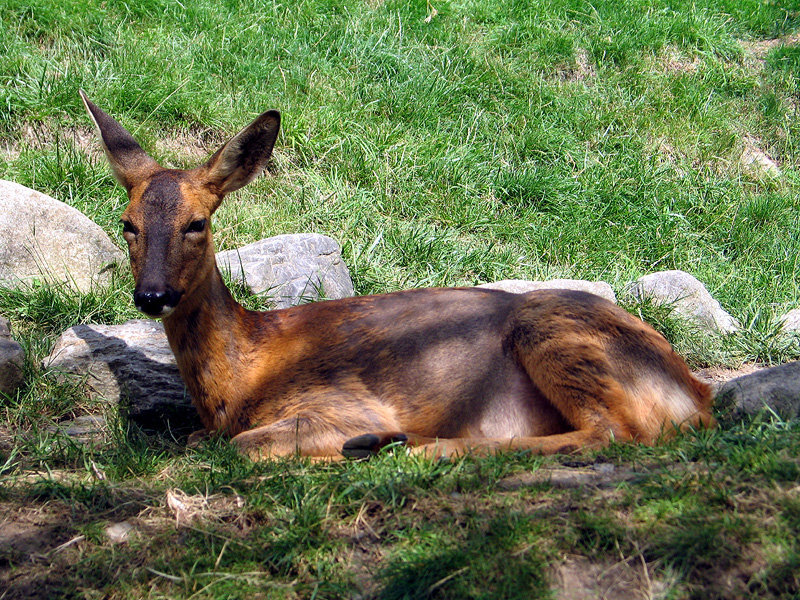
Roe deer

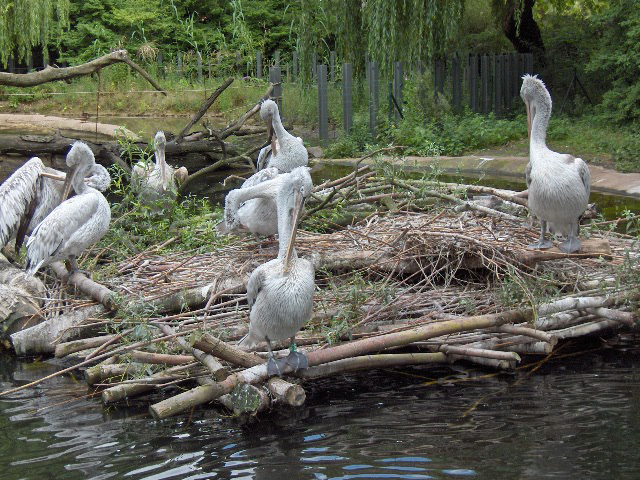
Pelecanus crispus

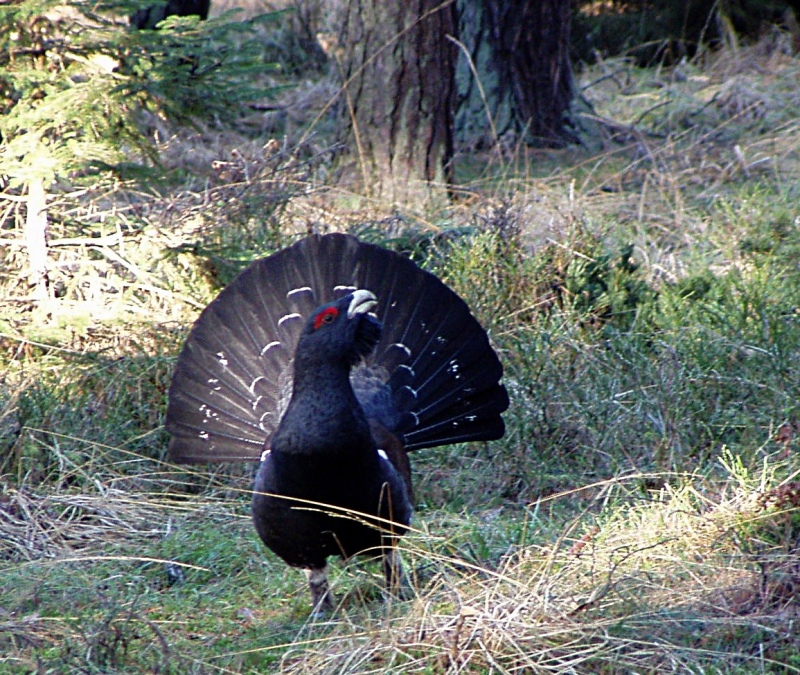
Capercaillie

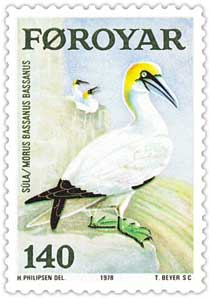
Gannet

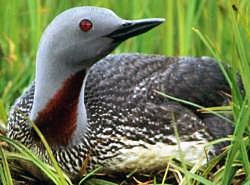
Red-throated diver

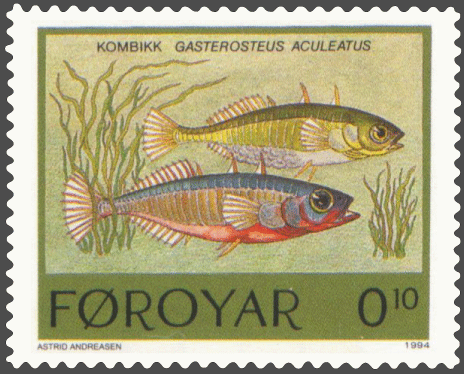
Gasterosteus aculeatus

== Human cultures ==
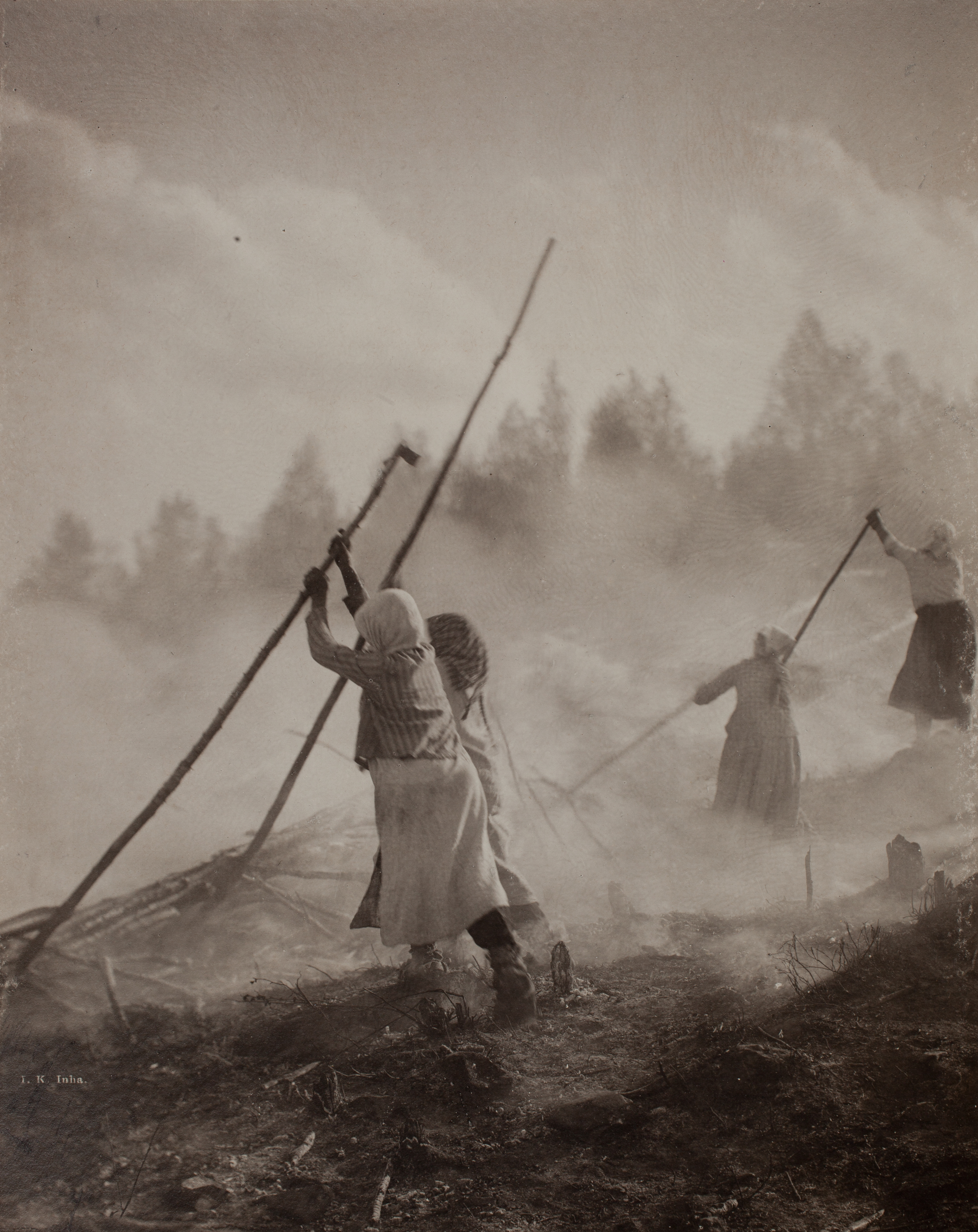
Slashing and burning

Human cultures of Northern Europe were primarily Mesolithic. The Kongemose culture (6400–5400 BC) settled on the coastline and lake margins of Denmark. Late in the Atlantic, Kongemose culture settlements were abandoned because of the rising water of the Littorina Sea; and the succeeding Ertebølle culture (5400–3900 BC) settled more densely on the new shorelines.

Northeastern Europe was uninhabited in the Early Atlantic. When the Mesolithic Sertuan Culture appeared there in the Middle Atlantic, around 7000 BP, it already had pottery and was more sedentary than earlier hunter-gatherers, depending on the great abundance of wildlife. Pottery was being used around the lower Don and Volga from about 8000 BP.

In the Late Atlantic, Sertuan culture evolved into Rudnya culture, which used pottery like that of the Narva and Dnieper-Donets cultures. That use of pottery upsets the idea that pottery belongs to the Neolithic. Further to the south, the Linear Pottery culture had already spread into the riverlands of Central Europe and was working a great transformation of the land. On the steppe to the east, the Samara culture was deeply involved with large numbers of horses, but it is not yet clear in what capacity.

== See also ==
- Mediterranean Basin

== Bibliography ==
- Kertész, Róbert (2002). "Mesolithic Hunter-Gatherers in the Northwestern Part of the Great Hungarian Plain" (PDF). Praehistoria. 3. Archived from the original (PDF) on 27 September 2007.
- Kul'kova, M.A.; Mazurkevich, A.N.; Dolukhanov, P.M. (2001). "Chronology and Palaeoclimate of Prehistoric Sites in Western Dvina-Lovat' Area of North-western Russia" (PDF). Geochronometria. 20: 87–94.
- Peterken, George Frederick (1993). Woodland Conservation and Management. Springer. pp. 8–9. ISBN 0-412-55730-4.
- Schrøder, N.; Pedersen, L. Højlund; Bitsch, R. Juel (2004). "10,000 Years of Climate Change and Human Impact on the Environment in the Area Surrounding Lejre" (PDF). The Journal of Transdisciplinary Environmental Studies. 3 (1). (Download)
