= Tandernaken =

Early modern popular Dutch song

"Tandernaken, al op den Rijn"

Song
- Published: 1430s
- Genre: Middle Dutch

Tandernaken, al op den Rijn (also spelled: T'Andernaken, al op den Rijn) was once a very popular Middle Dutch song about two girls who in Andernach, a city in Germany on the left Rhine bank, were spied on by the lover of one of the girls, who was listening to their conversation on love affairs from a distance.

== History ==
The tune of the song survived in monophonic and in polyphonic sources, but the text of the secular song is only known through textual sources. Tandernaken was popular in the period between about 1430 and the 1540s as settings, preserved in Dutch, Italian, German and English sources, are listed by Franco-Flemish (or Dutch), German and English composers such as Jacob Obrecht, Antoine Brumel, King Henry VIII, Alexander Agricola, Paul Hofhaimer, Petrus Alamire, Ludwig Senfl and Erasmus Lapicida.

The earliest extant setting of the Tandernaken tune is by Tijling, a composer of whom, besides this composition, nothing else is known. His composition is included in one of the so-called Trent Codices (c. 1433–1445). The tenor voice has the features of the polyphonic tenores of the Dutch and French song settings from the first half of the 15th century. These same features are found in a number of tunes which were notated with lines instead of notes on a stave (which is for instance the case in the Gruuthuse manuscript). These versions have all in common that the text has been noted separately from the tune or the tenor.

The earliest polyphonic settings of Tandernaken are registered in Dutch or Italian sources and were by Franco-Flemish or Dutch composers. The most recent sources and compositions are found in Germany. Probably, the tune became first popular in Italy before it entering Germany by way of Italian instrumental ensembles.

Most of the polyphonic settings do not give the text to the tune. Where there is a text, the text is a spiritual contrafactum. These 'monophonic' sources which do not provide any musical notation include also secular contrafacta. Although the text extant in the Antwerp songbook can be sung without too much difficulty by the tenor voice in the oldest settings such as these by Tijling and Obrecht, and although the tune of the extant non-polyphonic versions is related to but quite different from the tenor of the polyphonic versions, most of the polyphonic compositions can be regarded as instrumental settings.

An indication of the instruments with which the non-texted polyphonic versions of Tandernaken could be played, is provided by a manuscript made for the players of wind instruments at the court of Albert of Prussia, in which the word Krumbhörner, crumhorns, is mentioned in the bass voice. A setting by Hofhaimer was notated for three voices in tablature for organ. A si-placet-altus in mensural notation was added to the tablature of Hans Kotter, with the comment von einandern darzu zuschlagen, to be performed by another player separately.

The first verse of Tandernaken is included in a Dutch quodlibet (for the text look for Quodlibet on the Dutch Wikipedia).

== Middle Dutch text ==
The complete text of the song is preserved in the Antwerp songbook. Other versions are less complete.

Tandernaken, al op den Rijn

1.
Tandernaken, al op den Rijn,
daer vant ic twee maechdekens spelen gaen;
die eene dochte mi, aen haer aenschyn,
haer ooghen waren met tranen ombevaen:
'nu segt mi, lieve ghespele goet,
hoe sweert u herte, hoe truert uwen moet,
waer om ist, dat woudys mi maken vroet?'
-'Ic en cans u niet gesagen;
tis die moeder diet mi doet,
si wil mijn boel veriagen, veriagen.'
1.
In Andernach on the Rhine
I saw two girls amusing themselves.
One of them pleased me with her appearance.
Her eyes were full of tears.
"Now tell me, dear girlfriend,
why laments your heart, why is your spirit so pained,
why is that, can you explain it to me?"
"I can't tell you ...
It is my mother who has done this to me.
She wants to chase off my sweetheart."
2.
-'Och lieve ghespele, daer en leyt niet an,
den mey die sal noch bloeyen;
so wie zijn liefken niet spreken en can,
die minne mach hem niet vermoeyen.'
-'Och, lieve ghespeelken, dats quaet sanck,
den mey te verbeyden valt mi te lanc;
het soude mi maken van sinnen also cranc,
ic soude van rouwe sterven.
Ic en weets mijnder moeder geenen danc,
si wil mijn boel verderven, verderven.'
3.
- 'Och, lieve ghespele, daer en leyt niet an,
nu schict u herteken al in vreden.'
- 'Mijn moeder plach te spinnen, des en doet si niet,
den tijt en is niet lange gheleden;
nu schelt si mi hier, nu vloect si mi daer,
mijn boelken en dorf niet comen naer,
daer om is mijn herteken dus swaer;
ist wonder dat ic truere?
ende ic en mach niet gaen van haer,
ter veynster, noch ter duere, noch ter duere.'
4.
- 'Och, lieve ghespele, dat waer wel quaet,
wilt sulker tale begheven,
hadde ic ghedaen mijns moeders raet,
ic waer wel maecht ghebleven.
Nu hebbe ic sinen wille ghedaen,
mijn buycxken is mi opghegaen,
ende nu so is hi mi ontgaen
ende gaet elwaerts spelen.
Des moet ic laten so menighen traen,
ic en cans u niet gehelen, gehelen.'
5.
- 'Ghespele, wel lieve ghespele goet,
en sidy dan gheen maecht?'
- 'Och neen ic, lieve ghespele goet,
ende dat si ons heer God gheclaecht.'
- 'God danck, dat ic noch maghet si;
spiegelt u, lieve gespeelken, aen mi
ende wacht u, oft ghi en zijt niet vrij,
ten sal u niet berouwen;
coemt hem nemmermeer niet na bi
oft ghi wort gheloont met trouwen, met trouwen.'
6.
- 'Ghespele, hi seyt dat hi mi mint.'
- 'Dis minne plach mi te lieghen;
en ghelooft die clappaerts niet en twint,
si staen al na bedrieghen.'
Doen loech si nen groten schach;
dat was die maghet die op mi sach.
Ic boot haer minnelic goeden dach,
ic groetese hoghelike.
God gheve dat icse vinden mach
bi mi, in hemelrijcke, in hemelrijcke!
