= Alois Spaniol =

Nazi German leader in the Saar

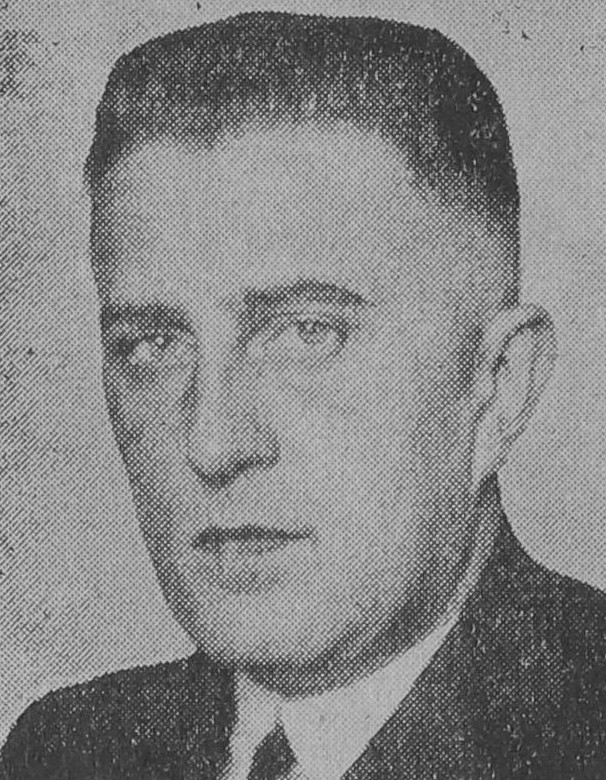
- Spaniol, c. 1934

Landesführer, Saar
- In office 14 June 1933 – 26 February 1934
- Preceded by: Position created
- Succeeded by: Position abolished

Leader, Deutsche Front
- In office 14 July 1933 – 26 February 1934
- Preceded by: Position created
- Succeeded by: Jakob Pirro

Bürgermeister of Andernach
- In office 1 April 1935 – 8 March 1945

Personal details
- Born: 19 September 1904 Lisdorf, Rhine Province, Kingdom of Prussia, German Empire
- Died: January 1959 (aged 54) Ettlingen, Baden-Württemberg, West Germany
- Party: Nazi Party

Alois Spaniol (19 September 1904 – January 1959) was a leader of the Nazi Party in the Saar and Bürgermeister of Andernach in Nazi Germany.

== Early life ==
Spaniol was born in Lisdorf (today, part of Saarlouis) the son of a schoolteacher. He attended Volksschule and the Saarlouis Gymnasium until 1921, earning his Abitur. He then entered the teacher training college in Merzig, dropping out after three years. He worked in various unskilled jobs for the next seven years until becoming unemployed in 1931 during the Great Depression. By the terms of the Treaty of Versailles, the Territory of the Saar Basin had been taken from Germany and administered by a joint French-British Governing Council under a League of Nations mandate. Spaniol's political career began in 1923 when he became active in nationalist Völkisch circles dedicated to restoring the Saar to Germany.

== Nazi Party career ==
Spaniol joined the Nazi Party (NSDAP) on 1 May 1931 (membership number 519,608) and by July became the Ortsgruppenleiter (Local Group Leader) in Lisdorf. He also enrolled in the Sturmabteilung (SA), the Party's paramilitary organization, and rose from SA-Scharführer to SA-Truppführer of the SA Sturm in Saarlouis with over one hundred members. In October 1932 he advanced to Kreisleiter (County Leader) in Saarlouis-Merzig. In December 1932, he was made Deputy Gauleiter for the Saar.

On 6 May 1933, Josef Bürckel, the Nazi Party Gauleiter of the Rheinpfalz, also formally replaced Karl Brück as Gauleiter of the Saar. However, the Saar Governing Council refused to acknowledge his authority, ruling that a resident of Germany was not allowed to represent the Party in the Saar. On 14 June 1933, Spaniol took charge in Bürckel's place with the title of Landesführer der NSDAP im Saargebiet (State Leader of the NSDAP in the Saar Area). Shortly afterward, the Deutsche Front (German Front) was formed as an umbrella organization of the Nazis and other right-wing and middle-class nationalist parties (including the Catholic Centre Party) to campaign for the return of the Saar to Germany. On 14 July 1933, Spaniol became its first leader and also was appointed to the newly reconstituted Prussian State Council by Prussian Minister President Hermann Göring. However, he soon found himself in conflict with Bürckel who was still directing the Party's Saar policy from Germany. On 26 February 1934, Spaniol was ousted by Bürckel who replaced him with Jakob Pirro as leader of the Deutsche Front. Bürckel also sought a Party expulsion procedure against Spaniol but this was unsuccessful.

Losing out in the power struggle with Bürckel, Spaniol was recalled from the Saar and given a position as Saar consultant in the Reich Economics Ministry in Berlin as of 1 March 1934. After the Saar plebiscite restored the Saar to Germany (effective 1 March 1935) Spaniol was appointed Bürgermeister of Andernach in the Rhine Province on 1 April 1935, retaining this office until 8 March 1945 when the city was liberated. From 1936 he also worked as a Reichsredner (Reich orator).

During the Second World War, Spaniol performed military service with the Wehrmacht from March 1942 and was mainly deployed with a propaganda company on the eastern front. After the end of the war, he was held in the British internment camp in Recklinghausen from 1946 to 1948. After his release, he lived in Ettlingen and worked as a commercial clerk in the timber industry.

Spaniol's date of death was researched by historian Gerhard Paul and, according to "information from the personnel department of the city administration of Andernach," it was established as January 1959.

== Sources ==
- Alois Spaniol entry in the Saarland Biographien
- Lilla, Joachim (2005). Der Preußische Staatsrat 1921–1933: Ein biographisches Handbuch. Düsseldorf: Droste Verlag. ISBN 978-3-770-05271-4.
- Miller, Michael D.; Schulz, Andreas (2012). Gauleiter: The Regional Leaders of the Nazi Party and Their Deputies, 1925–1945. Vol. 1 (Herbert Albrecht - H. Wilhelm Hüttmann). R. James Bender Publishing. ISBN 978-1-932-97021-0.
- Paul, Gerhard (1987). Die NSDAP des Saargebietes: 1920-1935. Saarbrücker Druckerei und Verlag. ISBN 978-3-925-03611-8.
- Zentner, Christian; Bedürftig, Friedemann, eds. (1997) [1991]. The Encyclopedia of the Third Reich. New York: Da Capo Press. ISBN 978-0-306-80793-0.
