= Wallender Born =

Cold water geyser in Germany

Coordinates: 50°09′13″N 6°43′13″E

The Wallender Born or Wallenborn (popularly known as the Brubbel) is a cold water geyser in the village Wallenborn (Eifel district, Germany). It is adjacent to the reactivated Andernach Geyser (aka Namedyer Sprudel) an active cold water geyser in Germany.

The Wallender Born coldwater geyser

Experts disagree on whether the Wallender Born can be described as eruptive course, but periodic gas outbreaks have been witnessed since time immemorial. Until being drilled, Wallender Born was therefore at least a (periodic) mofette. The high water surge of a typical hot spring was found only after construction work. The fountain is operated geyser-like: The artificial conduit is located below the water surface of a small pond. The water is therefore not thrown like a fountain, but turbulent. The "fuel gas" of the geyser is carbon dioxide. It contains traces of other gases like hydrogen sulfide which leads to a smell reminiscent of rotten eggs.

== Interval between eruptions ==
The eruptions of the Wallender Born occur roughly every 35 minutes. An eruption lasts about 5 minutes and is divided into another two clearly distinguishable phases: The first of these two phases will take about 10 seconds, the water from the vent, and possibly underground existing reservoirs, depending on groundwater level and air pressure results in a 2–4 m high water column (maximum) being ejected. In the second phase, which takes about 5 minutes, the surge varies greatly. The second phase is the quiet phase during which the water slowly sinks back into the vent.

The violence of the eruption and the height of the water column varies slightly between outbreaks.

== Geology ==
Wallender Born is the result of volcanic activity seen in the Eifel region, although the shape of the eruptive source is not a direct consequence of geothermal energy, but of the escape of carbon dioxide. From the magma in the crust volcanic gas rises through cracks and fissures in the earth's surface and dissolves partly in the ground water to carbonic acid. The source is a calcium-sodium-bicarbonate-sorrel. The spring water is very cloudy with sediment.
