= Wallenborn =

- Municipality
- Coat of arms

- Location of Wallenborn within Vulkaneifel district
- Interactive map of Wallenborn
- Location within Germany Location within Rhineland-Palatinate
- Coordinates: 50°09′22″N 6°43′20″E
- Country: Germany
- State: Rhineland-Palatinate
- District: Vulkaneifel
- Municipal assoc.: Daun

Government
  - Mayor (2019–24): Günter Mehles

Area
  - Total: 8.32 km^{2} (3.21 sq mi)
- Elevation: 425 m (1,394 ft)

Population (2025-12-31)
  - Total: 411
  - Density: 49.4/km^{2} (128/sq mi)
- Time zone: UTC+01:00 (CET)
  - Summer (DST): UTC+02:00 (CEST)
- Postal codes: 54570
- Dialling codes: 06599
- Vehicle registration: DAU
- Website: www.wallenborn-eifel.de

Wallenborn is an Ortsgemeinde – a municipality belonging to a Verbandsgemeinde, a kind of collective municipality – in the Vulkaneifel district in Rhineland-Palatinate, Germany. It belongs to the Verbandsgemeinde of Daun, whose seat is in the like-named town. The municipality is a state-recognized tourism community (Fremdenverkehrsgemeinde).

== Geography ==
The municipality lies in the Vulkaneifel, a part of the Eifel known for its volcanic history, geographical and geological features, and even ongoing activity today, including gases that sometimes well up from the earth. Indeed, Wallenborn is named after one of the region's phenomena, found right in the village (see Natural monuments below).

Wallenborn lies roughly 10 km (6 mi) as the crow flies or 12 km (7 mi) by road southwest of Daun on Bundesstraße 257.

== History ==
On 20 July 1225, Wallenborn had its first documentary mention. Gerhard Lord of Blankenheim reached a compromise with Himmerod Abbey for a recently donated piece of land near Niederstadtfeld and Wallenborn (Walleburne), on the road between Hundswinkel and Salm. An ecclesiastical complex was first on hand in the village in 1354. Ten years later, Henne von Winneburg (Winneburg being a knightly family) held an estate at Wallenborn as a Casselburg castle fief. In 1491, Gerlach von Winneburg was enfeoffed with several Blankenheim holdings, among them the estate at Wallenborn. In 1515, the Von Zandt family had 14 subjects in the village, and the Kerpen family 3. In 1526, Johann von Winneburg was enfeoffed with the estate at Wallenborn. Only seven years later, Philipp Haust von Ulmen was granted the same fief by Count Gerhard von Blankenheim-Manderscheid. In 1559, Count Hans-Gerhard enfeoffed Hugo Zandt Voit in Hamm (Voit = Vogt) with, among other things, an estate in Wallenborn. In 1593, Johann Zandt was enfeoffed with the Wallenborn estate. In 1611 he was enfeoffed with it yet again by Count Karl. In 1614, Karl von Manderscheid-Gerolstein was Lord of Wallenborn. In 1664, Karl Ludwig von Zandt was enfeoffed with the Wallenborn estate, as were his descendants in 1711, 1732 and 1783. In 1680 and 1681, a lordly agreement was recorded at Wallenborn that still exists today. In 1681, Wallenborn belonged to the House of Arenberg. Of all fines, Zandt received two thirds, while the other third went to Kerpen, until 1794. In 1687, the villagers requested church services at their chapel.

On 6 February 1705 there was a great fire in the village. The church books were all burnt. Whether the chapel consecrated to Saint Sebastian remained unscathed is unknown. In 1713, however, the rectory and the chapel were both said to be in good condition.

Beginning in 1715, and lasting until about 1805, there was a chaplaincy in Wallenborn. The chaplain, or vicar, performed baptisms, weddings and funerals just like a parish priest and he kept the church books, just as a priest would in a full-fledged parish. It is also known that by 1715, Wallenborn had its own graveyard at the chapel, but probably had had it by then for as long as anyone could remember. In 1894, it was expanded.

In 1719, the vicar began school instruction. In 1720, Wilhelm Dietrich, Baron of Ahr, was Lord of Wallenborn. In 1777, the vicar received for his services, including as teacher, 24 Thaler and fruit delivery from the municipality. In 1778, Wallenborn belonged to the Duchy of Arenberg, whose head, Duke Ludwig Engelbert, was later blinded as the result of a shooting accident. Wallenborn was then administered by Baron von Zandt zu Merl.

In 1786, the von Zandt subjects at Wallenborn complained to the Kerpen financial office about financial penalties. In 1794, Wallenborn was in the Electoral-Trier Amt of Manderscheid and belonged to the Duke of Arenberg and the Baron of Zandt jointly.

In 1802, during the time of French rule, Wallenborn, which had been in the parish of Sarresdorf in the Diocese of Cologne, was grouped into the parish of Salm, as were Michelbach, Büscheich and Niedereich. In 1812, a Heiligenhäuschen (a small, shrinelike structure consecrated to a saint or saints) was built with a stone relief of the Fourteen Holy Helpers. In 1814 a new chapel was built.

In 1819, a municipal assessment yielded the facts that Wallenborn had 1,114 head of cattle and 42 residents with entitlement. From 1825 to 1827, Wallenborn dwellers saw their money going to the Bishop in Trier. In 1825, a petition, with every villager's signature, was presented bearing the wish von Salm loszukommen (“to come loose from Salm”, that is, to separate from the parish). In 1826, the local landowners tried, unsuccessfully, to claim the municipal woodlands as their own.

In 1830, Jakob Kraemer from Gromes was the schoolteacher. He earned 80 Thaler and was said to be adequately competent. In 1848, there was another great fire in the village.

An 1854 edition of Eiflia Illustrata listed 8 springs in Wallenborn, known as Brubbeldreis; they are sulphur-bearing and deadly to insects.

By 1864, Wallenborn had a new rectory. A collection undertaken with Bishop Wilhelm's approval for this purpose yielded 750 Thaler. “With 8 rooms it is not a modern house, but it has comfortable spaces.” In 1868, families in Wallenborn were given money from a donation from a fire insurance institution to grow seed grain and seed potato. In 1869 Clemens Ringer from Montabaur was the schoolteacher. He earned 135 Thaler and the Pastor was said to be satisfied with him.

On 21 June 1873, Franz Bender, a 26-year-old farmworker, emigrated to Ohio to live with relatives who were already there. By 1876, however, it would seem that he had come back, for he was by now the Ortsvorsteher, the village's head, and Ringer was still the schoolteacher.

In 1880 came misfortune. A persistent scarlet fever and diphtheria epidemic struck Wallenborn. That same year, 17-year-old Matthias Pflüger was denied leave to travel away from the village on the grounds that he was trying to avoid service in the army.

In 1893, a mining concession was granted for Wallenborn, among other places, approving the mining of coal. That same year, there was trial drilling on the Heidwiese, a local area of open ground, for carbonic acid (H_{2}CO_{3}).

The 20th century brought with it a new school building in 1906, and new financial help for Wallenborn from a fire insurance institution as “aid”. In 1910, a fire brigade was founded, and also a fire brigade orchestra. Waterworks came in 1921.

In 1928, an interesting find was made at the church. Behind the main altar were two gravestones, adorned with cross, chalice and host, of vicars (or chaplains) who had held office here in the 18th century, namely Michael Palandt and Josef Pickart, and who had been buried in the church. Likewise buried here was Margarete Webers née Hees from Heltermühle in Lorraine, who is believed to have been a benefactor.

The 20th century also brought world wars, and on 6 March 1945, the Second World War came to an end in Wallenborn with Allied occupation.

In 1951, Wallenborn was grouped into the Amt of Niederstadtfeld. The following year, the church was enlarged. In 1955, the St. Sebastianus-Schützenbrüderschaft Wallenborn (“Wallenborn Saint Sebastian Marksmen’s Brotherhood”) was founded. Further work was done on the church in 1966 when a new belltower was built. On 3 June of that year, three new bells were hung, consecrated to Saint Peter, Saint Mary and Saint Sebastian.

In 1970, the Verbandsgemeinde of Niederstadtfeld was dissolved, and Wallenborn was then assigned to the Verbandsgemeinde of Daun. In 1976, the Wallenborn church choir was newly founded.

In 1988, the primary school had a new gymnasium and multipurpose hall built onto it, and village renovation was completed.

== Politics ==
=== Municipal council ===
The council is made up of 8 council members, who were elected by majority vote at the municipal election held on 7 June 2009, and the honorary mayor as chairwoman.

=== Mayor ===
Wallenborn's mayor is Günter Mehles.

=== Coat of arms ===
The municipality's arms might be described thus: Gules an arrow argent, point to base, between, fesswise, a cinquefoil Or pierced azure and a lion's head crowned erased of the third, on a chief of the fourth nine jets of water of the second, the middle one highest, the others each descending in height to the sides.

The nine jets of water in the chief are meant to stand for the Wallender Born (“Wavy Spring”), which gave the municipality its name. The silver arrow is Saint Sebastian’s attribute, thus representing the municipality’s and the church’s patron saint. The Lords of Zandt bore three crowned lions in their arms, and the Lordship of Arenberg bore as an heraldic charge three cinquefoils (this device is so-called in English heraldry, but the German text describes it as a Mispel, German for the common medlar), thus explaining the charges either side of the arrow. The arms were designed in the 1980s.

== Culture and sightseeing ==
=== Natural monuments ===
The Wallender Born coldwater geyser

The village’s main point of interest is the namesake Wallender Born (“Wavy Spring”), known in the local speech as Brubbel, a mofetta whose spouting water comes from an underlying cold-water geyser.

=== Buildings ===
- Saint Sebastian’s Catholic Church (branch church; Filialkirche St. Sebastian), Kirchstraße 2 – aisleless church, 1814, expanded in 1951; in the churchyard a sandstone wayside cross from 1684.
- Hauptstraße/corner of In der Holl – wayside cross, red sandstone shaft cross of the so-called Kyllburg type, earlier half of the 17th century.
- Near Neue Straße 1 – sandstone Heiligenhäuschen (a small, shrinelike structure consecrated to a saint or saints) with niche relief, from 1812.
- Weidenbacher Straße/corner of Neue Straße – wayside cross from 162[0].
- Wayside cross, north of the village on the road to Daun, niche cross from 1629.
- Wayside cross, east of the village on the hill, niche cross from 161[7].
- Wayside cross, west of the village on a country path, sandstone shaft cross from 1819.
- Bildstock on Weidenbacher Straße with a stone relief of the Fourteen Holy Helpers, from 1812.

== Economy and infrastructure ==
Running by Wallenborn is Bundesstraße 257. Public transport is integrated into the Verkehrsverbund Region Trier (VRT), whose fares therefore apply. Bus route 523 of the Rhein-Mosel-Verkehrsgesellschaft offers weekday links to the railway station at Gerolstein on the Eifelstrecke railway between Cologne and Trier.
