= Barbara Massing (media manager) =

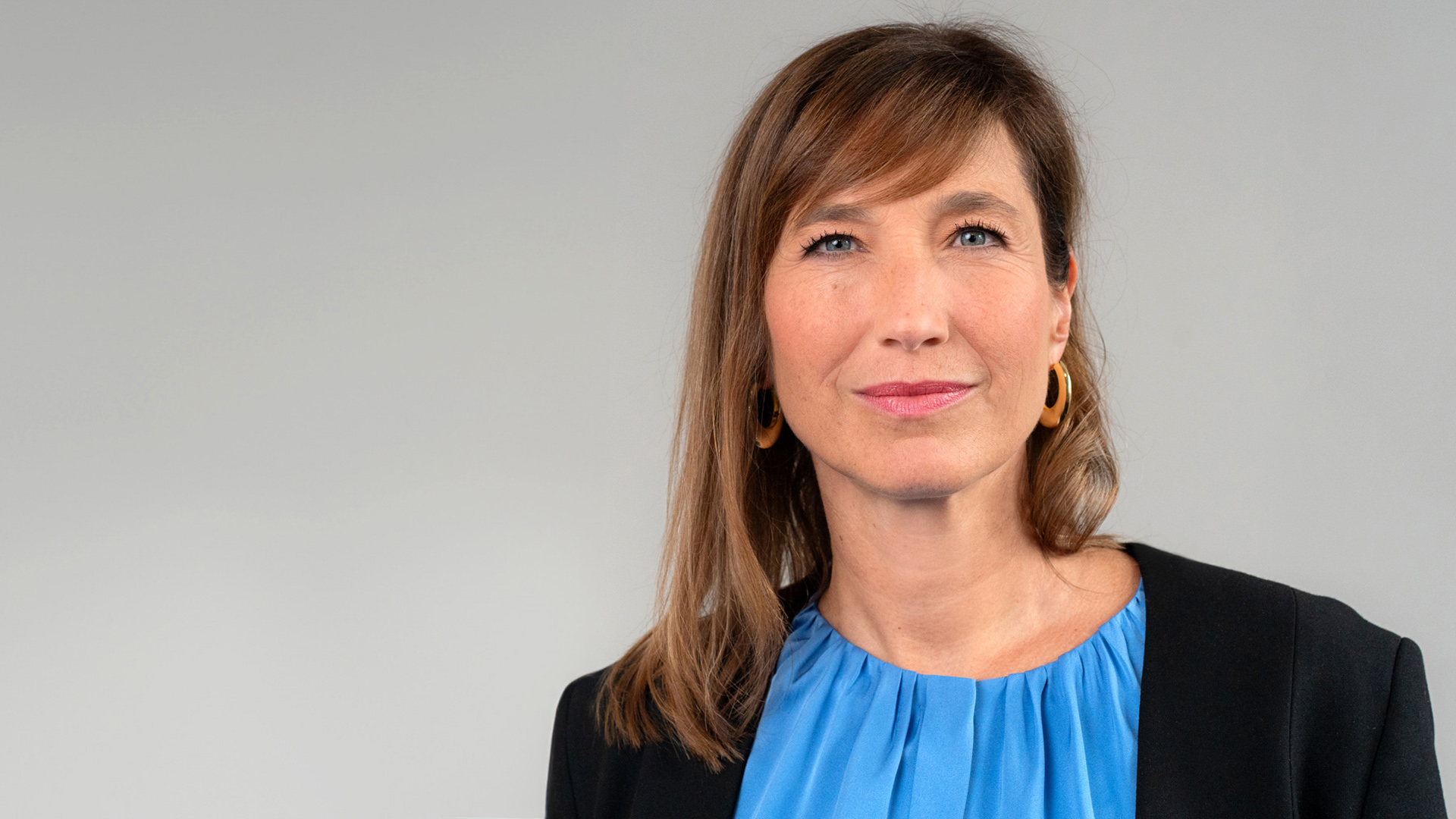
Barbara Massing (2025)

Barbara Massing (born 28 March 1971 in Andernach) is a german lawyer and media manager. In June 2025, she was electet director general of the international broadcast channel Deutsch Welle (DW) and took office in October 2025. Previously, she worked for ARD, ARTE and as a lawyer specializing in media law.

== Biography ==
Barbara Massing was born in 1971 in Andernach in the west of Germany. After graduating in 1990, Massing studied law and history in Hamburg and Berlin, specializing in media, public and international law. She completed her legal traineeship with placements at different german broadcast organisations and the German Federal Film Board.

Massing began her career as a producer for ARD and WDR, and subsequently worked as a lawyer specializing in media and internet law. From 2004 to 2006 she worked as an advisor to the management at ARTE. She began her career at DW in 2008 as a advisor in distribution and until 2008 was part of the "Science ans Society" advisory group for the European Commission. In 2014, she became administrative director and has since been a member of the management board.

=== Election as director general of Deutsche Welle. ===
On June 20, 2025, the broadcasting council of Deutsche Welle elected Barbara Massing as its new director general. She succeeded Peter Limbourg, who did not rum for re-election after twelve years in office. She took office on October 1, 2025. The election process was criticized for a lack of transparency, for example, neither the candidates nor the voting procedure were publicly discloced.

Massing is a fully qualified lawyer and a member of several supervisory and administrative boards, and has two children.
