= Caxambu =

- Municipality
- Municipality of Caxambu
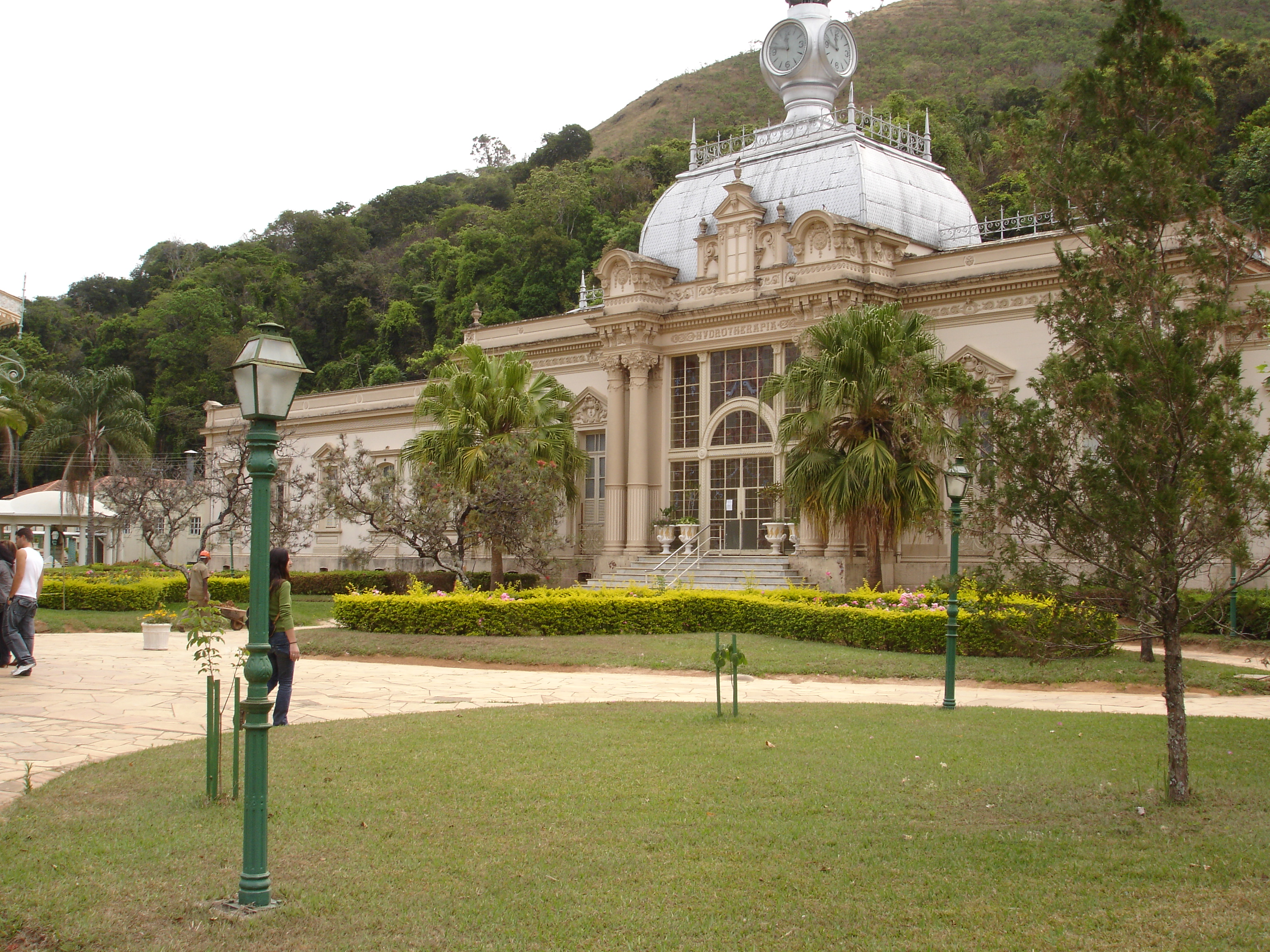
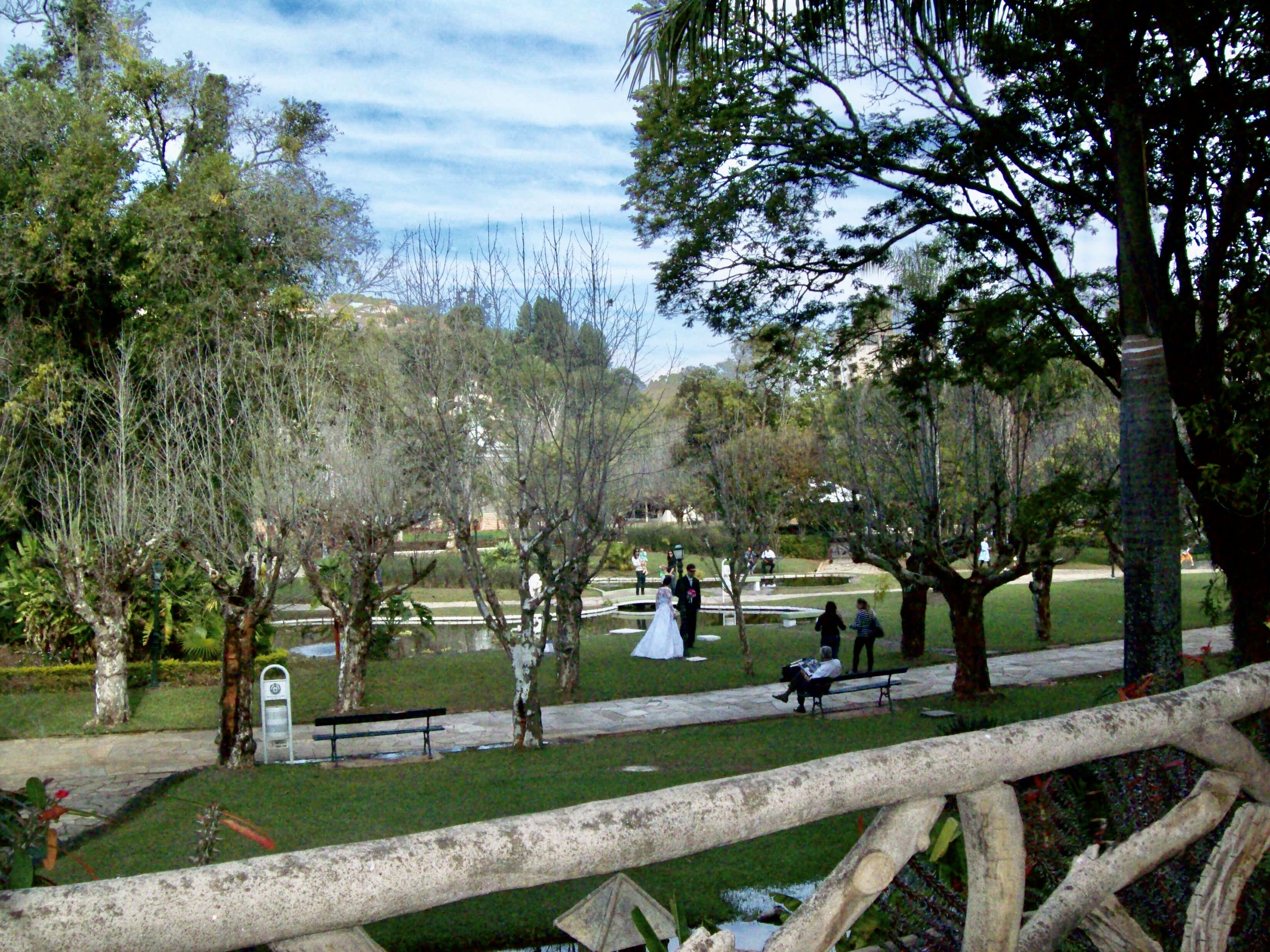
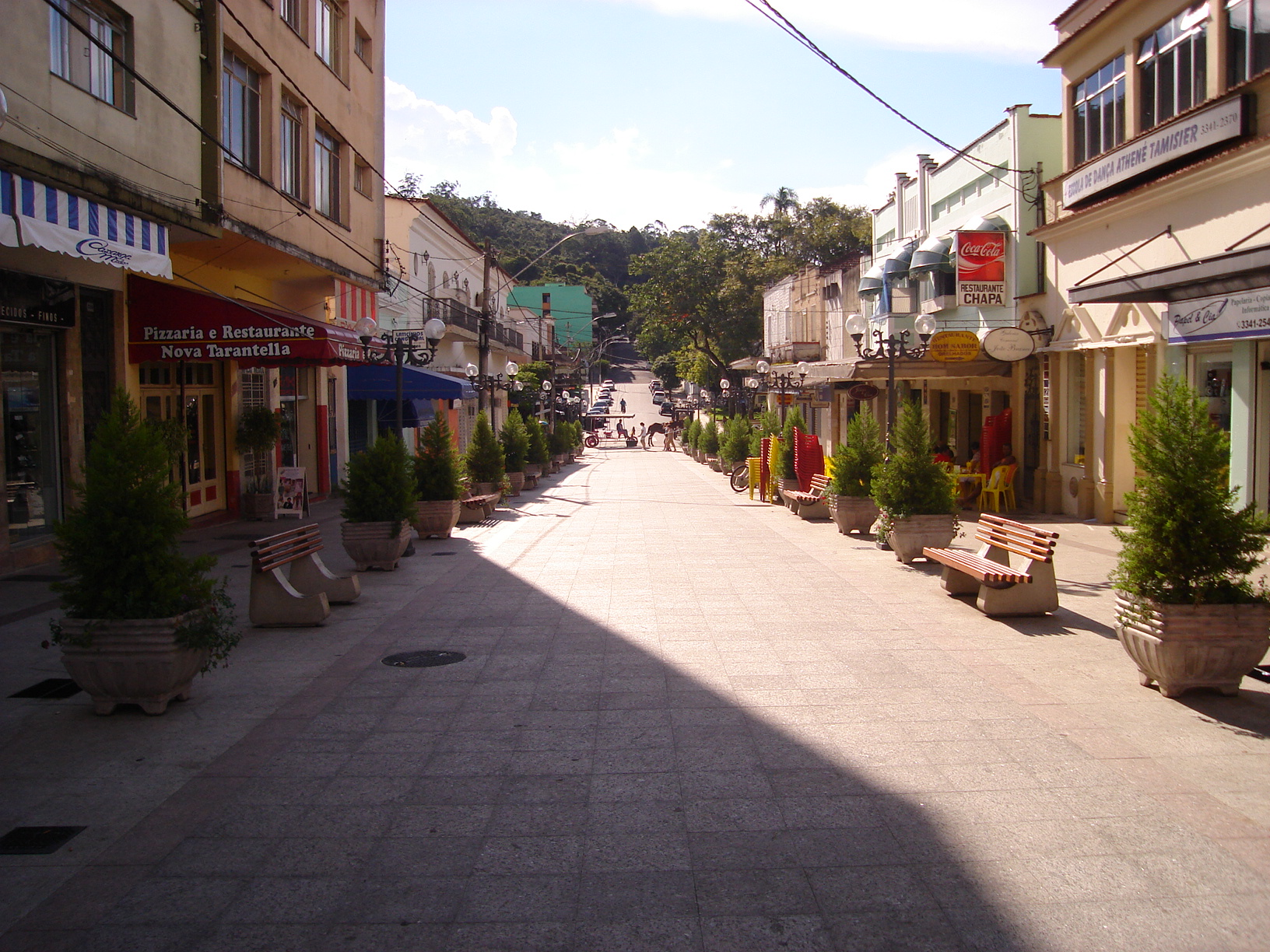
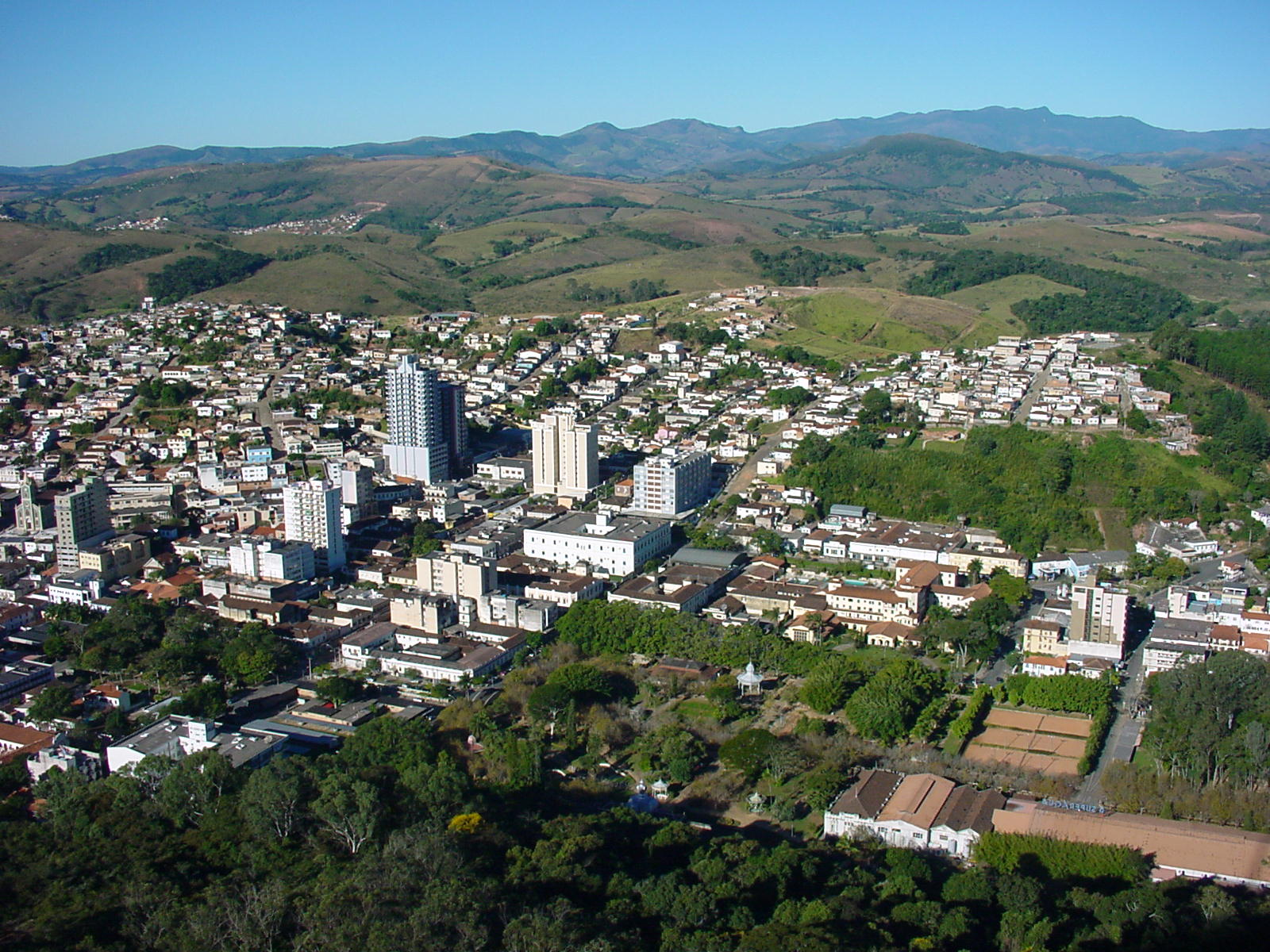
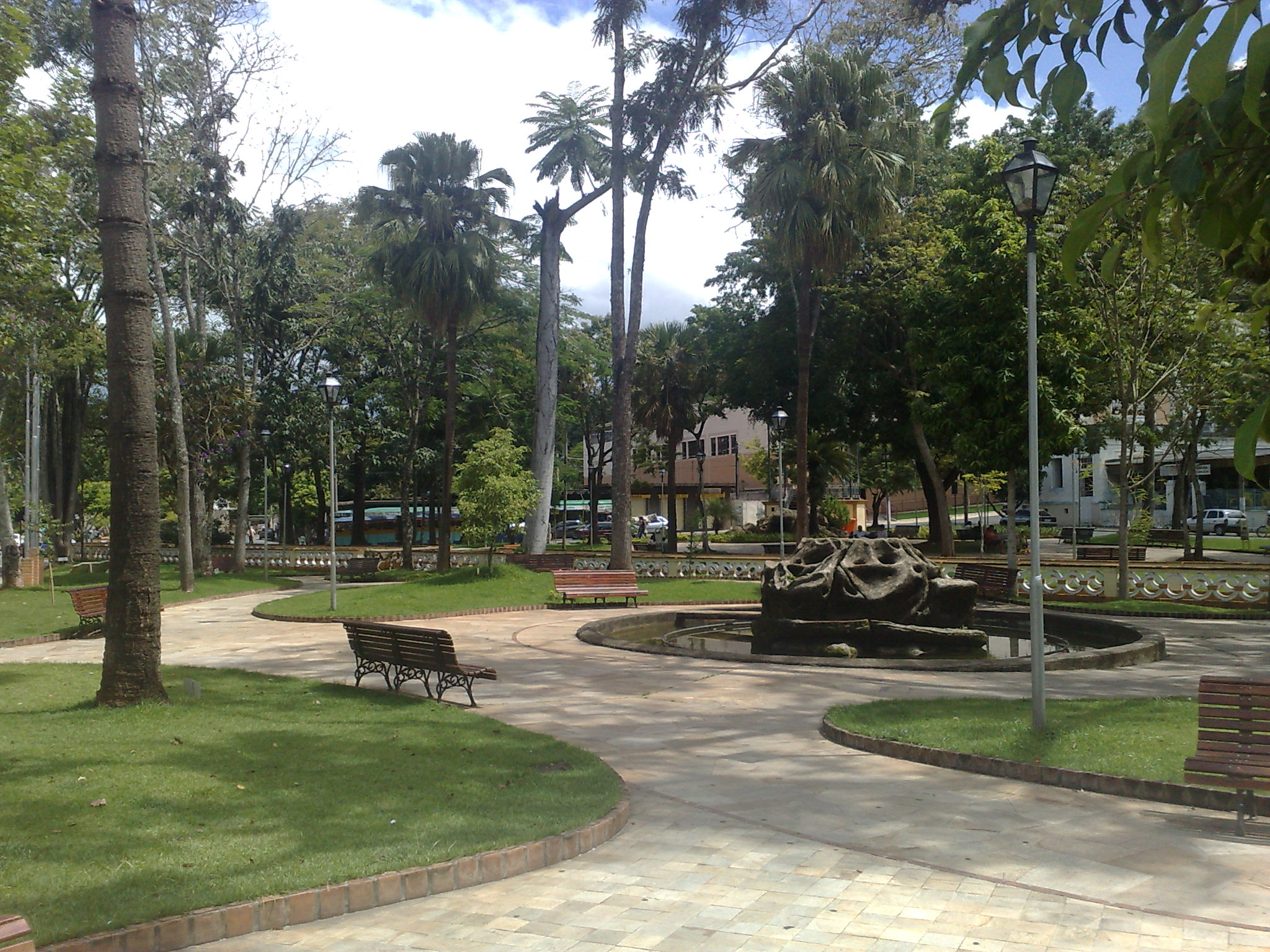
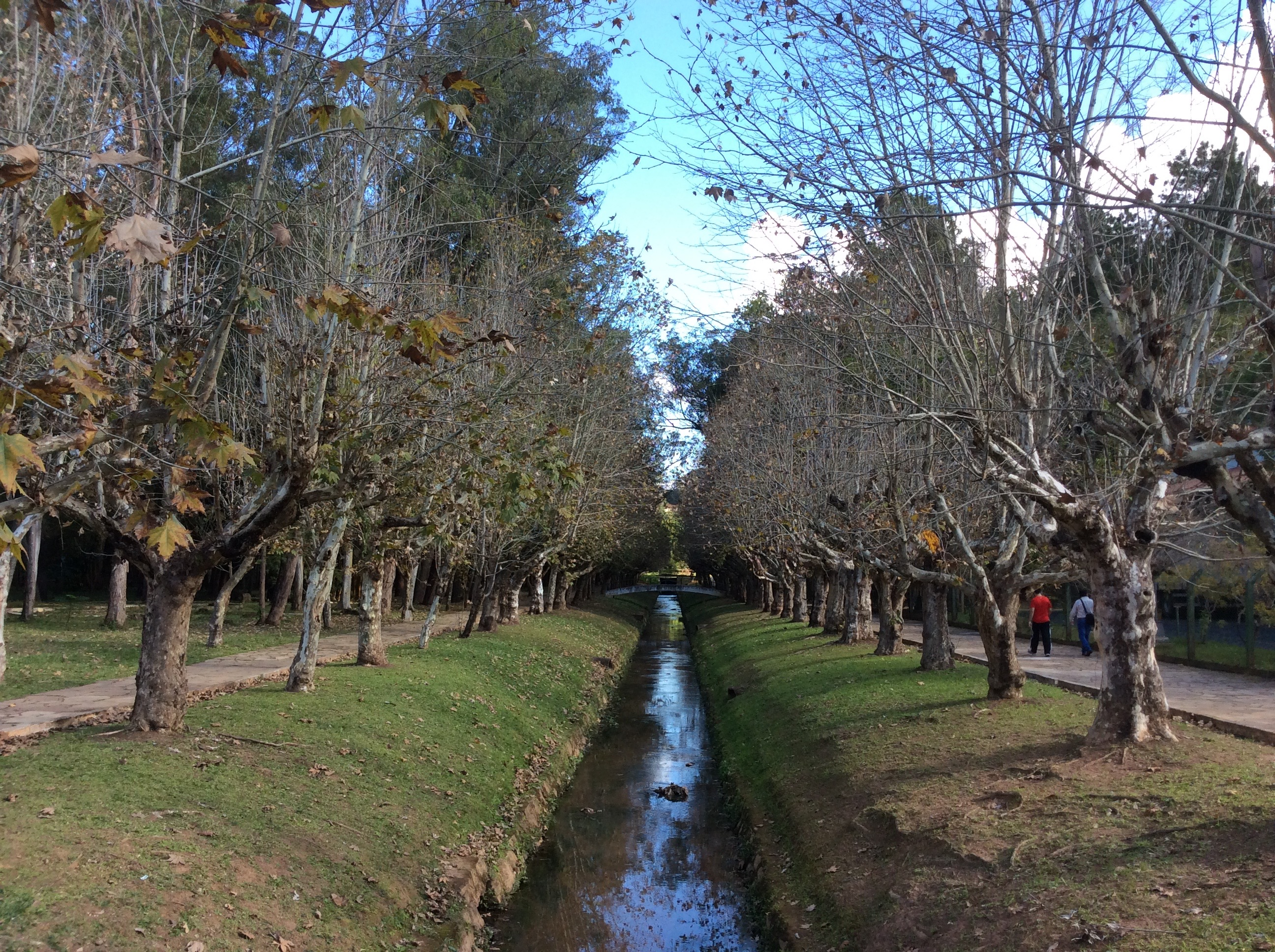
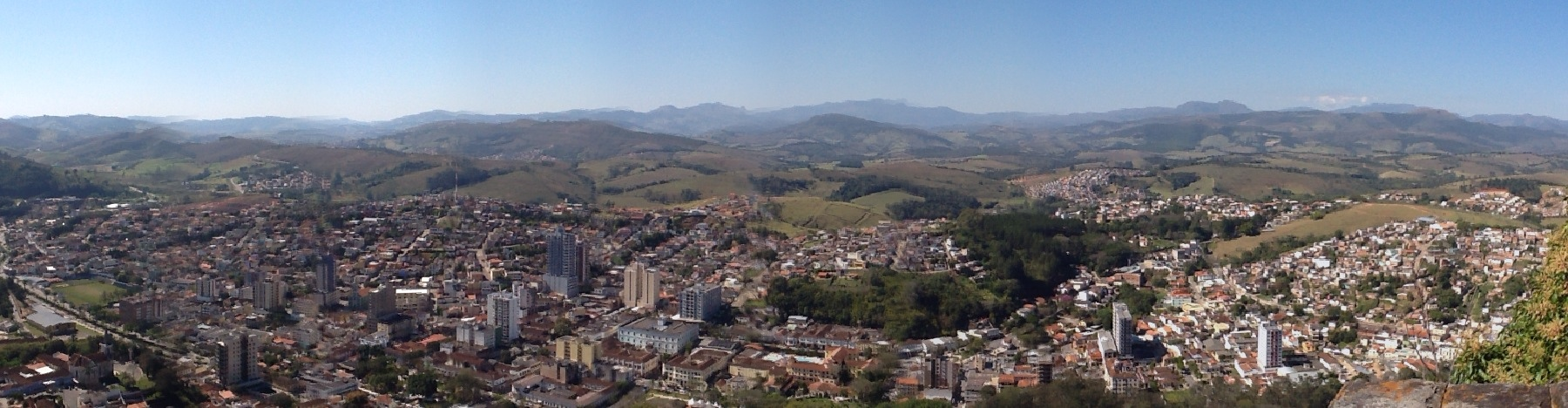

- Flag Coat of arms
- Nickname: Cidade das Águas
- Motto: Medicina entre flores "Medicine among flowers"
- Location in Minas Gerais
- Coordinates: 21°58′37″S 44°55′58″W
- Country: Brazil
- State: Minas Gerais
- Region: Southeast
- Intermediate Region: Pouso Alegre
- Immediate Region: Caxambu-Baependi
- Founded: 16 September 1901

Government
  - Mayor: Diogo Curi Hauegen (PSDB)

Area
  - Total: 100.203 km^{2} (38.689 sq mi)
- Elevation: 895 m (2,936 ft)

Population (2021)
  - Total: 21,566
  - Density: 215.22/km^{2} (557.43/sq mi)
- Demonym: caxambuense
- Time zone: UTC−3 (BRT)
- HDI (2010): 0.743 – high
- Website: caxambu.mg.gov.br

Caxambu is a Brazilian municipality in Minas Gerais. Its population in 2021 was estimated at 21,566.

Caxambu is renowned for its spa which has twelve sources of mineral sparkling water flowing 24 hours a day and a cold-water geyser.

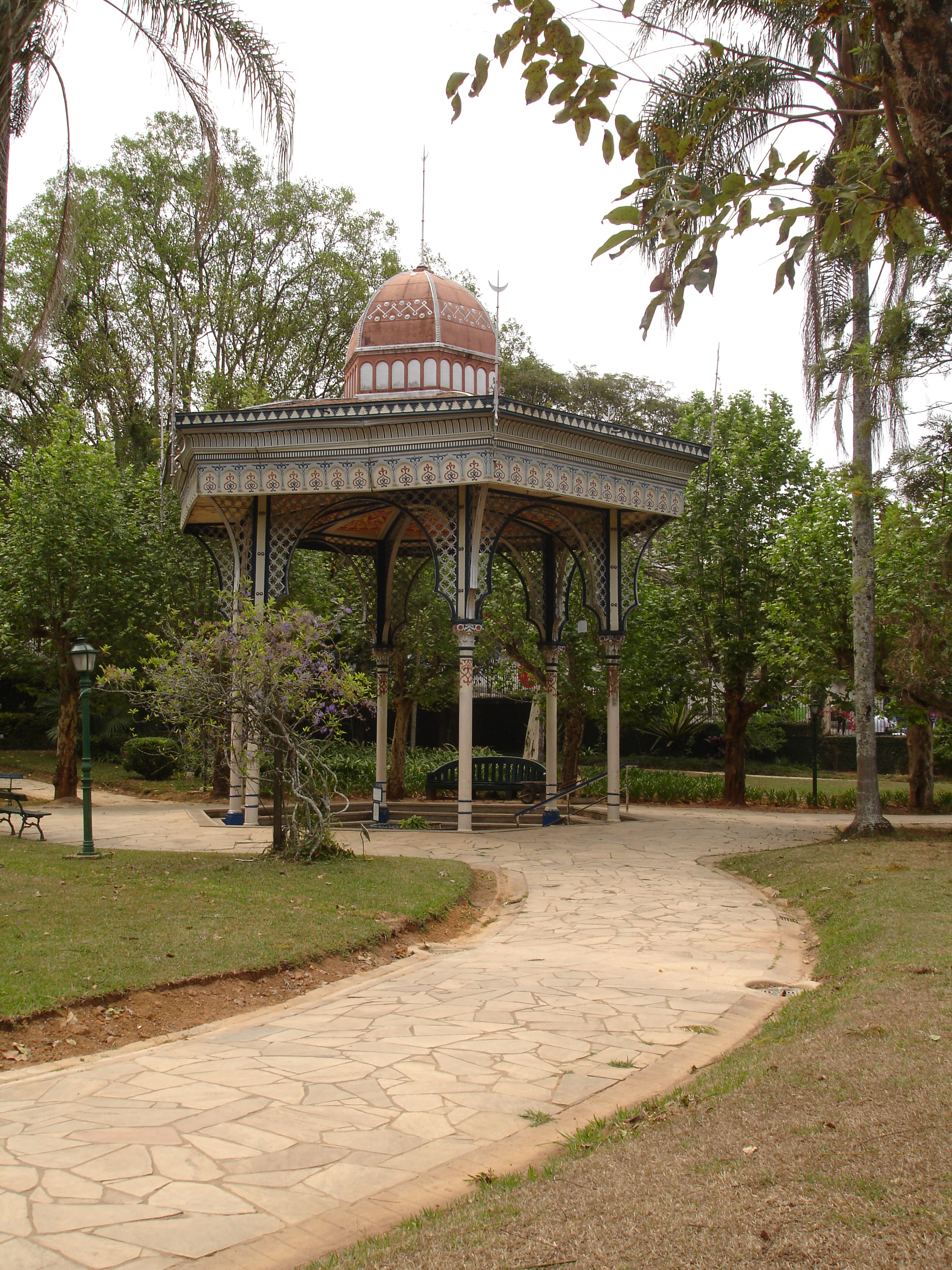
Mineral waters

== Geography ==
=== Climate ===
Climate data for Caxambu (1981–2010)
Month	Jan	Feb	Mar	Apr	May	Jun	Jul	Aug	Sep	Oct	Nov	Dec	Year
Mean daily maximum °C (°F)	28.7 (83.7)	29.5 (85.1)	28.6 (83.5)	27.5 (81.5)	25.4 (77.7)	24.1 (75.4)	24.9 (76.8)	26.4 (79.5)	27.2 (81.0)	28.1 (82.6)	28.5 (83.3)	28.3 (82.9)	27.3 (81.1)
Daily mean °C (°F)	22.5 (72.5)	22.7 (72.9)	22.1 (71.8)	20.9 (69.6)	18.3 (64.9)	16.5 (61.7)	17.1 (62.8)	18.3 (64.9)	20.0 (68.0)	21.0 (69.8)	21.7 (71.1)	21.7 (71.1)	20.2 (68.4)
Mean daily minimum °C (°F)	16.6 (61.9)	16.3 (61.3)	15.7 (60.3)	14.0 (57.2)	10.9 (51.6)	8.2 (46.8)	8.7 (47.7)	9.9 (49.8)	12.5 (54.5)	14.1 (57.4)	15.2 (59.4)	15.8 (60.4)	13.2 (55.8)
Average precipitation mm (inches)	324.3 (12.77)	211.4 (8.32)	196.4 (7.73)	72.3 (2.85)	63.4 (2.50)	30.0 (1.18)	13.3 (0.52)	15.7 (0.62)	83.5 (3.29)	121.3 (4.78)	209.3 (8.24)	333.4 (13.13)	1,674.3 (65.92)
Average precipitation days (≥ 1.0 mm)	17	13	13	6	5	2	2	3	7	9	13	17	107
Average relative humidity (%)	75.5	73.9	74.9	72.5	73.0	69.6	67.3	65.1	66.1	68.9	71.1	75.6	71.1
Source: Instituto Nacional de Meteorologia

== See also ==
- List of municipalities in Minas Gerais
