= Andernach =

- Town
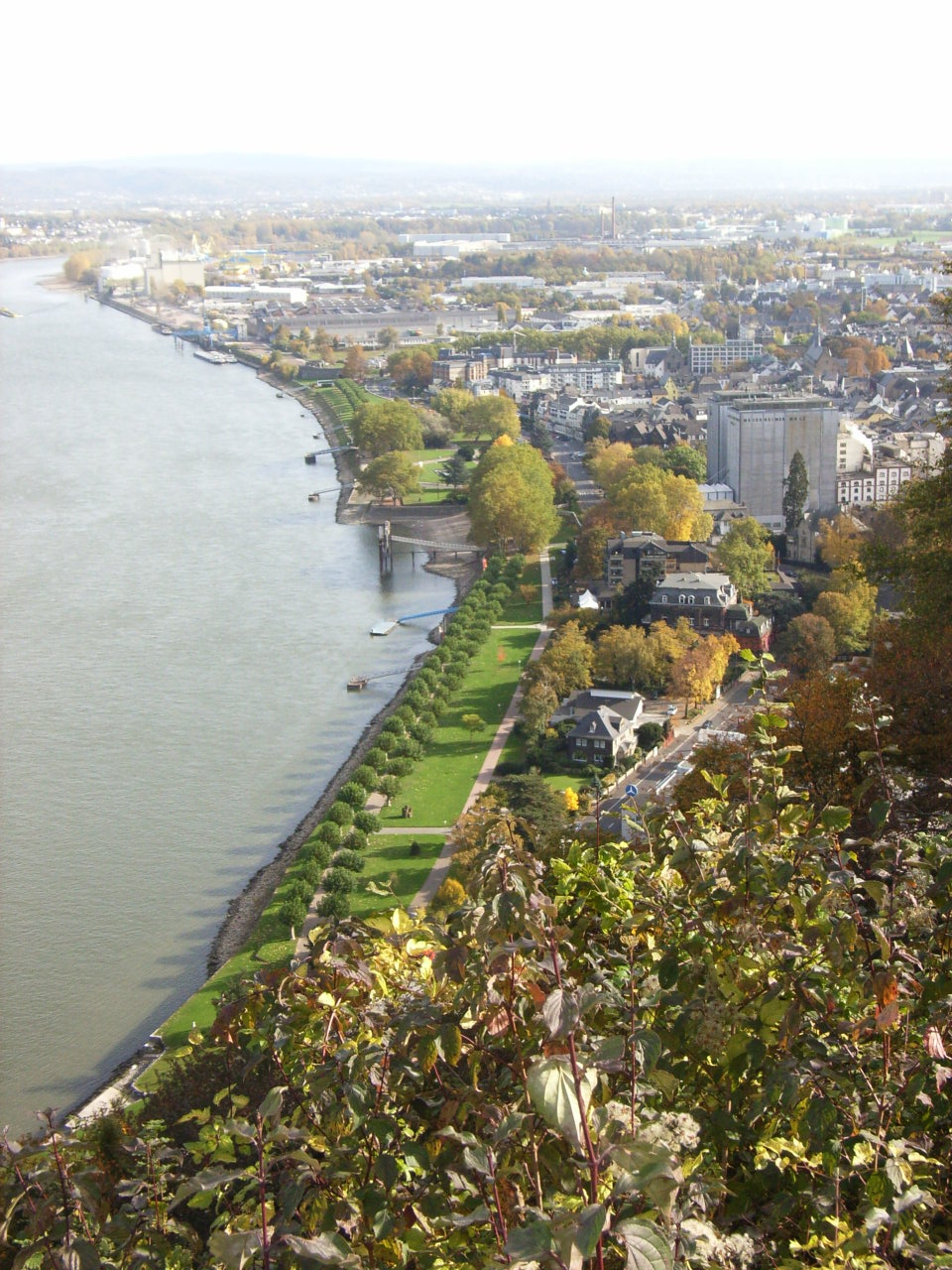

- Coat of arms

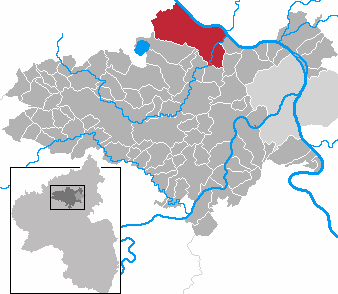
- Location of Andernach within Mayen-Koblenz district
- Interactive map of Andernach
- Location within Germany Location within Rhineland-Palatinate
- Coordinates: 50°26′23″N 7°24′06″E
- Country: Germany
- State: Rhineland-Palatinate
- District: Mayen-Koblenz

Government
  - Mayor (2022–30): Christian Greiner

Area
  - Total: 53.34 km^{2} (20.59 sq mi)
- Elevation: 60 m (200 ft)

Population (2025-12-31)
  - Total: 29,920
  - Density: 560.9/km^{2} (1,453/sq mi)
- Time zone: UTC+01:00 (CET)
  - Summer (DST): UTC+02:00 (CEST)
- Postal codes: 56626
- Dialling codes: 02632
- Vehicle registration: MYK
- Website: www.andernach.de

Andernach (German pronunciation: [ˈandɐˌnax]) is a town in the district of Mayen-Koblenz, in Rhineland-Palatinate, Germany, of about 30,000 inhabitants. It is situated towards the end of the Neuwied basin on the left bank of the Rhine between the former tiny fishing village of Fornich in the north and the mouth of the small river Nette in the southeast, just 21 kilometres (13 miles) north of Koblenz, with its five external town districts: Kell, Miesenheim, Eich, Namedy, and Bad Tönisstein.

A few hundred metres downstream of Andernach the Rhine valley narrows from both sides forming the northern part of the romantic Middle Rhine stretch. Already in Roman times the place the narrow passage begins was named "Porta Antunnacensis" or Andernachian Gate. It is formed by two hills, the Krahnenberg (engl. Crane hill) and the Engwetter (Narrow weather) on the right bank near the wine village Leutesdorf (external town district of Bad Hönningen). The crane hill is named after the old crane beneath his foot (see below); in earlier times (until 1650) the hill was named "Geiersberg" ("Vulture's hill").

After World War II it was the site of two Rheinwiesenlager temporary prison camps.

== The town ==
=== Coat of arms and town seal ===
The coat of arms of Andernach known since 1344 (the colours appeared first in 1483) shows a black cross on a white escutcheon (shield) charged with a pair of X-shapedly arranged red keys. It is described in heraldic language as Argent a cross sable charged with keys in saltire gules.

The black cross on silver symbolizes the governance of the Electorate of Cologne; the keys refer to St. Peter the patron saint of the Archbishopric of Trier (and of the cathedral of Trier), of which Andernach formed part. The red (key) colour adverts to the red cross (on silver) in the coat of arms of the Electorate of Trier.

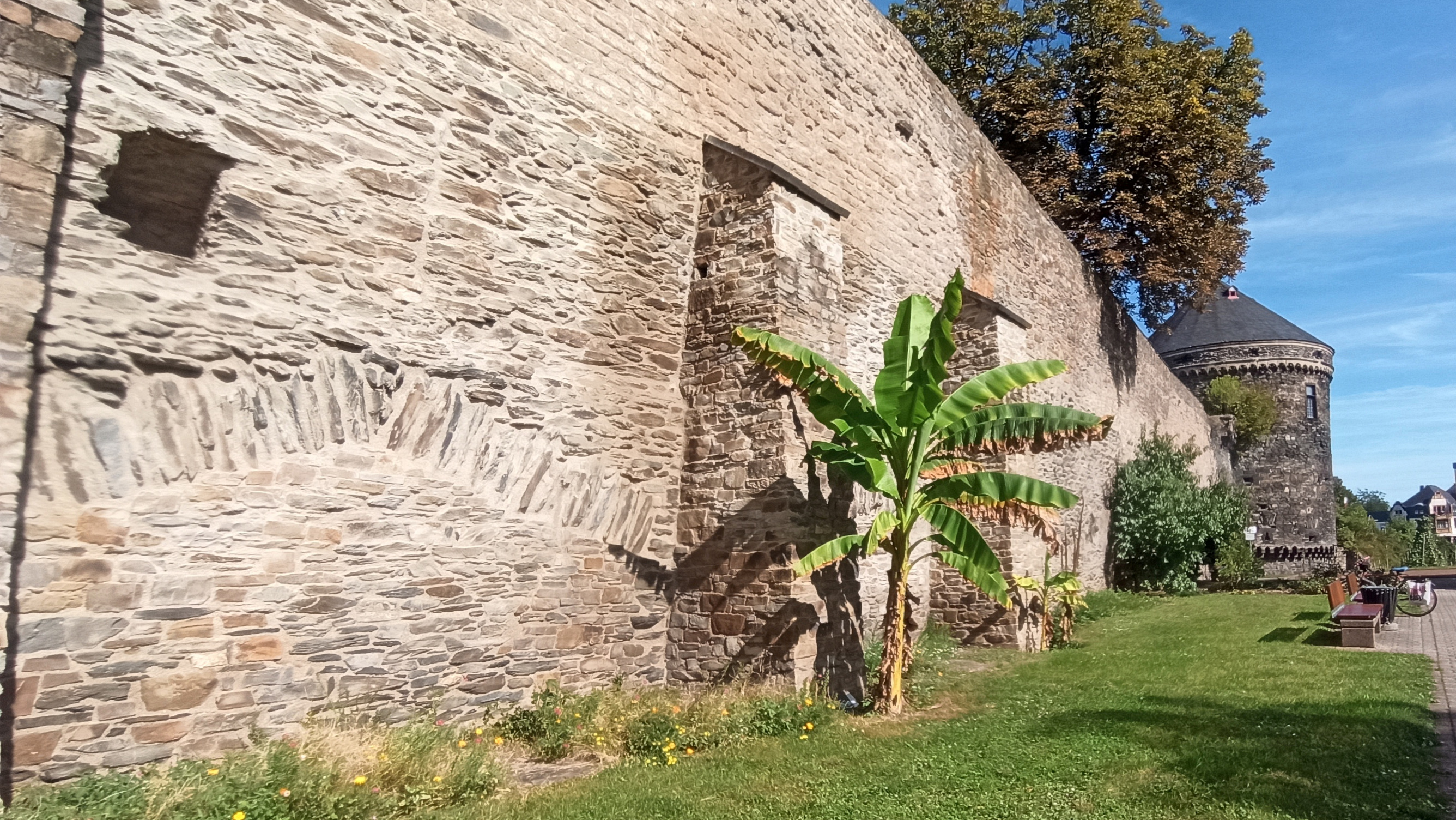
Andernach medieval fortifications, photo from 2023

The oldest town seal shows St. Mary sitting on a throne with a church in her right hand and with the left hand holding a town. The seal inscription says: MATER DEI PATRONA CIVIUM ANDERNACENSIUM – Mother of God, patron saint of the Andernachian citizens. The oldest seal was made before 1200, the oldest seal impression dates from the year 1250.

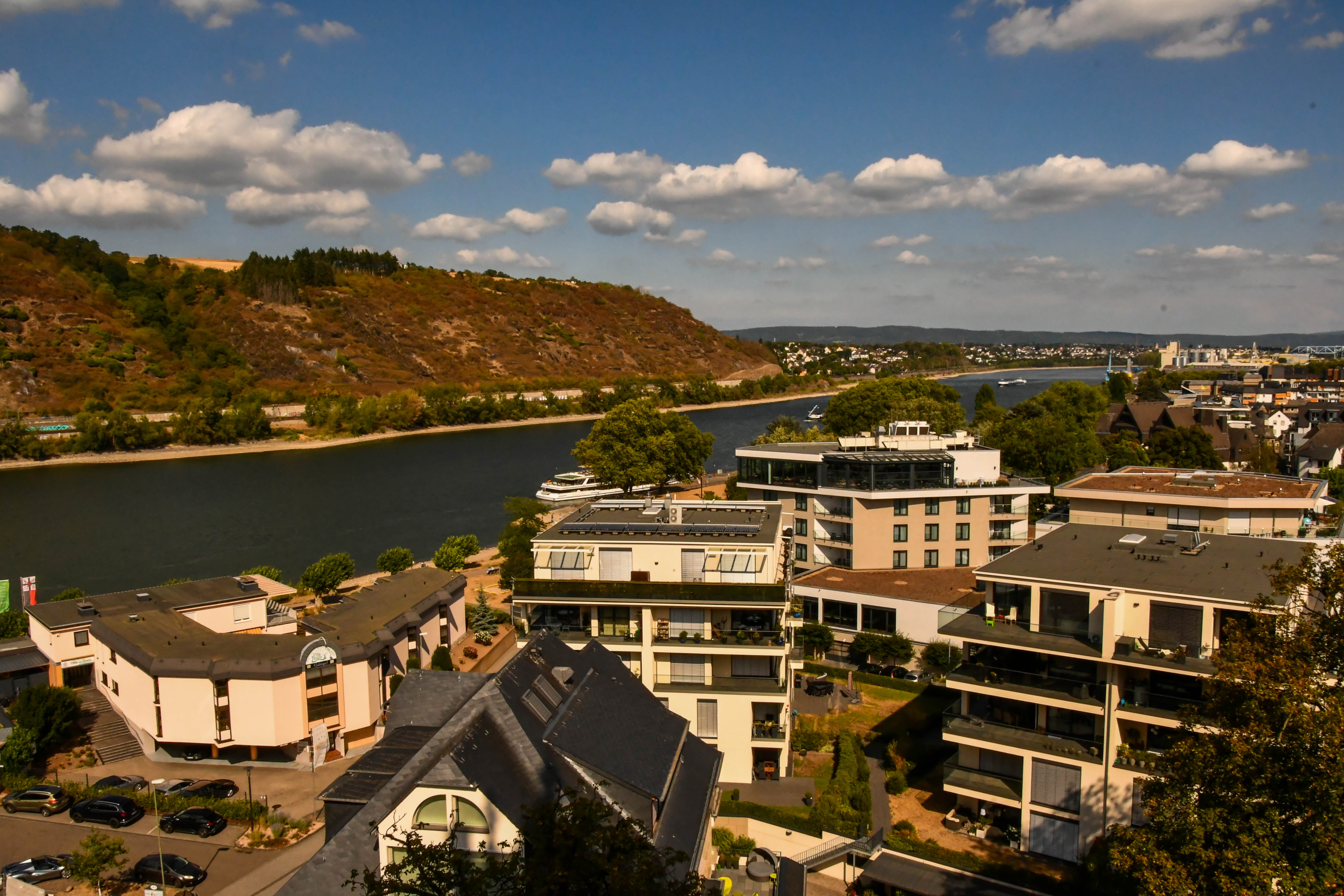
View to Andernach

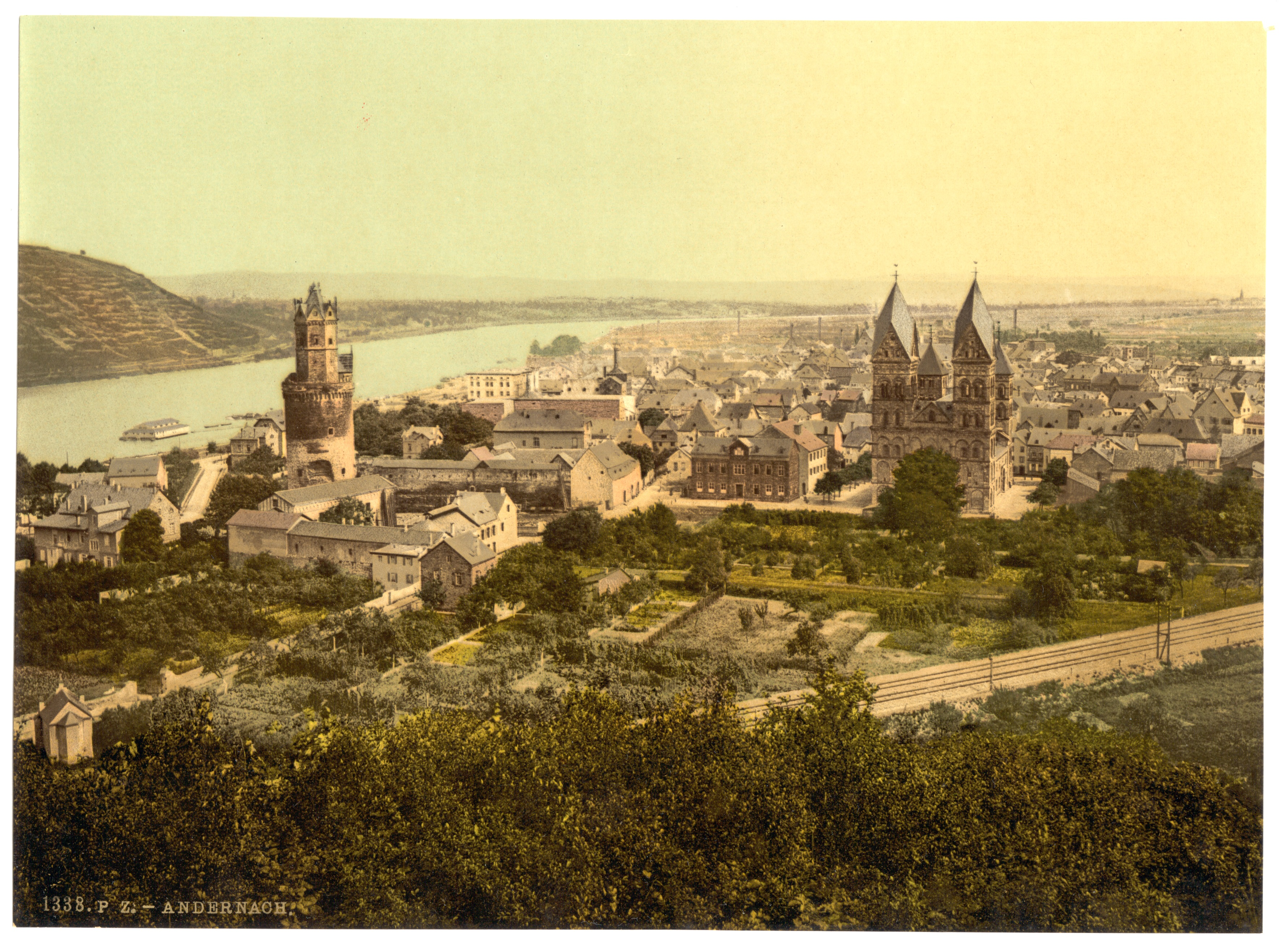
Andernach in 1900 with "Round Tower" and "St. Mary Assumption Church"; the Rhine river is visible in the background; in the foreground the new railway tracks

=== Description ===
Founded by the Romans as Antunnacum in 12 BC on the site of an old Celtic settlement probably called Antunnuac, Andernach is one of the oldest towns in Germany which as such held its "Bimillenary feast" in 1988. Both the Roman and the Celtic names mean "village or farm of Antunnos/us"—a man not yet identified. It was the southernmost outpost of the Electorate of Cologne from the 12th to the 19th century. In addition to the touristically appealing medieval remnants of the old town fortifications, the city of Andernach is the location of several old industrial plants such as a huge malt mill (the last one of more than ten mills and breweries from the 19th and 20th centuries dismantled in 2008). In the 19th century the town was noted for the production of millstones, bricks and clay for making tobacco pipes. Among the more modern of its industrial / manufacturing base is a large steel-mill to produce cold formed tin plate and companies manufacturing medicinal products, raw food materials, cast iron products, engines and engine parts. Tourists who come to the region usually visit the medieval fortifications such as the 56-metre-tall (183 ft) "Round Tower" (Ger. "Der Runde Turm") finished in 1453, the archiepiscopal (Electorate of Cologne) castle ruins with a well-preserved keep, and the remains of the town wall with several well-restored wall towers and two gates: the "Rhine Gate" (das "Rheintor") built around 1200 as the "Grain Gate" (die "Kornpforte"; last renovation and reconstruction in 1899 after 17th century plans) and the "Coblencian Gate" ("Koblenzer Tor"), originally called the "Castle Gate" ("Burgpforte"); in medieval and Renaissance times up to the 19th century the German word "Pforte" (from Latin "porta") was used for town and church gates instead of "Tor".

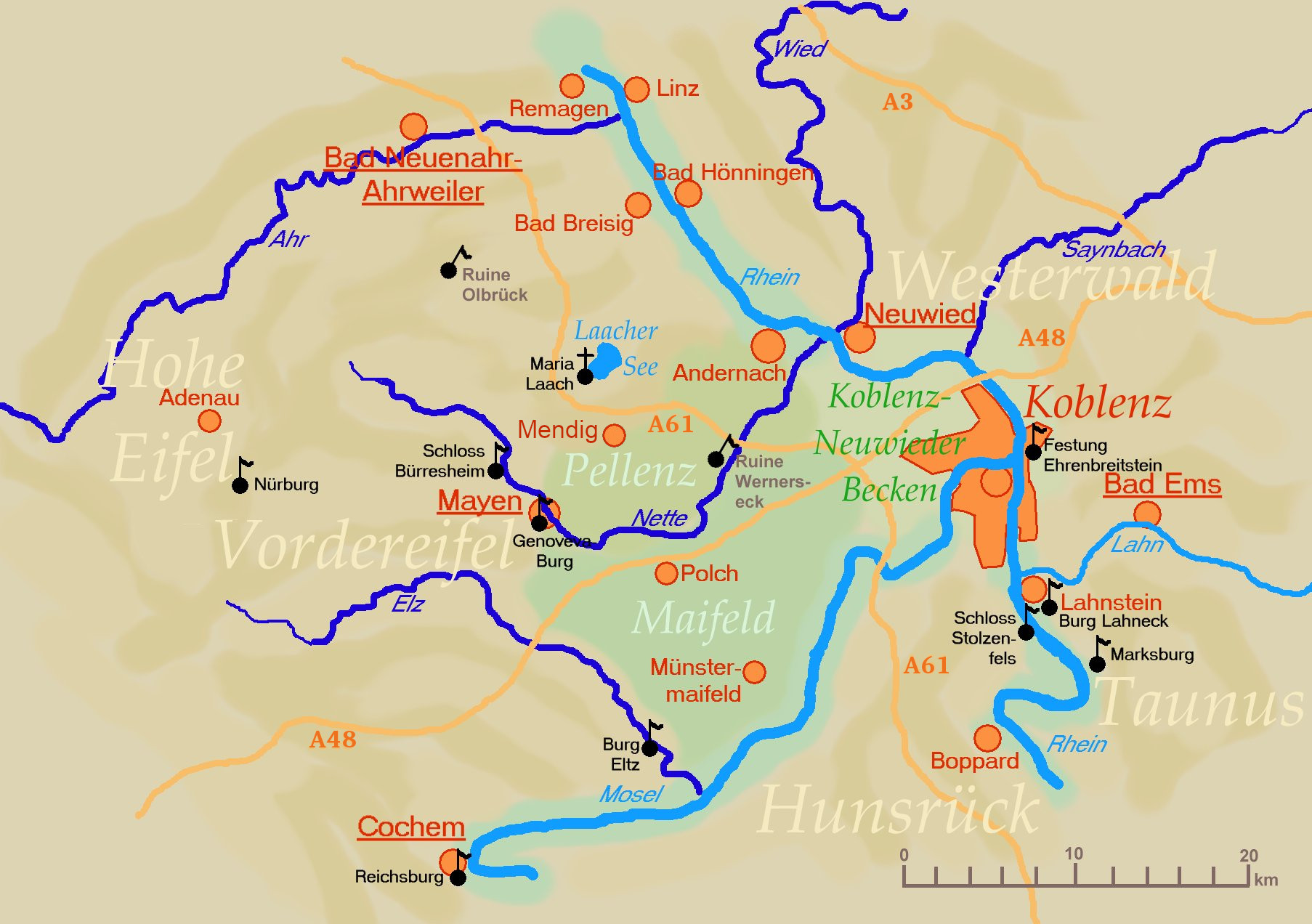
Map of regions in the vicinity of Andernach

Another attraction from its ancient industrial past is the "Old Crane" of Andernach (Ger. der "Alte Krahnen"), a 16th-century stony land based treadwheel tower crane 8.8 m (29 ft) in diameter and 9.4 m (31 ft) high situated outside the town downstream close to the river bank of the old harbour where it replaced an even older 14th century wooden floating treadwheel crane. For 350 years it was in operation from 1561 to 1911. Two to four men were required to rotate the crane top by means of a huge double ended lever (horizontal wooden bar) attached to the vertical wooden crane "beam" and four others on a (treadwheel men or menials) to operate the huge wooden twin treadwheels (more than 4.3 m or 14 ft in diameter) which lifted and lowered the load—mainly millstones, tuff-stone blocks for the Netherlands and wine casks. This treadwheel crane with stone walls (most cranes had a timber housing) is one of only a few of its kind in Europe to have survived. A prince-electoral order or permission was needed to build and operate such a crane in the times of the Holy Roman Empire.

The Catholic "St. Mary Assumption Parish Church" locally known as "Church of Our Lady" or "St. Mary's Cathedral" (Ger. "Pfarrkirche Maria Himmelfahrt", "Liebfrauenkirche", or "Mariendom") is the oldest historical attraction in Andernach, some of which date back to the 11th century. The Andernach Gesangbuch of 1608 contains the tune to the English hymn 'This day the first of days was made' harmonised by Ralph Vaughan Williams.

The town palais "von der Leyen house" (Ger. "Haus von der Leyen"), named after its builder district magistrate and governor of the prince-elector, "Georg III von der Leyen," dates back to 1600. Built in renaissance and baroque styles it now houses the town museum since 1936 and again since 1969. It displays among others a fine model of the Roman "castrum" Antunnacum, a 17th-century town model in ~1:600 scale and a thoroughly assembled model (~1:90) of the prince-electoral town castle.

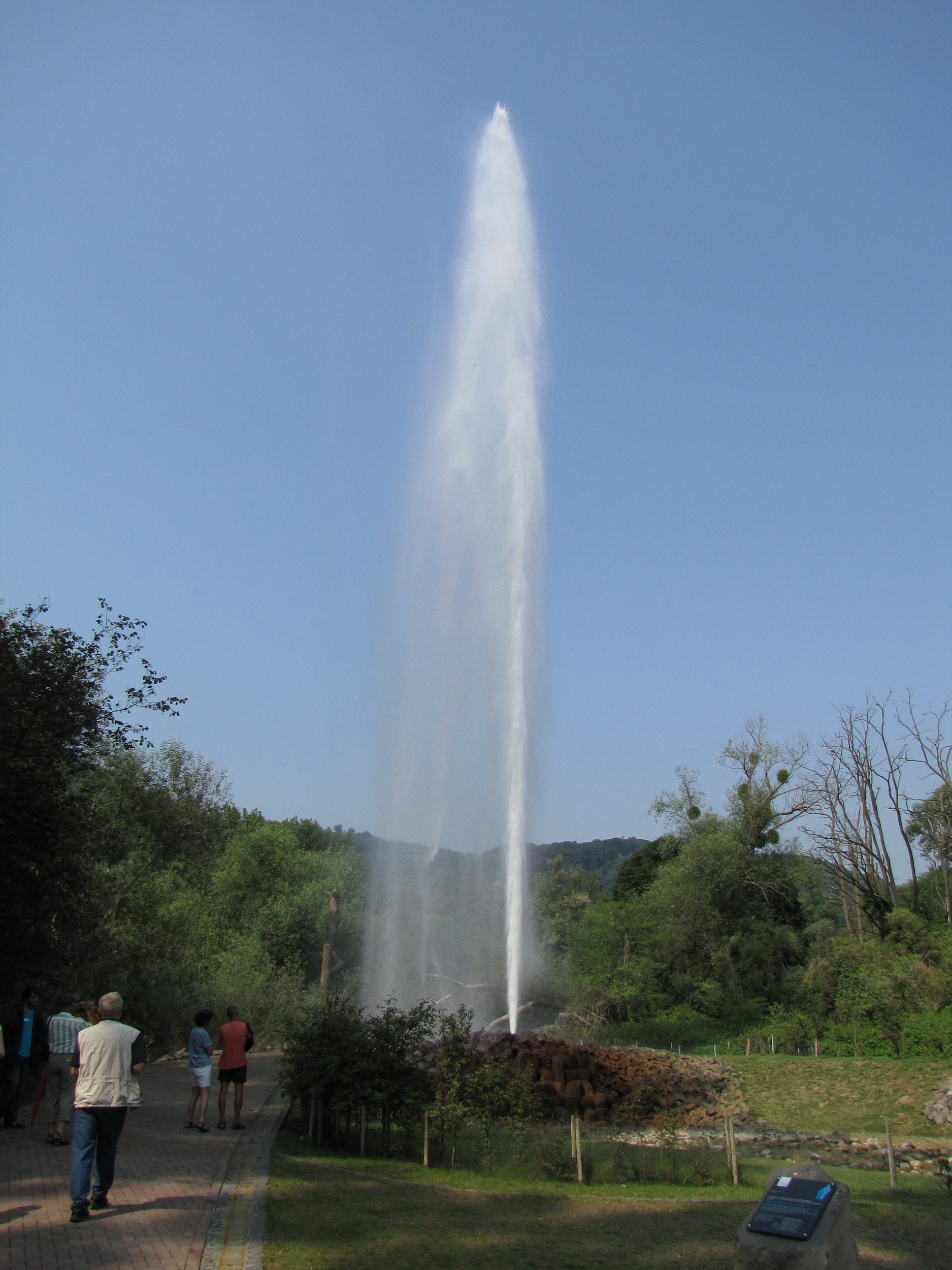
Andernach Geyser, the world's highest cold-water geyser

One of Andernach's natural attractions is the world's highest (max. 64 m or 210 ft) cold-water geyser, driven by carbon dioxide with force generated in a fashion similar to that in a shaken bottle of table water. It is located a little less than 800 metres (1/2 mile) downstream from the "Crane" in the Nature Reserve of "Namedyer Werth" (MHG for "island of Namedy") now a peninsula. Activated for the first time in 1903, the geyser was shut down in 1957 but reactivated early in the current century as yet another city attraction.

=== Jewish history ===
In the 12th century, Benjamin of Tudela described Andernach as one of the 13 on the Rhine with important Jewish communities. Jewish residents in Andernach were first mentioned in the Köln archives in 1255. The Jewish community was periodically persecuted during the 13th to 15th centuries. On 3 August 1287 Archbishop Siegfried II of Westerburg issued a protection decree for the town Jews from the local Burghers. Persecutions occurred especially during the 14th century by the Arnold von Uissigheim "Armleder" persecutions and in 1348–1349, as a result of the Black Death Jewish persecutions. It appears as if between the 15th and the 19th centuries no Jews lived in Andernach. In 1860, a new Jewish community was founded in Andernach. Its cemetery, dated to 1888, is part of the city cemetery on KoblenzerStrasse. On Kristallnacht in 1938, the town synagogue was set on fire and most of the young men were taken to Dachau. At least 11 Jews who used to live in Andernach were murdered during the Holocaust, and no Jews lived in Andernach after 1945. Several sites commemorate the history of Jewish community of Andernach. An ancient Jewish Mikveh, dated to the 13th century, is one of the oldest ones in Europe and can be found under the old town house, built in the 16th century close to the site where the synagogue stood. The Mikveh can be visited.

== Population development ==
Year	Inhabitants
1790	1.790
1812	2.451
1850	3.500
1871	4.482
1895	6.583

Year	Inhabitants
1905	8,789
1933	12,523
1950	15,879
1970	27,140
1995	30,343

Year	Inhabitants
1998	30,437
2000	30,263
2004	30,359
2005	30,987

Year	Inhabitants
2006	30,567
2010	30,379
2012	30,343
2014	29,500

== Lord Mayors ==
Until 1969 the Lord Mayor was named Mayor.

- 1935–1945: Alois Spaniol (NSDAP)
- 1946–1948: Egon Herfeldt (CDP, later FWG)
- 1949–1964: Johann Füth (CDU)
- 1965–1974: Walter Steffens (CDU)
- 1974–1994: Gerold Küffmann (CDU)
- 1994–2023: Achim Hütten (born 1957), (SPD)
- since 2023: Christian Greiner (FWG)

== Mayors ==
- 1965–1975: Werner Klein (SPD) (1928–1985)
- 1975–1982: Helmuth Günter (CDU)
- 1983–1993: Rainer Krämer (SPD)
- 1993–1994: Achim Hütten (SPD)
- 1994–2002: Franz Breil (FWG)
- 2002–2010: Josef Nonn (CDU)
- since 2010: Claus Peitz (CDU)

== Literature ==
Honoré de Balzac set his short story L'Auberge rouge in Andernach. It is also the birthplace of twentieth-century American author Charles Bukowski.

== Music ==
The Dutch folk song "T'Andernaken" (In Andernach) is about two girls from Andernach.

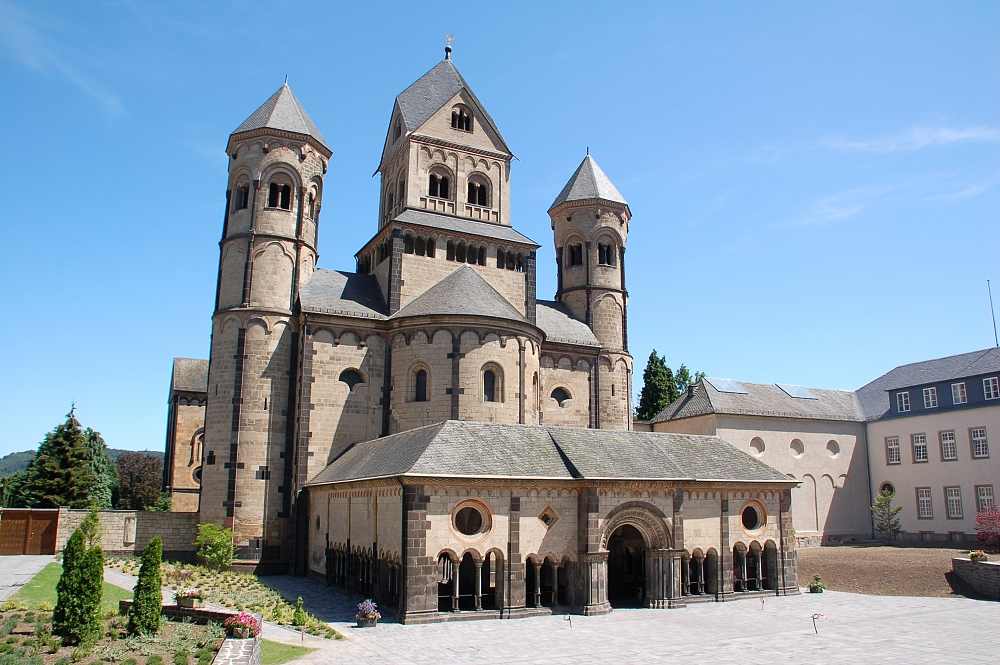
Maria Laach Abbey

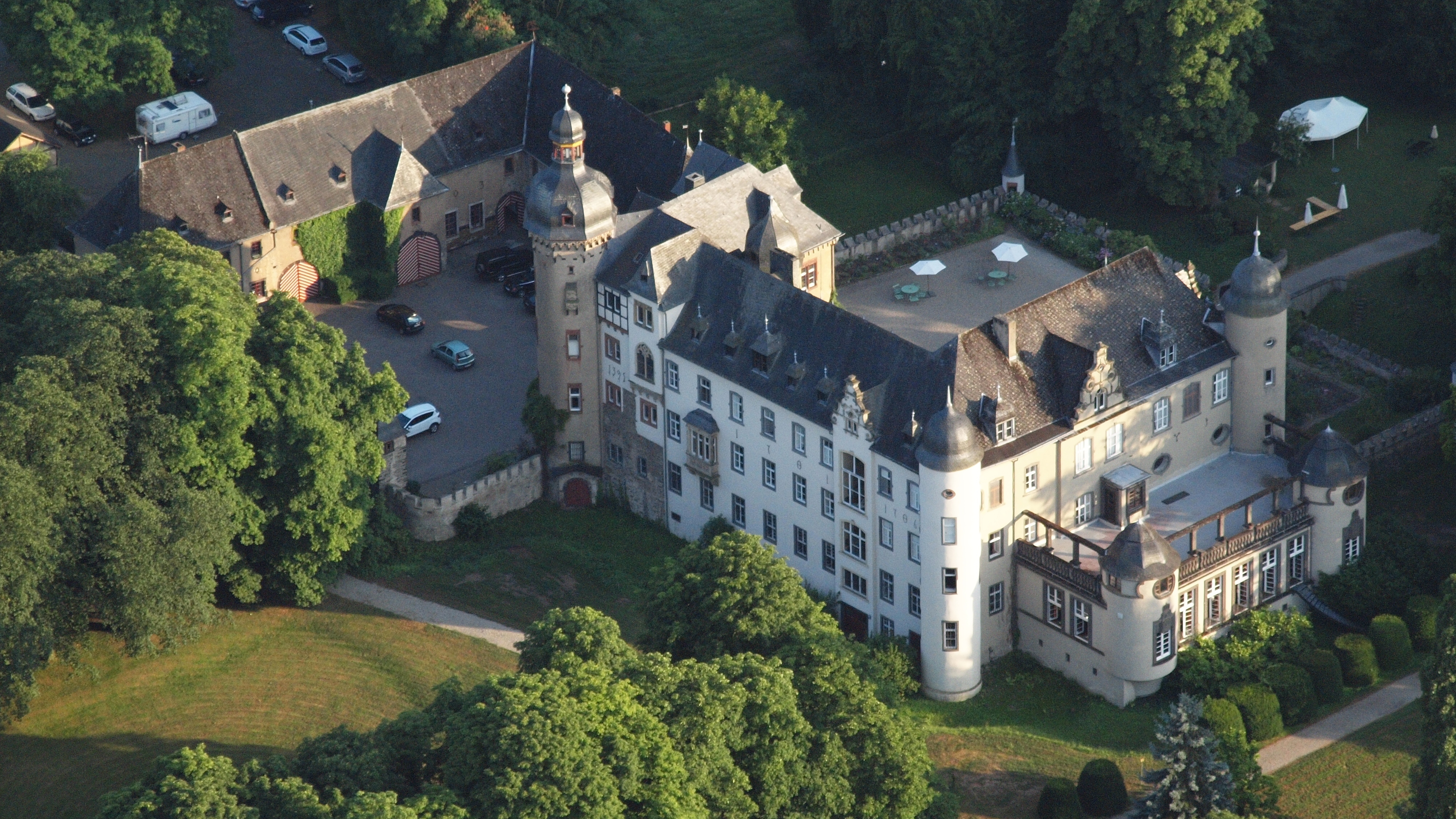
Namedy Castle

== Nazi victims ==
During World War II a transit camp for the Nazi victims of Action T4 was in the town. The institute in Andernach sent mentally ill patients and disabled people to the Hadamar Euthanasia Centre, where they were murdered. Between 1941 and 1944 about 1,560 people were sent to Hadamar through the Andernach transit hospital. In 1996, a memorial was built at the city center, commemorating the victims. The interior of the memorial is lined with mirrors on which the names of the known victims are engraved. 400 other dots stand for victims whose names are unknown.

== Twin towns – sister cities ==
Andernach is twinned with:

- Dimona, Israel
- Ekeren (Antwerp), Belgium
- Farnham, England, United Kingdom
- Saint-Amand-les-Eaux, France
- Stockerau, Austria
- Zella-Mehlis, Germany

== People ==
- Johann Winter von Andernach (1505–1574), humanist physician
- Johann Baptista Baltzer (1803–1871), a German Catholic theologian.
- Christian Mohr (1823-1888), sculptor.
- Charles Bukowski (1920–1994), poet and writer
- Puig Aubert (1925–1994), French rugby league footballer
- Hans Belting (1935–2023), art historian and media theorist
- Ralf Walter (born 1958), politician (SPD), Member of the European Parliament 1994–2009
- Clemens Hoch (born 1978), politician (SPD)
- Christian Sturm (born 1978), opera and concert singer
- Daniel Bauer (born 1982), footballer
- Markus Pazurek (born 1988), footballer
- Stefan Bell (born 1991), footballer

=== Associated with Andernach ===
- Inge Helten (born 1950), athlete (sprinter) of the DJK Andernach up to 1971, 1976 100-metre world record, as well as silver and bronze at the Olympic Games 1976
- Stephan Ackermann (born 1963), theologian, made 1981 his abitur at the Kurfürst-Salentin-Gymnasium, since 2009 Bishop of Trier

== Transport ==
Miesenheim stop

Andernach train station is located at Left Rhine Railway, served by long distance trains as well as RE5 (Koblenz Hbf - Wesel, RB26 (Mainz - Koblenz - Bonn - Cologne), RB32 (Koblenz - Ahrbrück) as well as Cross Eifel Railway (RB23 and RB38) (Andernach - Mayen - Kaisersesch - Ulmen - Daun - Gerolstein), the section between Kaisersesch and Gerolstein is currently out of service, the section from Andernach up to Kaisersesch operated by section Lahn-Eifel-Bahn of Deutsche Bahn.

Two more train stations are in Andernach, Namedy on Left Rhine Railway and Miesenheim at Cross Eifel Railway.

Andernach station also has a park and ride lot for public transport users.

Andernach is located in the public local transport association VRM, zone number 306.

== See also ==
- Andernach chess
