= Christian Sturm =

German tenor (born 1978)

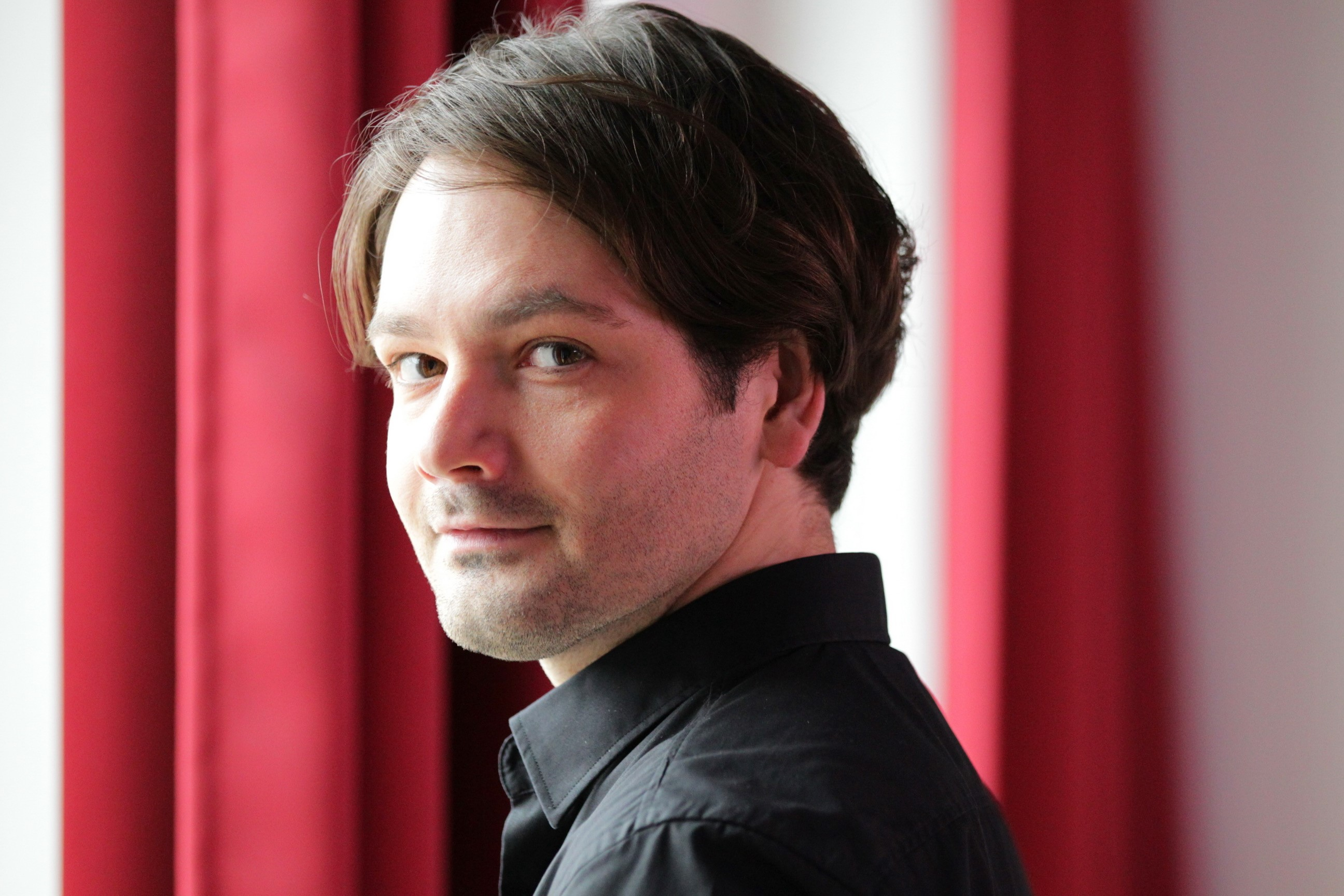
Christian Sturm

Christian Sturm (born 18 January 1978 in Andernach, West Germany) is a German tenor.

== Life ==
He began his training as a singer at the University of music and dramatic arts in Graz, Austria, before moving to the University of music and performing arts in Munich, studying firstly with Helmut Deutsch, Daphne Evangelatos, and Christian Gerhaher.

His operatic début was as Acis in Handels Acis and Galatea on the steps of the Pergamon Altar in Berlin alongside Annette Dasch. He has sung in numerous productions at the Prinzregententheater and Staatstheater am Gärtnerplatz in Munich: Purcell's King Arthur (production: Claus Guth), Handel's Rodrigo – Giuliano – and Britten's A Midsummer Night's Dream – Lysander, Cavallis La Didone – Aeneas, and Belfiore in Mozart's Gärtnerin aus Liebe (production: Christian Pöppelreiter).

As a freelance artist he has performed at the Nationaltheater Weimar, at the Nationaltheater Mannheim, at the Deutsche Oper am Rhein, and the Hessisches Staatstheater Wiesbaden, among others. Sturm is a regular guest at the Wagner Festival in Austria appearing in Tristan und Isolde, Parsifal, Tannhäuser, and Der fliegende Holländer. At the Oper Dortmund as Nerone (L’incoronazione di Poppea), to Basel and Winterthur as Aeneas (Dido and Aeneas), to Stuttgart and Heidelberg as Alfred (Die Fledermaus), and as the First Jew (Salome) to the Israeli Opera, Oper Leipzig, Nationaltheater Mannheim, and Opernhaus Zürich. At the Anhaltisches Theater Dessau, he recently performed as Edrisi (Król Roger) and Andres (Wozzeck). At the Opernhaus Zürich, he also appeared in world premieres of works by Samuel Penderbayne and Jonathan Dove.

His repertoire extends from Agostino Steffani and Johann Simon Mayr to Erich Korngold, as well as the world premiere of operas for the ADevantgarde Festival in Munich and the Opera Wuppertal.

Recordings include Steffani's Stabat Mater and Le Triomphe de la Paix by Pietro Torri, the Richard Strauss adaption of Mozart's Idomeneo as well as several productions for the WDR Köln.

== Roles ==
- Lysander (A Midsummer Night's Dream)
- Tamino (Die Zauberflöte)
- Idamante (Idomeneo)
- Arbace (Idomeneo)
- Belfiore (La finta giardiniera)
- Froh (Das Rheingold)
- Alfred (Die Fledermaus)
- Fuchs (The Little Prince)
- Telemaco (Il ritorno d'Ulisse in patria)
- Acis (Acis and Galatea)
- Giuliano (Rodrigo)
- Sesto (Giulio Cesare)
- Cocle (Die stumme Serenade)
- Aeneas (Dido and Aeneas)
- Aeneas (La Didone)
- Jamie (The Last Five Years)
- Junger Seemann (Tristan und Isolde)
- Ali (L'incontro improvviso)
- Moore of Moore Hall (The Dragon of Wantley)
- Nerone (L'incoronazione di Poppea)
