= Andernach Geyser =

Highest cold-water geyser in the world

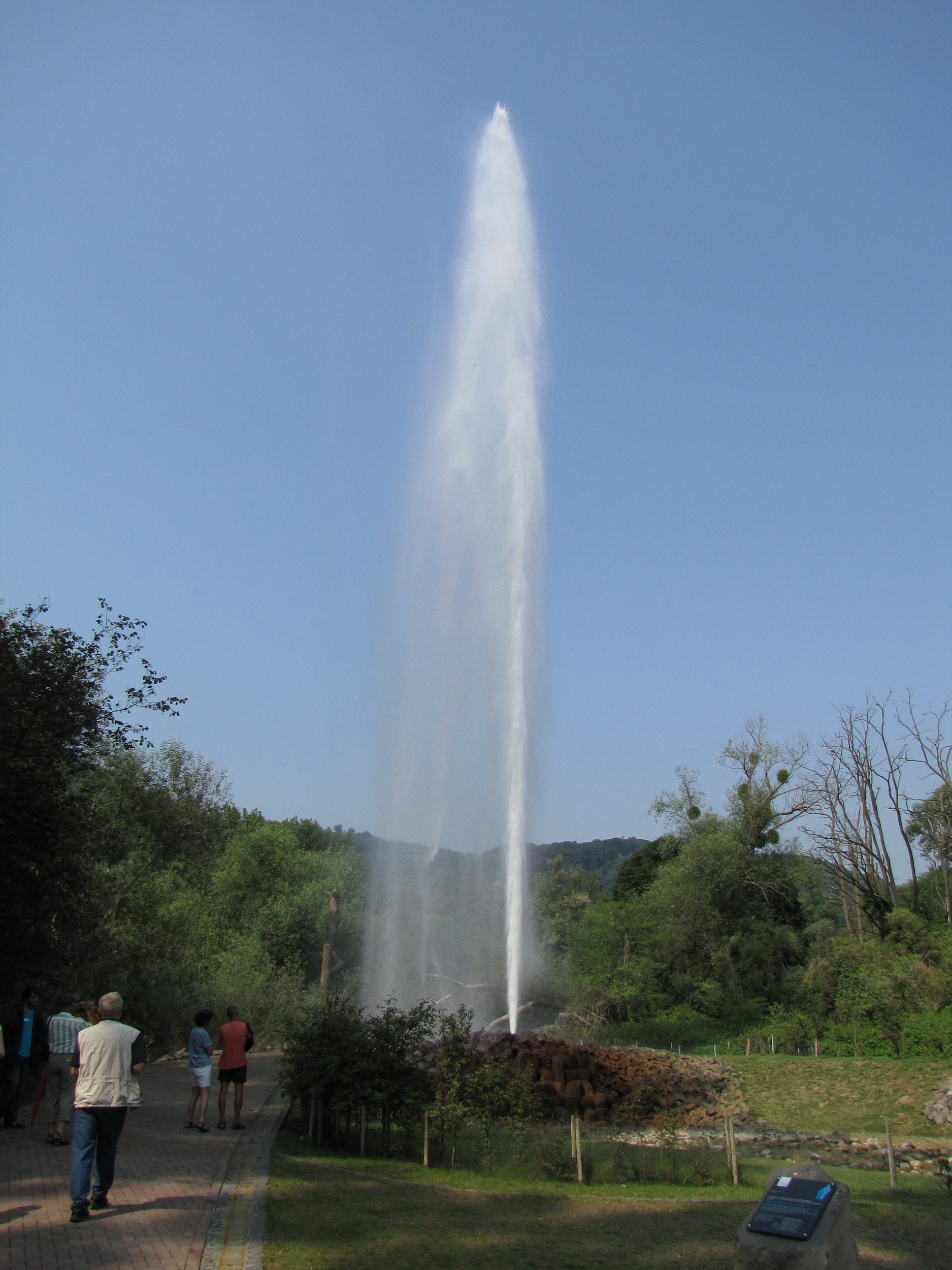
- Eruption of Andernach Geyser in 2009
- Interactive map of Andernach Geyser
- Name origin: Named for Andernach, Germany
- Location: Geopark Vulkanland Eifel, Rhineland-Palatinate, Germany
- Coordinates: 50°26′54″N 7°22′31″E
- Type: Cold-water geyser
- Eruption height: 30 to 60 m (98 to 197 ft)

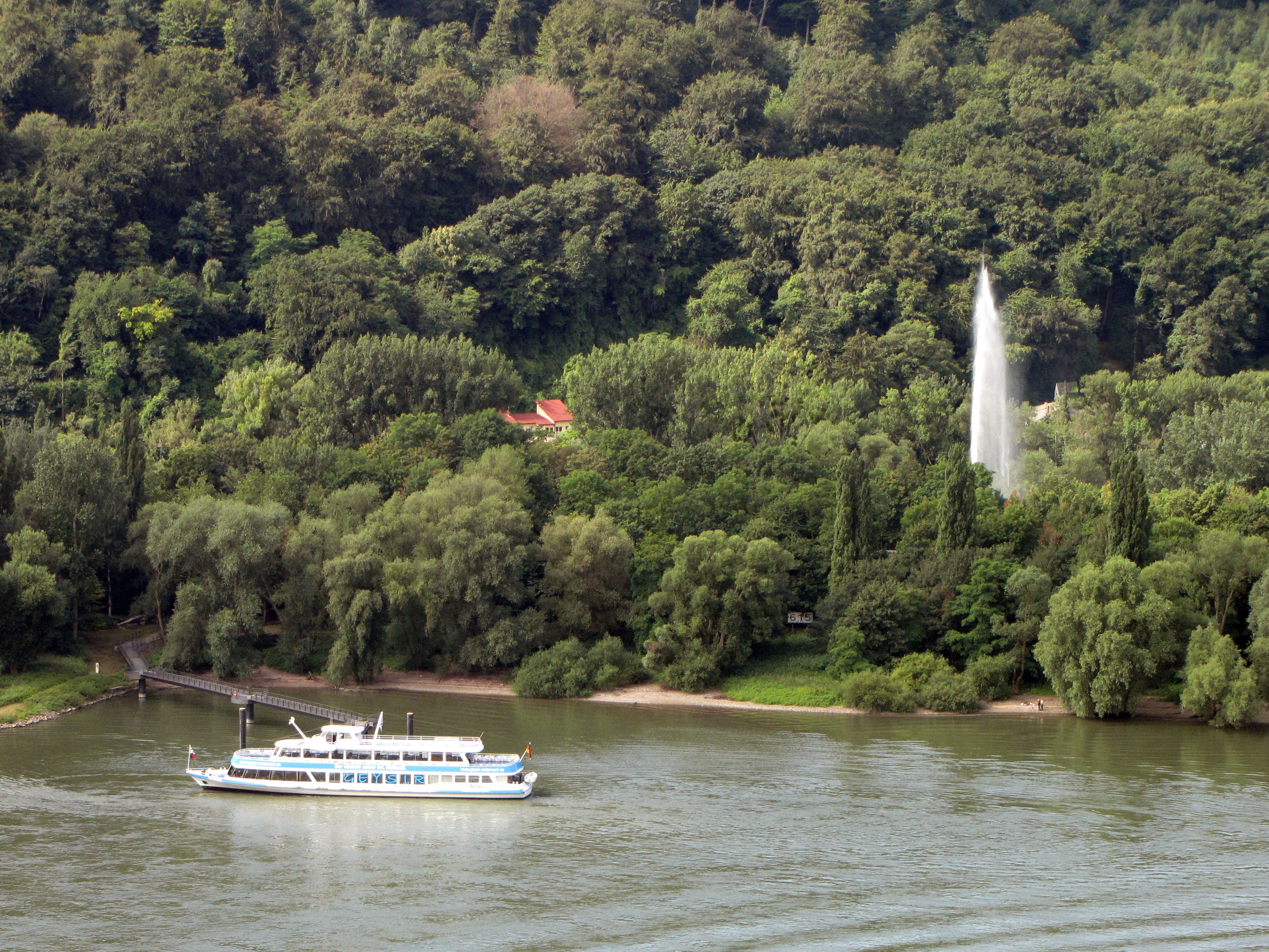
The geyser with the landing stage on the Namedy Peninsula and the ferry, Namedy

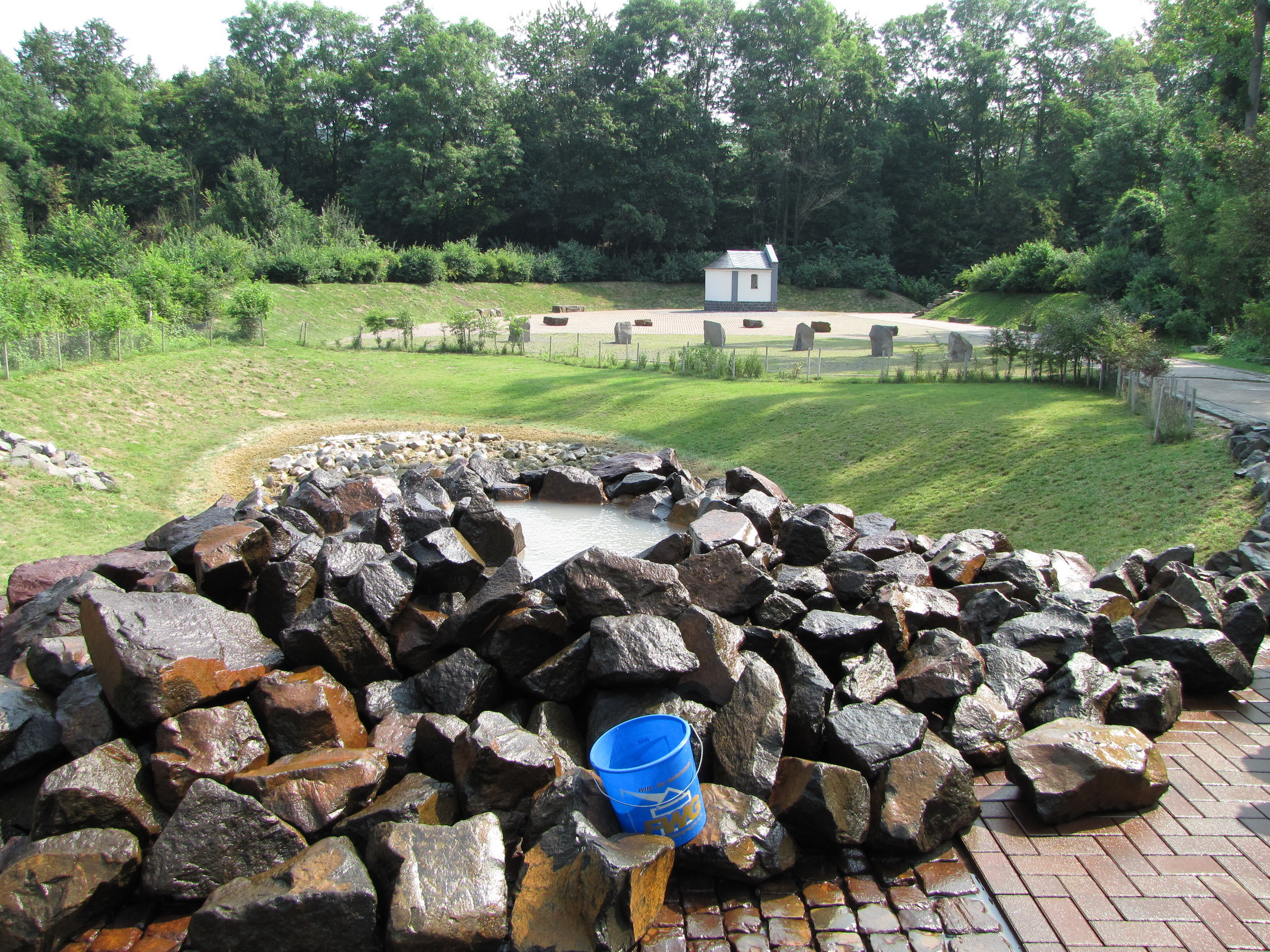
The terrain around Andernach Geyser with the borehole in the foreground

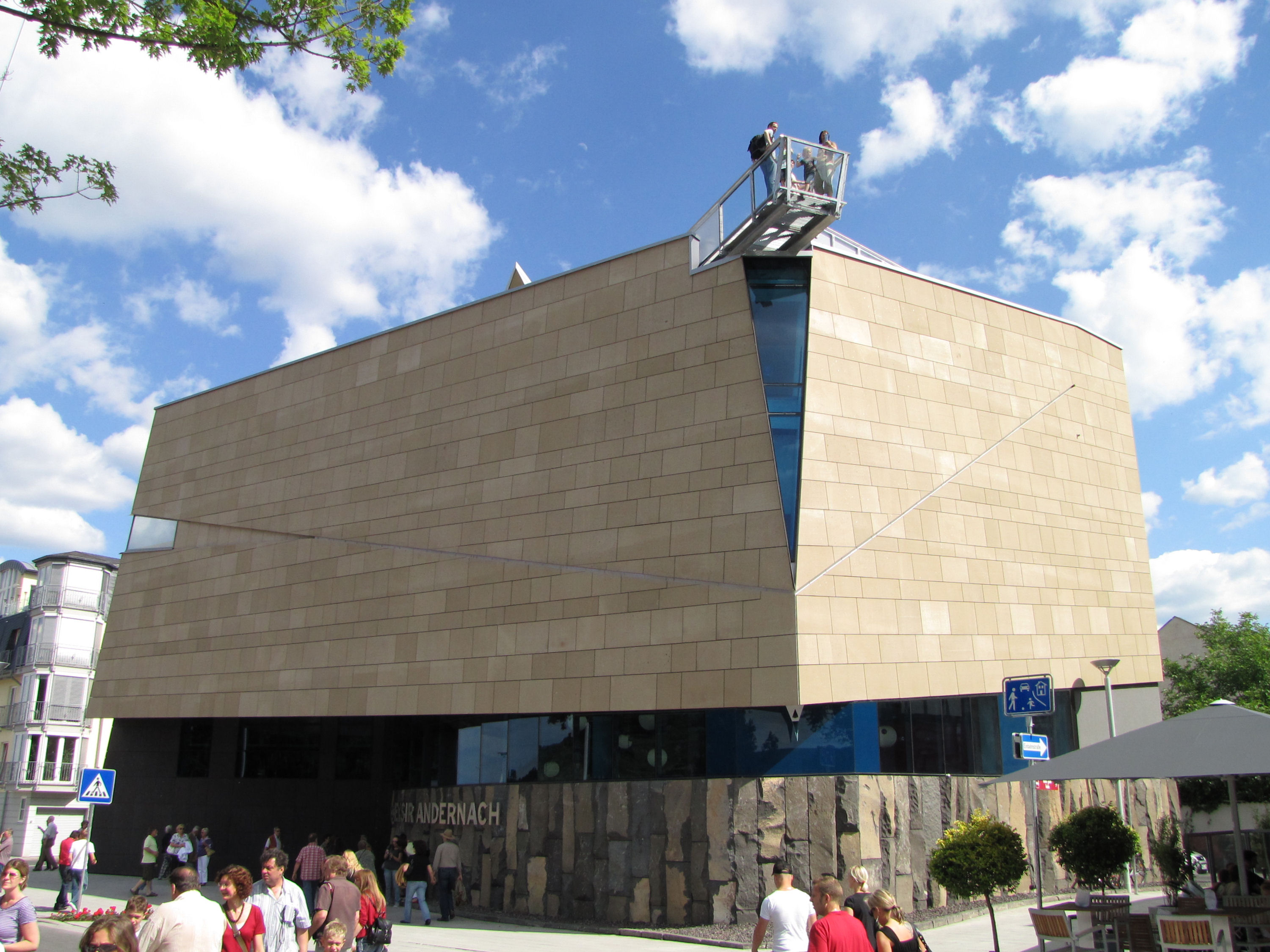
The Geyser experience centre in Andernach on its opening day

Andernach Geyser (German: Geysir Andernach, previously Namedyer Sprudel) is the highest cold-water geyser in the world, reaching heights of 30 to 60 metres. The geyser was first bored in 1903 on the Namedy Peninsula (Namedyer Werth) in the Rhine near Andernach. In 2006 it was turned into a tourist attraction and one of the sights in the volcano park and part of the Geopark Vulkanland Eifel.

== History ==
It is said that in 1903 on the Namedy peninsula, a 343 m deep borehole was drilled into a CO_{2}-containing aquifer to extract carbon dioxide for mineral water. The reason for boring the hole at this location was that CO_{2} gas bubbles were seen rising in the waters of the old Rhine oxbow lake. When the cold-water geyser initially erupted, it leapt to a height of 40 metres. The geyser, and the mineral water it produced, was then called "Namedyer Sprudel" ("Namedy Fizz"). The well was initially intended for producing sparkling mineral water but soon it also became a touristic attraction. For years, the high fountain was a landmark of the Namedy peninsula. The site suffered from significant degradations over the years and in 1957 was put out of operation. Following the upgrade to the B 9 federal highway, the well was closed with a valve in 1967. In the late 1990s, efforts were made to enable the geyser to become a tourist attraction again, but these conflicted with strict conservation obligations to which the area had been subject since 1985.

Ownership of the peninsula went to the town of Andernach in 1990. In 2001, another borehole was drilled into the gas-permeable rock at a new location farther from the road. Even when the first hole was drilled, the geyser jetted back to a height of 40 metres. The well was then fitted with a gate valve again. The Federation for the Environment and Conservation (BUND) presented a case to the Higher Administrative Court of Rhineland-Palatinate to prevent the further development of the geyser for tourism within the nature reserve. In May 2005, the town of Andernach and the BUND settled out of court to allow the geyser to be reactivated under certain conservation conditions and for tourism purposes.

Today, the geyser is fed from a 350-metre-deep artesian well. Since 7 July 2006, the geyser has erupted regularly. At night it is closed with a valve for safety reasons, but it is allowed to erupt during the day. Access to the nature reserve used to be possible in only a few guided boat trips, booked in advance, on certain summer weekends. In summer 2008, 33 boat tours were operated. A much wider tourist attraction was established with the opening of the Andernach Geyser Adventure Centre (Erlebniszentrum Geysir Andernach) on 29 May 2009 with a trip to the geyser in the river cruiser and ferry, Namedy. The boat was christened during the celebrations. In the tourist visitor centre, there is information about the geyser.

On 9 November 2008, the Andernach Geyser was officially recorded in the Guinness Book of Records as the highest cold-water geyser in the world.
