= Antwerp songbook =

1544 songbook by Jan Roulans

The Antwerp songbook (Dutch: Antwerps liedboek and on the cover Een schoon liedekens. Boeck inden welcken ghy in vinden sult. Veelderhande liedekens (A nice songbook in which you will find several songs)) was published in Antwerp in 1544 by printer Jan Roulans.

== History ==
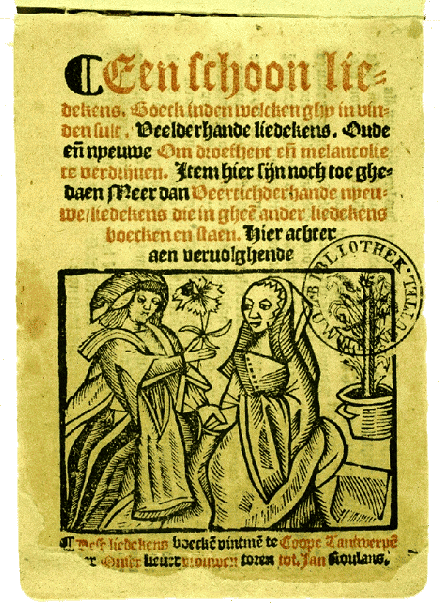
Frontispiece of the Antwerp songbook (1544)

The songbook includes lyrics of some 221 'old' and 'new' Dutch songs (Oude en nyeuwe) to banish sadness and melancholy (Om droefheyt ende melancolie te verdrijuen), with reference to the tune to which it was sung but without any musical notation.

At least five editions of the songbook are known: folios from two probably older editions survived as reinforcement of the cover of other books while the structure of the preserved copy implicates that two earlier editions have existed. Thus, only one edition is preserved in one copy only, collected by Duke August von Braunschweig-Wolfenbüttel and conserved in the Herzog August Bibliothek (the library also known as Bibliotheca Augusta) in Wolfenbüttel. One copy likely survived because two years after publication, this songbook was listed in the Index Librorum Prohibitorum, the index of forbidden literature of the Catholic Church's infamous Inquisition. The printer died later on in prison, where he was held because of having printed clandestine literature—not particularly the political songs, in favour of the House of Habsburg, but rather the songs about depraved and licentious monks and nuns which might have disturbed the Inquisition. The few copies left in the Netherlands after the songbook was listed in the index were likely destroyed by French librarians eager to rid every trace of Flemish culture in the Southern Netherlands.

The only copy left of the small booklet was discovered in the library of Wolfenbüttel by Heinrich Hoffmann von Fallersleben who also provided the first modern edition in 1855. Recently a more complete edition of the songbook, with the tunes referred to in some 142 songs and found in other songbooks of the period, was published in 2004 with a double CD by Camerata Trajectina.

The Antwerp songbook is the first printed large collection of Dutch songs known to have survived the centuries. Many songs had been transmitted through oral tradition since the end of the Middle Ages: in those cases, the tune was referred to as an oudt liedeken, an old song. Many songs, printed for the first time in the Antwerp songbook, had by that time been known for centuries and were included in several songbooks and anthologies.

The songs reflect life in the cosmopolitan port town Antwerp in the 16th century. Some songs, for instance, are Dutch versions of German songs while others were sung to French tunes. They give a varied impression of a lively community, with a good deal of courting and drinking taking place, as well as featuring songs by people who cared for their freedom of speech.

== Principal source ==
- Het Antwerps liedboek, edition by Dieuwke E. van der Poel, Dirk Geirnaert, Hermina Joddersma and Johan Oosterman, reconstruction of the tunes by Louis Peter Grijp, published by Uitgeverij Lannoo & Delta, Tielt, 2004 ISBN 90-209-5523-3 (inf. Deltareeks.nl)

== Discography ==
- Antwerps liedboek, by the Paul Rans Ensemble, directed by Paul Rans, 1993, label Eufoda 1183
- The Antwerp Songbook, by Camerata Trajectina, directed by Louis Peter Grijp, 2004, label Globe 6058
