= Vulkanland Eifel Geopark =

Coordinates: 50.17708°N 6.847892°E

The Vulkanland Eifel Geopark (German: Geopark Vulkanland Eifel) is a German national geopark in the Volcanic Eifel region that was established on 19 April 2005. Covering an area of 2,200 km^{2}, the geopark extends from the Belgian border in the west over the Eifel mountains to the River Rhine in the east. The countryside here which has been shaped by the volcanism of the past contains numerous maars, cinder cones, lava flows, lava domes, calderas, and bubbling springs. The largest caldera was formed by the Laacher See volcano that last erupted about 13,000 years ago. A sign of continuing volcanic activity in this region are the volcanic gases that are still visibly being discharged into the atmosphere.

== Literature ==
- Karl-Heinz Schumacher und Wilhelm Meyer: Geopark Vulkanland Eifel. Lava-Dome und Lavakeller in Mendig. Redaktion: Karl Peter Wiemer. Rheinischer Verein für Denkmalpflege und Landschaftsschutz, Cologne, 2006 (=Rheinische Landschaften, Heft 57).
- Werner d´Hein: Nationaler Geopark Vulkanland Eifel. Ein Natur- und Kulturführer. Gaasterland-Verlag, Düsseldorf, 2006, ISBN 3-935873-15-8
