= Gerhard Paul =

German historian

- Born: 1951 (age 74–75); Biedenkopf, Hesse, West Germany
- Occupation: Historian

Academic background
- Education: GhK
- Thesis: (1984)

Academic work
- Era: 20th century
- Discipline: History
- Sub-discipline: Visual history
- Website: gerhardpaul.de

Gerhard Paul (born 1951, in Biedenkopf) is a German historian and retired (2016) professor of the University of Flensburg.

== Awards and recognition ==
- 2005: International book award for the year of 2004 in the category "Neueste Geschichte" ("Recent History") from H-Soz-u-Kult for Bilder des Krieges − Krieg der Bilder. Die Visualisierung des modernen Krieges. (Images of War - War of Images. The visualization of modern war.)
- 2009: First place in the September 2009 list of recommended books of the humanities, cultural and social sciences (by Süddeutsche Zeitung and Norddeutscher Rundfunk) for the atlas he edited: Das Jahrhundert der Bilder. Band 1: Bildatlas 1900 bis 1949, Band 2: Bildatlas 1949 bis heute. Vandenhoeck & Ruprecht

== Books ==
- Aufstand der Bilder. Die NS–Propaganda vor 1933. Bonn 1990. ISBN 3-8012-5015-6
- (with Erich Koch) Staatlicher Terror und gesellschaftliche Verrohung. Die Gestapo in Schleswig-Holstein. Ergebnisse-Verlag, Hamburg 1996, ISBN 3-87916-037-6.
- „Landunter!“ Schleswig-Holstein und das Hakenkreuz. Aufsätze. Westfälisches Dampfboot, Münster 2001, ISBN 3-89691-507-X.
- (with Bettina Goldberg) Matrosenanzug, Davidstern. Bilder jüdischen Lebens aus der Provinz, Neumünster, Wachholtz, 2002, ISBN 3-529-06144-1
- Bilder des Krieges – Krieg der Bilder. Die Visualisierung des modernen Krieges. Schöningh, Paderborn 2004; ISBN 3-506-71739-1. Fink, München; ISBN 3-7705-4053-0.
- Der Bilderkrieg. Inszenierungen, Bilder und Perspektiven der „Operation Irakische Freiheit“, Wallstein, Göttingen 2005, ISBN 3-89244-980-5.

In addition to monographs, he was also an editor of a number of books in history.
