= Cold-water geyser =

Natural explosive eruption of cold water

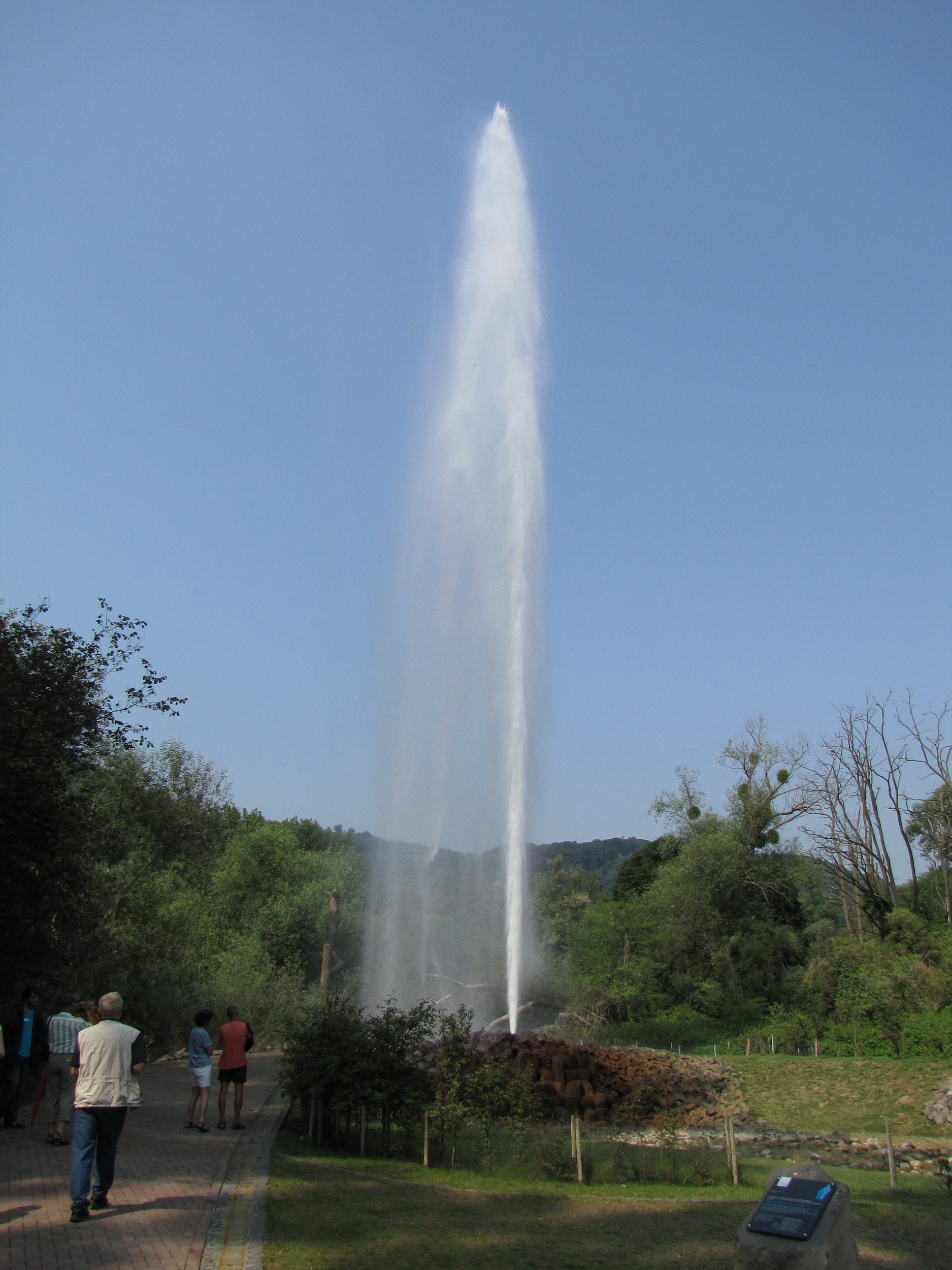
Andernach Geyser, (Germany), the world's highest cold-water geyser

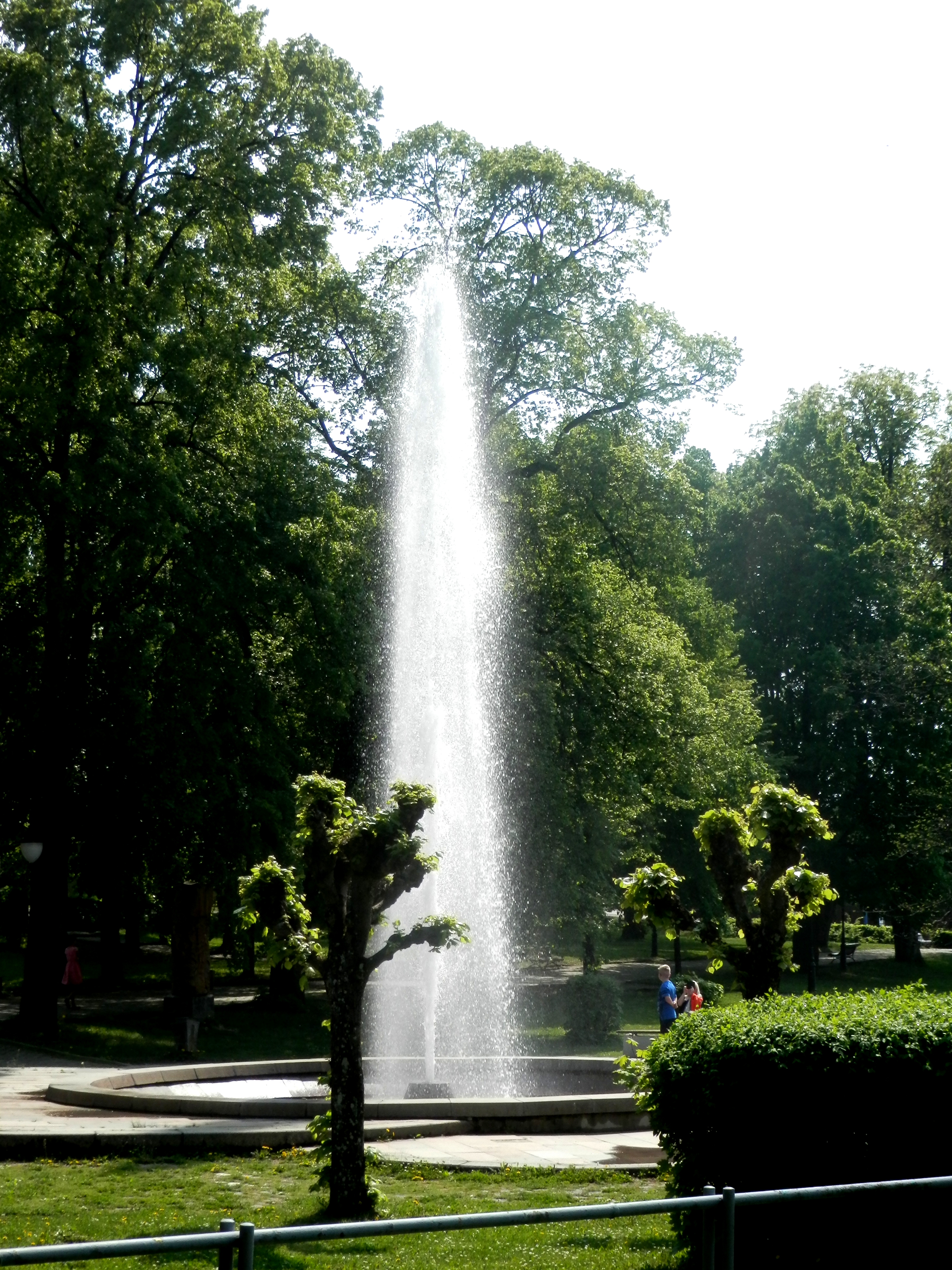
Herľany, (Slovakia), first eruption in 1870

Cold-water geysers are geysers that have eruptions whose water spurts are propelled by CO_{2} bubbles, instead of the hot steam which drives the more familiar hot-water geysers: The gush of a cold-water geyser is identical to the spurt from a freshly-opened bottle of soda pop. Cold-water geysers look quite similar to their steam-driven counterparts; however, their CO_{2}-laden water often appears whiter and more frothy.

== Mechanism ==
In cold-water geysers, the supply of CO_{2}-laden water lies confined in an aquifer, in which water and CO_{2} are trapped by less permeable overlying strata. The more familiar hot-water geysers derive the energy for their eruptions from the proximity to (relatively) near-surface magma. In contrast, whereas cold water geysers might also derive their supply of CO_{2} from magmatic sources, by definition of "cold-water", they do not also obtain sufficient heat to provide steam pressure, and their eruptions are propelled only by the pressure of dissolved CO_{2}. The magnitude and frequency of such eruptions depend on various factors such as plumbing depth, CO_{2} concentrations and refresh rate, aquifer water yield, etc.

The water and its load of CO_{2} powering a cold-water geyser can escape the rock strata overlying its aquifer only through weak segments of rock, like faults, joints, or drilled wells. A borehole drilled for a well, for example, can unexpectedly provide an escape route for the pressurized water and CO_{2} to reach the surface. The column of water rising through the rock exerts enough pressure on the gaseous CO_{2} so that it remains in the water as dissolved gas or small bubbles. When the pressure decreases due to the widening of a fissure, the CO_{2} bubbles expand, and that expansion displaces the water above and causes the eruption.

== Examples ==
Cold-water geyser Wallender Born (Germany)

- Herľany geyser, Slovakia
- Andernach Geyser (a.k.a. Namedyer Sprudel), Germany
- Wallender Born (a.k.a. Brubbel), Germany
- Crystal Geyser, near Green River, Utah
- Caxambu, Brazil
- Sivá Brada, Slovakia
- Wehr Geyser Germany

== See also ==
- Limnic eruption
- Soda geyser
