= Monrepos (archaeology) =

German archaeological research centre and museum

Coordinates: 50°28′52″N 7°26′35″E

Monrepos Archaeological Research Center and Museum for Human Behavioral Evolution
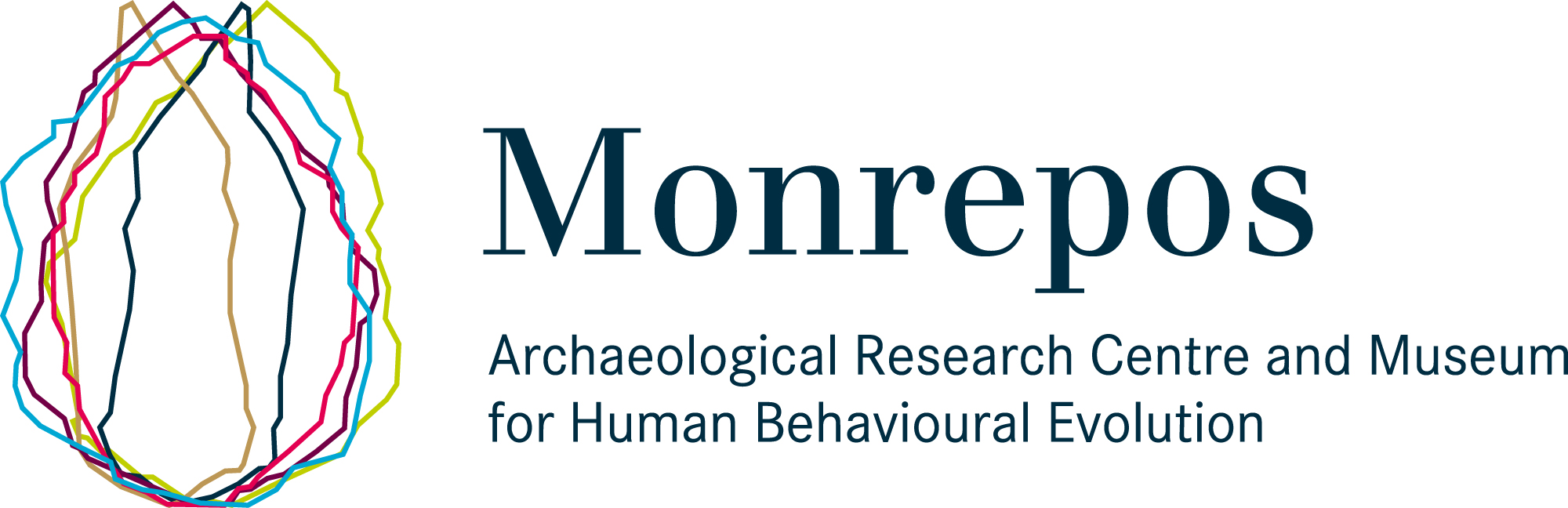
- Established: 1984
- Location: Schloss Monrepos, 56567 Neuwied
- Director: Sabine Gaudzinski-Windheuser
- Website: http://monrepos-rgzm.de/

Monrepos is an archaeological research centre and a museum of human behavioural evolution located in Germany, at Schloss Monrepos in the city of Neuwied. The development of modern human behaviour in the Palaeolithic and Mesolithic is studied at the research centre and the findings of these studies are conveyed to the public in the museum. Monrepos is one of the leading institutions for the research of early human history.

== Structure ==
Monrepos is part of the Römisch-Germanisches Zentralmuseum (Romano-Germanic Central Museum, known as RGZM), which is a member of the Leibniz Association.

Another provider for Monrepos is Prinz Maximilian zu Wied-Stiftung, supported by the Förderkreis Altsteinzeit e.V., which assists with research, teaching and the publication of research.

Monrepos collaborates closely with the Institute for Prehistoric Archaeology of the Johannes Gutenberg University of Mainz.

== Location ==
Monrepos (French: "my rest") is a historical recreation area located on the hills above the town of Neuwied in a transition zone between the Middle Rhine valley and the Westerwald. In the extensive forests of Monrepos several long-distance hiking trails cross such as the Rheinsteig, the Rheinhöhenweg Trail, and a trail along the remains of the limes—the frontier and border defences of the Roman Empire. The previous summer residence of the princes of Wied is today the centre of an ensemble of historic buildings from the 18th and 19th century.

== History ==
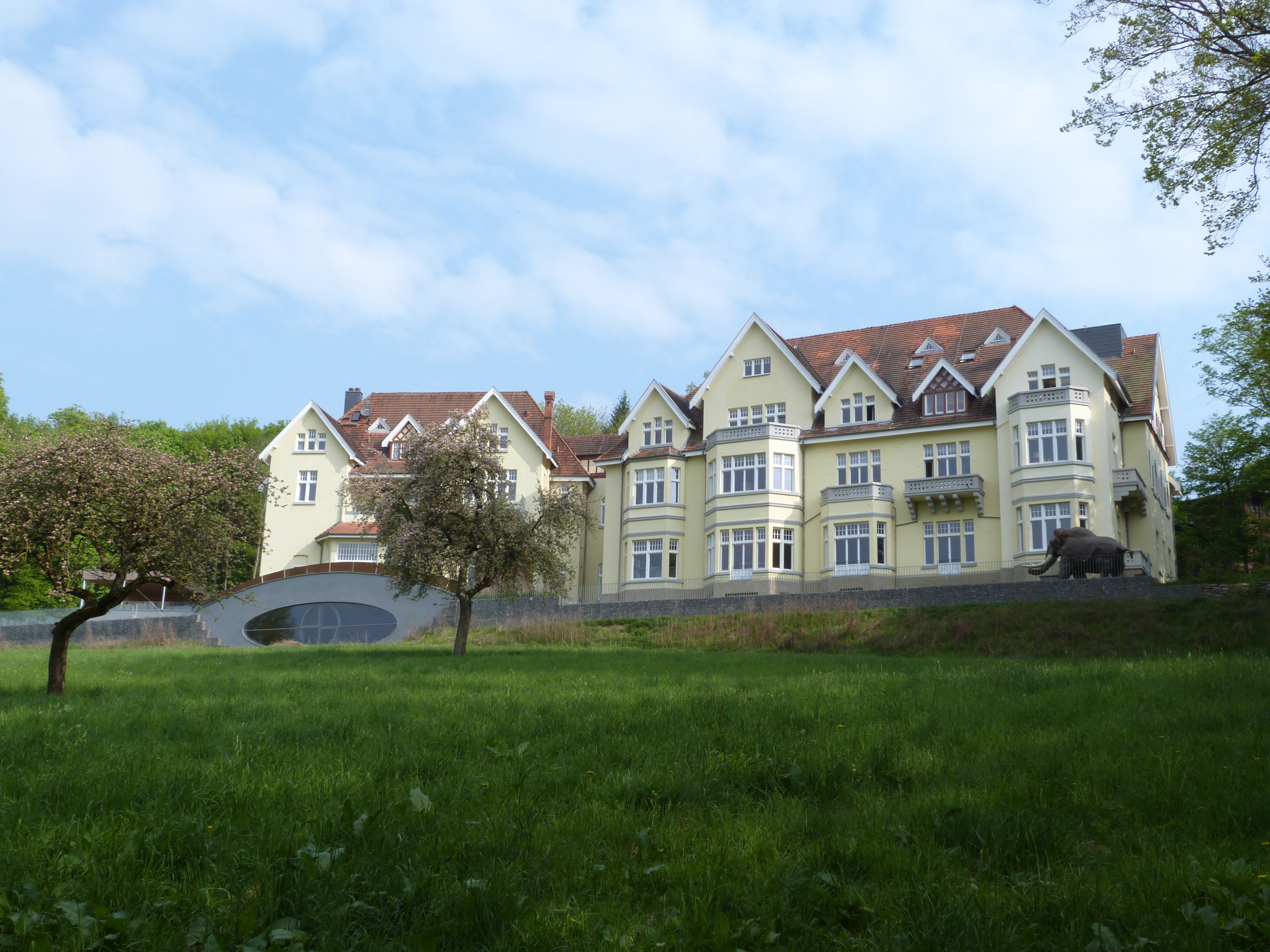
Monrepos after finished reconstruction works in 2013

Until 2012, Monrepos was named "Research Unit Palaeolithic“ (Forschungsbereich Altsteinzeit) of the RGZM and "Museum for Ice Age Archaeology“ (Museum für die Archäologie des Eiszeitalters). The Forschungsbereich Altsteinzeit was formed in 1984, following the discovery of major Paleolithic sites in the Neuwied Basin including Niederbieber, Gönnersdorf, and Bad Breisig.

In 1988, the Forschungsbereich and Museum moved to Schloss Monrepos, which in 1986 had joined the foundation of the Prince Maximilian of Wied

Manrepos was founded by Gerhard Bosinski, professor of prehistoric archaeology at the University of Cologne and head of the Forschungsbereich Altsteinzeit. In 2003, Sabine Gaudzinski-Windheuser, a professor in the Institute of Prehistory and Early History at the University of Mainz, was named head of Monrepos.

== Temporal and geographic frame of research ==
The research at Monrepos encompasses the early human history of the Old World from its beginnings to the invention and spread of agriculture and stock farming. During the 1980s and early 1990s, the studies focused particularly on the rich archaeological sites from the Neuwied basin and its vicinity. The Lower Palaeolithic site at Miesenheim is approximately 600,000 years old and among the oldest settlement sites in Central Europe. Sites in former volcano craters in the eastern Eifel such as the Schweinskopf, the "Wannen“ volcano group, the Tönchesberg, and the Plaidter Hummerich are worldwide the only settlement sites of this type inhabited by Neanderthals.

Important sites of the Magdalenian cultures were excavated and studied at Andernach-Martinsberg and Gönnersdorf. Many sites studied at Monrepos such as Niederbieber, Bad Breisig, Kettig, Urbar, and the upper horizons of Andernach-Martinsberg were attributed to the Federmesser culture which were similar in behavioural development to the French Azilian if the late Ice Age. The sites were unusually well-preserved, due to being covered by tephra from the Laacher See volcanic eruption, and their discovery allowed for new scholarly insights into prehistoric land-use.

Monrepos began to cooperate on international projects in the 1990s, including the Ubeidiya prehistoric site and Gesher Benot Ya'aqov in Israel. In Dmanisi in Georgia, Monrepos has excavated a site which yielded some of the oldest hominid remains found in Eurasia. More recent work in Romania examined some of the oldest sites in Eastern Europe. Research at Taforalt in Morocco examined the behaviour of early modern humans and recovered shell jewelry dated to 82,000 years Before Present.

Mesolithic sites such as Duvensee and Bedburg-Königshoven are some of the "youngest" studied by Monrepos.

== Guiding principle of research ==
The research and the conveying of its results aim at understanding the essential behavioural characteristics of modern humans and the development of these characteristics during the Palaeolithic and Mesolithic periods from 2.5 Million years to approximately 7,500 years ago.

Monrepos is among the few archaeological research institutions which are guided by an own principle of research. This principle defines the objectives of research and the strategy necessary to achieve these objectives. The principle of research is based on an integrative, holistic understanding of science. Thereby, it merges the traditional dichotomy of Social and Natural Sciences. Different sources of evidence and variable contexts are connected diachronically in the principle of research. They are pooled in three research units: "time slices“, "strategies”and “social organisation”. "Time slices“ relates to the group of questions of where, when, and in which frame of references human behaviour evolved. The research units "strategies“ and "social organisation“ try to identify survival strategies and behavioural patterns as well as their social embedding. The research principle is oriented diachronically and perspectively. That means that the research is systematically looking at different time periods and levels of resolution. Large frames allow for an orientation, whereas more detailed frames allow for a punctually high resolution. By the use of a synthetic comparison of the three research units and the comparative transfer between the different time periods and levels of resolution, it is possible to reconstruct the development of human behaviour in the Palaeolithic and Mesolithic.

== Research foci ==
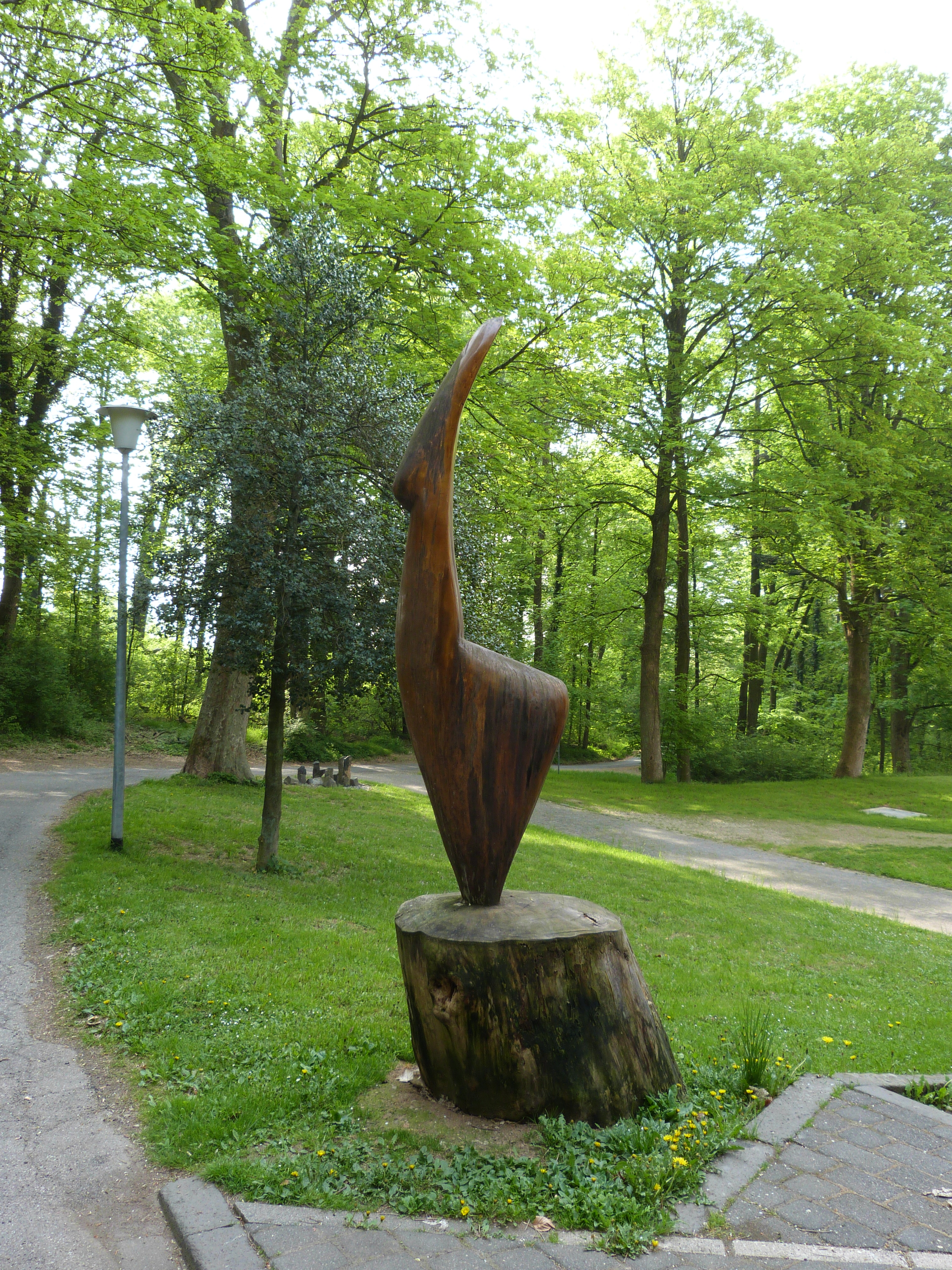
Sculpture of a Gönnersdorf venus figurine

Particularly relevant research foci in the study of the behavioural development of early humans and hominids are the processes relating to subsistence patterns, mobility, settlement behaviour, and land-use patterns of Palaeolithic and Mesolithic hunter-gatherers.

=== Calibration and dating programmes ===
Since the mid-1980s, Monrepos has been involved in the construction and improvement of an absolute chronology of the European Palaeolithic. In this process, comprehensive dating programs of the Upper Palaeolithic were initiated. Innovative methods of radiocarbon calibration were developed by Olaf Jöris (Monrepos) and Bernhard Weninger (University of Cologne). These methods improved the precise calibration of increasingly older radiocarbon dates integrating high-resolution climate data. The calibration program CalPal is based on this approach and was first created by Olaf Jöris and Bernhard Weninger in the mid-1990s.

=== Subsistence ===
Hunting of big game is an important ability in the development of early hominid subsistence. Monrepos has set an international standard in the study of hominid hunting by the use of an elaborated set of archaeozoological methods and a diachronic perspective. For instance, big game hunting by early hominids and its evolutionary relevance was demonstrated for the first time in the archaeological record by a member of Monrepos

Currently, the research mainly focuses on Neanderthals' hunting behaviour in the context of land use. This behaviour is examined particularly in cave sites such as the Balve cave or the Moravian Kůlna Cave and at the largest Middle Palaeolithic open-air site in Neumark-Nord.

Further research projects relating to subsistence concentrate on the late Ice age and the early Holocene. Studies from concentrations at the Mesolithic site of Duvensee were the first to show the significance of vegetation resources such as hazelnuts in the early Holocene subsistence.

=== Settlement behaviour ===
The investigation and analysis of the evolution of settlement and land use behaviour represent another research focus at Monrepos. Since its inception the systematic analysis of extensively-excavated open-air sites and settlement structures has always been a focus at Monrepos. Current research involves the application of GIS-supported geostatistical approaches that allow for quantitative and verifiable analyses of settlement dynamics.

The wide spectrum of investigated sites allows for a diachronic comparison of settlement and land-use behaviours and their links with environmental change and socioeconomic factors. Current projects involve the sites of Neumark-Nord, Bilizingsleben, Niederbieber, Breitenbach, Magdalena cave, Gönnersdorf, Andernach, Oelknitz and Duvensee.

=== Art ===
The analytic-integrative approach to Palaeolithic art is another defining feature of work at Monrepos that was developed with the discovery and investigation of the famous engraved slate plaquettes of the Magdalenian culture in Gönnersdorf, which demonstrate that art was a major component in the Palaeolithic of Central Europe and that Gönnersdorf-type Venus figurines represent a major category in art history. Methodology at Monrepos is characterised by a contextualised approach that aims to understand the principles and rules behind patterns in design and production. The Magdalenian plaquettes have undergone a detailed 3-D analysis.

=== Experimental archaeology ===
Since the 1980s, experimental archaeology studies of prehistoric hunting techniques, the processing of carcasses, and taphonomy have been conducted in Monrepos under laboratory conditions.

== Education and promotion of young scientists ==
Members of Monrepos regularly give lectures and seminars about the evolution of human behaviour in the Palaeolithic and Mesolithic at the Institute of Prehistory and Early History at the University of Mainz. The archaeological education is supplemented by internships, excursions, and field schools, allowing for direct participation in science and conveying. Junior scientists are promoted individually by a mentoring programme and also financially by scholarships such as the Prince Maximilian of Wied-scholarship.

== Museum ==
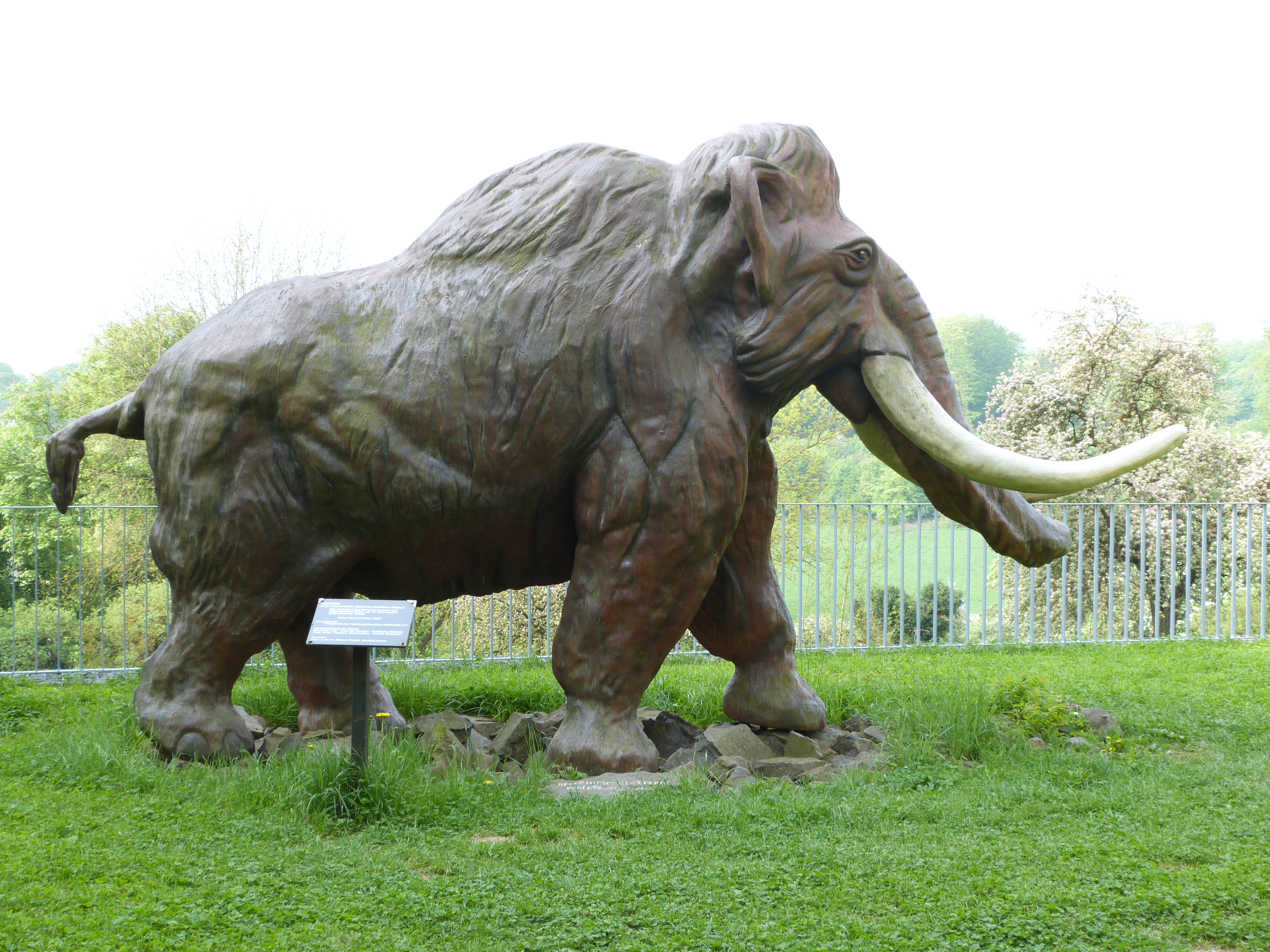
The mammoth sculpture 'Max' outside Monrepos

The permanent exhibition presents the results of archaeological research into the origins and early evolution of human behaviour.

== Outreach ==
In addition to the Museum and its teaching involvement at the Institute for Pre- and Early History at Mainz University, Monrepos has also developed other formats of public outreach. The Rudolf Virchow lecture is one of the most longstanding public archaeological lectures in Germany. This annual event honours the accomplishments of an eminent researcher in the field of Palaeolithic archaeology, who presents the results of his or her research in a popular lecture held at Neuwied castle.

The “SteinZeitReise” (“Trip to the Stone Age”) is an annual hands-on event held at Monrepos. Staff demonstrate various aspects of Palaeolithic life and the public is invited to try out knapping, using a spear-thrower, and archaeological excavation. Special exhibits connect art of the Upper Paleolithic with modern art and current affairs.

== Collections ==
=== Osteological collection ===
The comparative osteology collection is primarily of animal specimens, complemented by a small inventory of human remains. The faunal inventory consists primarily of European Ice Age fauna and their extant representatives. In addition to large mammals such as mammoth, rhino, bison, and horse, the collection includes remains of extant smaller mammals and birds. The taphonomic collection includes modern and archaeological materials which exhibit various pathologies and show signatures of specific taphonomic processes and agents, as well as experimentally modified bone.

=== Lithic raw material collection ===
The lithic material collection includes samples of flint, which served as raw material for the production of artefacts during the Middle and Upper Palaeolithic. The collection houses approximately 230 samples from various sites, with the majority of samples coming from the Rhineland.

=== Collection of archaeological artefacts ===
The artefact collection is made up of approximately 4500 artefacts from the Middle and Upper Palaeolithic. Specimens include both recovered pieces and replicas fashioned by the restoration department at the RGZM. An important component of the artefact collection is the Venus figurine archive, with over 50 specimens.

The collection includes originals and replicas of all female figurines known from the Mid-Upper Palaeolithic. The artefact collection also houses engraved schist plaquettes from Gönnersdorf and figurines from the early and late Upper Palaeolithic.

== Library ==
The library at Monrepos contains more than 70,000 titles on Palaeolithic and Mesolithic archaeology. It is complemented by a comprehensive collection of special editions and an electronic database of periodicals.

== Literature ==
- Bosinski, Gerhard (1988). "Eiszeitsiedlungen vom Bims konserviert. Die Entstehungsgeschichte des Museums für Archäologie des Eiszeitalters in Monrepos". Westerwald. 81: 185–187.
- Street, Martin (1995). "The Forschungsbereich Altsteinzeit des Römisch-Germanischen Zentralmuseums, Mainz". Newsletter of the Osteoarchaeological Research Group. 9: 7–10.
- Hannelore Bosinski: 15 Jahre Museum für die Archäologie des Eiszeitalters. Eine ganz persönliche Rückschau. In: Heimatjahrbuch des Landkreises Neuwied. 2005, S. 53–60.
- Sabine Gaudzinski-Windheuser, Olaf Jöris (Hrsg.): 600.000 Jahre Menschheitsgeschichte in der Mitte Europas. Begleitbuch zur Ausstellung im Museum für die Archäologie des Eiszeitalters, Schloss Monrepos, Neuwied. Verlag des Römisch-Germanischen Zentralmuseums, Mainz 2006, ISBN 9783795419684.

== Human Roots Award ==
The Human Roots Award is a €10,000 prize recognising "outstanding impact or great influence in understanding the archaeology of our behavioural evolution". It was established by Monrepos in 2017 and endowed by a private donor. The inaugural prize was awarded to evolutionary biologist Richard Dawkins in a ceremony at Monrepos schloss.
