= Niederbieber (Palaeolithic site) =

- Location within Germany
- 50°25′43″N 7°27′41″E
- Periods: Upper Paleolithic
- Cultures: Federmesser culture
- Location: Neuwied, Rheinland-Pfalz, Germany
- Region: Middle Rhine

The archaeological site Niederbieber is an important representative of the Federmesser culture. Dating to the end of the Pleistocene, the site is one of the most extensively excavated archaeological sites dating to the late Upper Palaeolithic. Finds and features are extraordinarily well preserved as the site was protected by fallout from the Laacher See volcanic eruption approximately 12,900 years ago. Comprehensive archaeological studies have provided a detailed view of activities and settlement dynamics of hunter-gatherer groups at the end of the ice age.

== Location ==
The site is located in Germany's Middle Rhine region at the north-eastern edge of the Neuwied basin within Neuwied's district Niederbieber.

== Discovery and history of research ==
The site was discovered in 1980 during pumice mining conducted in the area. Volcanic pumice was deposited during a major eruption of the Laacher See volcano, which according to recent dating occurred approximately 12,900 years ago. Over the course of a few days the pumice deposits, measuring up to 40 metres in thickness near the crater, sealed-in the late glacial Allerød landscape of the Neuwied basin, thus preserving the archaeology. Evidence of the massive Laacher See volcano eruption, which most likely took place during spring/early summer, can be found the form of tephra all over northern and Central Europe and is used by geologists and archaeologists as a chronostratigraphic marker.

At Niederbieber the pumice layer measured approximately 1m in thickness under which several scatters of burned and unburned artefacts were encountered. Extensive excavations of an area almost covering 1000m^{2} were conducted between 1981 and 1988 and again between 1996 and 1999 by MONREPOS Archaeological Research Centre and Museum for Human Behavioural Evolution of the Romano-Germanic-Centralmuseum Mainz and the State Office for Preservation of Historical Monuments Coblence.

== Dating the site ==
The human activities at Niederbieber have been dated by various approaches that have delivered matching results. The human occupations appear to predate the Laacher See volcanic eruption (12,900 years ago) by several years or decades.

- The finds and features lie on top of a late-glacial surface, directly underneath the pumice deposits which provide a terminus ante quem for the human activities. The archaeology must therefore predate the volcanic eruption 12,900 years ago.
- Radiocarbon dating with bone samples from areas II and III have produced (calibrated) ages of up to 13,100 years.
- The backed points from Niederbieber conform to the typologies known from the Allerød along the Middle Rhine and can thus be used as a relative-chronologic marker

== Notable finds and features ==
An arrow shaft smoother made of red sandstone was discovered during the excavation of area II in 1981. The object is engraved (see below) and measures 71 × 34 × 22mm. Both in terms of function and artistic expression, the arrow smoother is one of the most superb finds from Niederbieber. Arrow shaft smoothers are characteristic tool types of the Federmesser culture. They were used in pairs and also serve as indirect evidence for the increasing reliance on bow and arrow. In the case of Niederbieber, the presence of the arrow smoother indicates manufacture or repair of hunting weapons.

The unusual decoration of the arrow smoother with a stylised woman figure of the Gönnersdorf type is a rare example of artistic expressions dating to this period. Stylistically the engraving is a continuation of the engravings of women known from the Magdalenian site Gönnersdorf (located about 15 km northwest of Niederbieber) and thus serves as example for the continuation of this particular tradition in the region.

The finds from Niederbieber are on display at MONREPOS Archaeological Research Centre and Museum for Human Behavioural Evolution of the Romano-Germanic-Centralmuseum Mainz in Neuwied.

== Results of archaeological analyses ==
The results of comprehensive studies have yielded detailed information about the life of hunter-gatherer groups at the end of the Pleistocene as well as providing information about late glacial climate and the environment.

Faunal remains, including Elk, red deer, horse, wild boar and beaver indicate a moderate, wet, atlantic climate. Botanical remains of birch, willow, populus, spruce and pinesuggest an open forest landscape.

20 discrete finds concentrations in similar stratigraphic position were recorded at Niederbieber. These concentrations are made up of lithic tools, by-products of their manufacture as well as faunal remains. Using artefact analysis and GIS analyses of the find distributions, these concentrations are currently interpreted as ephemeral working areas of late glacial hunter-gatherer groups.

All find concentrations are spatially discrete units separated from one another, with decreasing find density towards the periphery of the excavated area. Spatial analyses show the recurrence of similar arrangements of these concentrations in respect to one another. At least two opposite concentrations are separated by an artefact-poor area. These artefact-poor areas are characterised by the presence burned bone and flint. They are currently interpreted as unpreserved, ephemeral hearths. Several re-fits of stone artefacts from different concentrations show that these working areas were contemporaneous and existed next to one another.

Among the lithic artefacts backed points dominate over scrapers and burins. Backed points are interpreted as projectile points that were affixed to arrow shafts using birch tar.

The various lithic raw materials that were used for the production of stone tools were acquired locally (tertiary-aged Quartzite, Chalcedony Radiolarite) but also super-regionally, as flint from the Meuse- and southern Ruhr regions, Claystone from the Saar-Nahe Basin and Triassic chert from Saarland-Lorraine area attests to. The acquisition of these raw materials indicates high mobility of the hunter-gatherer groups, since some of these areas are up to 150 km away.

Spatial analyses of the various artefact categories and investigations of the lithic inventory resulted in new insights about subsistence strategies of late Palaeolithic hunters. At Niederbieber preparations for the hunt were carried out. Activities included production and maintenance of weapons, but also food preparation and animal product (hides, antler and bone) processing. Most of these activities occurred in the open; however, the spatial arrangement of some of the concentrations suggests that structures (i.e. tents) may have been present.

== Context ==
The Middle-Rhine valley preserves a unique record of the Central European Upper Palaeolithic. As a result of favourable preservation conditions and a longstanding history of research, many archaeological sites were discovered and analysed. Only through the comparison on a local and regional scale can settlement and land-use strategies of these hunter-gatherer groups be reconstructed.

Against the background of other late Palaeolithic sites in the region (e.g. Andernach, Urbar and Kettig), it was possible to propose new models in regards to Federmesser culture settlement dynamics along the Middle Rhine. Alongside more ephemeral hunting camps, such as Niederbieber, there were also longer-term camps (e.g. Kettig). The differences in the distribution of lithic artefacts, relative proportion of specific tool types, as well as the presence of burst quartzite boulders (pot boilers) indicates longer-term occupations and different activity spectra.
