= Bad Breisig (Epipalaeolithic site) =

German archaeological site

Coordinates: 50°31′48″N 7°17′07″E

- Location within Rhineland-Palatinate Location within Germany
- Type: Palaeolithic site
- Periods: Final Palaeolithic
- Cultures: Federmesser-Gruppen
- Location: Bad Breisig

Site notes
- Excavation dates: Autumn 2000 and spring 2001
- Archaeologists: Georg Waldmann
- Discovered: 1999

Bad Breisig is an archaeological site in Germany.

== History of investigation ==
In 1999 Georg Waldmann discovered an archaeological find scatter in the profile of a gravel quarry in the so-called Golden Mile (Schirmer 1990), north of Bad Breisig. Due to typical lithic specimens the concentration is attributed to the Final Palaeolithic Federmesser-Gruppen (Waldmann / Jöris / Baales 2001). Excavations were conducted in autumn 2000 and spring 2001 on behalf of the local office for the preservation of cultural heritage in Koblenz by the department for Palaeolithic Studies of the Romano-Germanic Central Museum (Mainz). These works yielded a concentration of burnt lithic and faunal material around a hearth of which approximately 50% were preserved (Grimm 2004). The archaeological assemblage and the site were analysed in a M.A. thesis at the Institute for Prehistory at the University of Cologne, supervised by Gerhard Bosinski, in close cooperation with department of Palaeolithic Studies at Schloss Monrepos (Neuwied, meanwhile: MONREPOS) where the finds are stored until today.

== Setting, profile and dating ==
The archaeological site was placed on a lower terrace of the Rhine (“Niederterrasse” (lower terrace) 2 = NT2, Schirmer 1990; Baales et al. 2001). West of the site the terrain slopes abruptly down by some 10 m to the modern floodplain of the Rhine. The finds were recovered from slack water deposits („Hochflutlehm“) which were overlaying material from the Laacher See volcanic eruption which is dated to the late Allerød (ca. 11.000 v. Chr.; Baales et al. 2002). The onset of the incision of the Rhine to the next terrace (NT3) was generally assumed to start instantly after the volcanic eruption due to the high amount of pumice in the terrace deposits (Schirmer 1990). Thus, the formation of the slack water deposits containing the archaeological finds can be set to the transition from the Allerød to the Younger Dryas. The settlement of the site is dated to the last part of the Allerød (Greenland Interstadial 1a, Lowe et al. 2008) based on the stratigraphic position of the assemblage, the temperate fauna (Baales et al. 2001) and the dominantly coniferous species determined by charcoal analysis (Waldmann et al. 2001). One of three 14C measurements dated to the transition between the Allerød and the Younger Dryas, whereas the other two samples delivering considerably younger results suffered from presumable contaminations (Baales et al. 2001).

== Archaeological results ==
No other Final Palaeolithic site except Bad Breisig is thus far known from the time after the Laacher See eruption in the Central Rhineland, whereas from time before the volcanic eruption several, well preserved sites were found (Baales 2002). The assemblage from Bad Breisig shows no significant changes to the remains of the well known Federmesser-Gruppen sites from before the eruption: The structure of the site (dense concentration around a hearth), the activities performed on the site (knapping / working place, subsistence related activities) as well as the exploitation of resources (pinewood used as fuel; generally red, occasionally roe deer as alimentary resource; mainly local Tertiary Quartzite, more scarcely Flint from at least 100 km distance were used in the production of Stone tools) and even the origins of the lithic raw materials are similar (Grimm 2004). An indication for a younger development of the finds is given by small lithic bladelets with lateral and terminal retouch, which also occurred in France during the late Allerød and which became a dominant type (the so-called Malaurie points) during the Younger Dryas. Thus, for the Central Rhineland the Final Palaeolithic site of Bad Breisig is evidence for a rapid return and resumption of traditional behaviour patterns of Lateglacial hunter-gatherers after the devastating natural hazard of the Laacher See eruption.
