= Bedburg-Königshoven (Mesolithic antler frontlets) =

Archaeological site in Bedburg, Germany

- Location within Germany
- 51°3′15″N 6°31′18″E
- Type: Settlement
- Periods: Mesolithic
- Location: near Bedburg, Germany

Site notes
- Excavation dates: 1987

Bedburg-Königshoven is a prehistoric archaeological site in Germany where two headdresses made from the antler frontlets and skulls of red deer dated to the Mesolithic were discovered in 1999. The headdresses, dubbed "Cap 1" and "Cap 2", are some of the oldest traces of shamanism—or any religious expression of early modern humans—as yet uncovered.

The site was inhabited in the Mesolithic, in the Preboreal stage of the current Holocene Epoch. The Preboreal lasted from 10,300 to 9,000 Before Present in radiocarbon years, or 8350 BC to 7050 BC in calendar years (8th millennium BCE).

The Bedburg-Königshoven site is located in western Germany near the former village of Morken; the village was destroyed by mining activity in the 1960s and 1970s. In the Mesolithic, Bedburg-Königshoven was situated on a dead branch of the Erft river.

== Discovery and research ==
The Bedburg-Königshoven site was discovered by members of a survey team of the Geographical Institute of the University of Düsseldorf when they encountered animal bones dating to the Last Glacial Period, i.e., the Ice Age, while surveying the area.

The site's center was destroyed by a mining excavator before archaeologists could begin work in 1987. Only 370m² of the shallow water area was excavated and analysed by archaeologists of Monrepos Archaeological Research Centre.

In a subsequent survey, Monrepos archaeologists recovered the skull of a red deer with clear traces of human modification. The generally good state of preservation at the site prompted further excavations. In addition to Early Mesolithic stone tools and the two red deer headdresses or "caps", well-preserved bones of red deer, roe deer, aurochs, dogs, and different species of birds and fish were also found in a discard area. During the Mesolithic these items had been discarded into the shallow water as refuse. Analysis of the faunal remains and the nutrition of the Mesolithic hunter-gatherers by resulted in new insights into human behaviour at the beginning of the current warm stage, the Holocene.

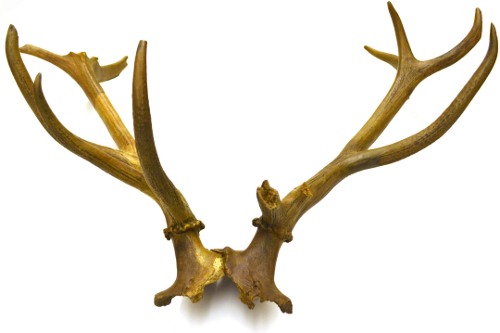
Front view of the RGZM copy of Bedburg-Königshoven antler frontlet 1.

== Description of the antler headdresses ==
The two Bedburg-Königshoven Mesolithic antler frontlet headdresses are dubbed "Cap 1" and "Cap 2". Each cap contains the cranium of a red deer, with parts of the nasal, frontal, parietal, temporal and occipital bones. Cap 1 is that of a royal stag; Cap 2 is that of an imperial stag. Both headdresses show two lateral perforations i.e., punched holes, 1–2 cm in diameter.

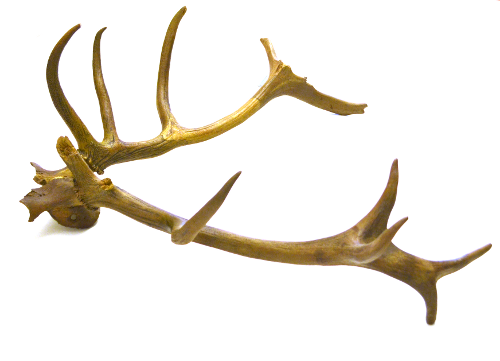
Side view of the RGZM copy of Bedburg-Königshoven antler frontlet 1.

== Comparison with other finds ==
Antler caps have been recovered from other Early Mesolithic sites including Hohen Viecheln, Star Carr (see Star Carr Frontlets), Berlin-Biesdorf and Plau, but the Bedburg-Königshoven finds are unique, as antler caps from these other sites were generally crafted differently than those found at Bedburg-Königshoven. Modifications to the antlers vary among the other sites; they were shortened at Hohen Viecheln, Plau, and Star Carr; thinned at Berlin-Biesdorf, Hohen Viecheln, Plau, and Star Carr; and gouged at Berlin-Biesdorf and Star Carr. At Hohen Viecheln and Star Carr, perforations are located on the parietal bone.

By contrast, the two Bedburg-Königshoven Mesolithic antler frontlets were modified to be lighter than the original antlers from which they were carved, while retaining greater resemblance to their original antlers than caps modified at the other sites.

== Age determination ==
The antler caps from Bedburg-Königshoven were found in fluviatile sediments which, based on palynological evidence, are thought to date into the Preboreal. This assumption is further supported by the lithic typology occurring at the site, the faunal composition and two radiocarbon charcoal samples (KN-3998, KN3999) which place the archaeological horizon into a window of 9780±100 and 9600±100 Before Present[2] radiocarbon years.

== Interpretation and implications ==
When the first modern humans in Europe emerged approximately 40,000 years ago (i.e., the Cro-Magnons), they created figurative artefacts depicting hybrids—part human, part animal—and they increasingly used red deer antlers in the artefacts. Archaeologists interpret these artefacts as forms of prehistoric art which held a profound importance to the hunter-gatherers who made them. Their creators likely viewed these items as powerful prehistoric religious symbols or instruments of shamanism practiced in the Upper Palaeolithic and Mesolithic eras.

Along with the Bedburg-Königshoven antler caps, key examples of prehistoric hybrid artefacts include the Lion Man found at the Hohlenstein-Stadel in Germany and the “sorcerer” painted on a wall in France's Cave of the Trois-Frères.

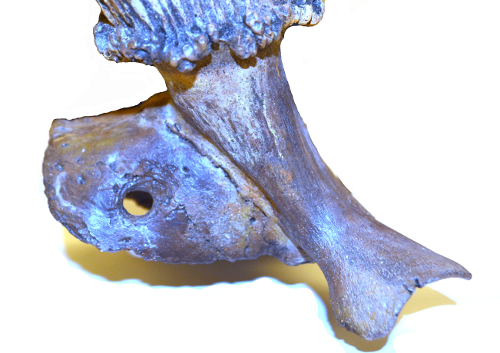
Cap 1 replica detailed side view, from the Römisch-Germanisches Zentralmuseum (RGZM).

As a find category in archaeology, antler caps lack well-founded analysis. The scholarly discussion has not developed beyond a debate about ethnological and ethnographical comparisons, and the implications of the modified headdresses can only be discussed with theoretical approaches. Sir Grahame Clark posited that the antlers, having been lightened and smoothed, were likely worn as a headdress. Many scholars believe that the antler caps were worn in shamanistic practice, and possibly as camouflage during the hunt.

Siberian shamanism itself provides further support for a religious interpretation of the antler caps. In his late 17th-century travels, the Dutch statesman Nicolaes Witsen witnessed a Siberian shaman wearing a red deer antler cap.

Research on the Bedburg-Königshoven caps is ongoing. Studies focus on their functional background, modifications, and usage. One research goal is the development of new methods for understanding the regulations and conventions that governed hunter-gatherer societies.

== See also ==
- Duvensee archaeological sites – Series of archaeological sites in Duvensee, Germany

== Literature ==
- Clark, J. G. D. Excavations at Star Carr. An early Mesolithic site at Seamer near Scarborough, Yorkshire. Cambridge 1954.
- Street, M. 1989. Jäger und Schamanen. Bedburg-Königshoven : ein Wohnplatz am Niederrhein vor 10000 Jahren. Mainz.
- Street, M. 1991. Bedburg-Königshoven: A Pre-Boreal Mesolithic site in the Lower Rhineland, Germany. In: N Barton, A J Roberts and D ARoe (eds.). The Late Glacial in north-west Europe: Human adaptation and environmental change at the end of the Pleistocene. CBA Research Report 77. 1991.
- Street, M. 1999. Remains of aurochs (Bos primigenius) from the early Mesolithic site Bedburg-Königshoven (Rhineland, Germany). Wissenschaftliche Schriften des Neandertal Museums(1): pp. 173–194. Proceedings of the First Neanderthal Conference, Mettmann 25.-26. October, 1997.
- Behling, H and Street, M. 1999. Palaeoecological studies at the Mesolithic site at Bedburg-Königshoven near Cologne, Germany. Veget Hist Archaeobot (8): 273–285.
- Conneller, C. 2004. Becoming deer: corporeal transformations at Star Carr. Archaeological Dialogues (11): 37–56.
- Gaudzinski-Windheuser, S. and Jöris, O. 2006. 600.000 Jahre Menschheitsgeschichte. Begleitbuch zur Ausstellung im Museum für die Archäologie des Eiszeitalters, Schloss Monrepos, Neuwied. Mainz. pp. 68–71.
