= Mofetta =

Point at which carbon dioxide escapes in a volcano

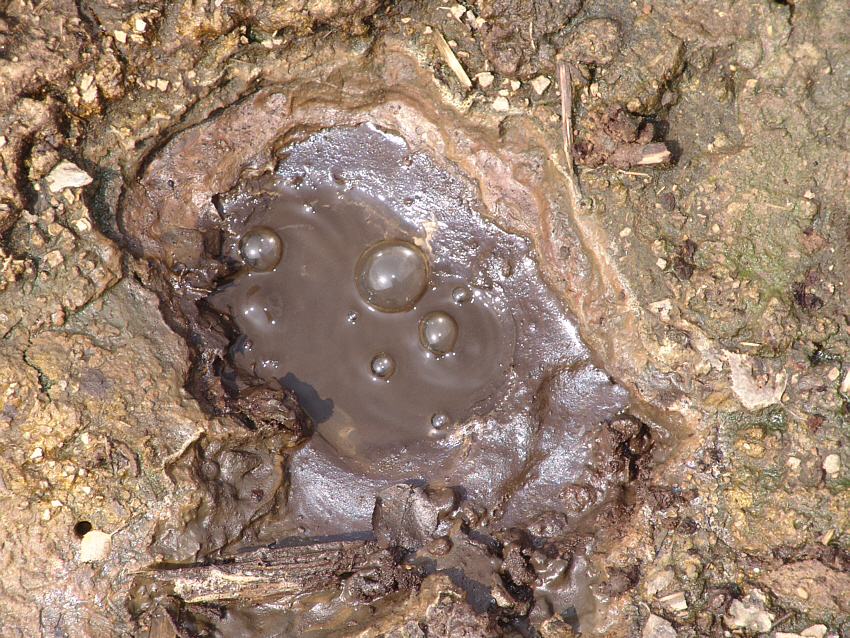
Mofetta with gas bubbles in Soos National Nature Reserve near Skalná, Czech Republic

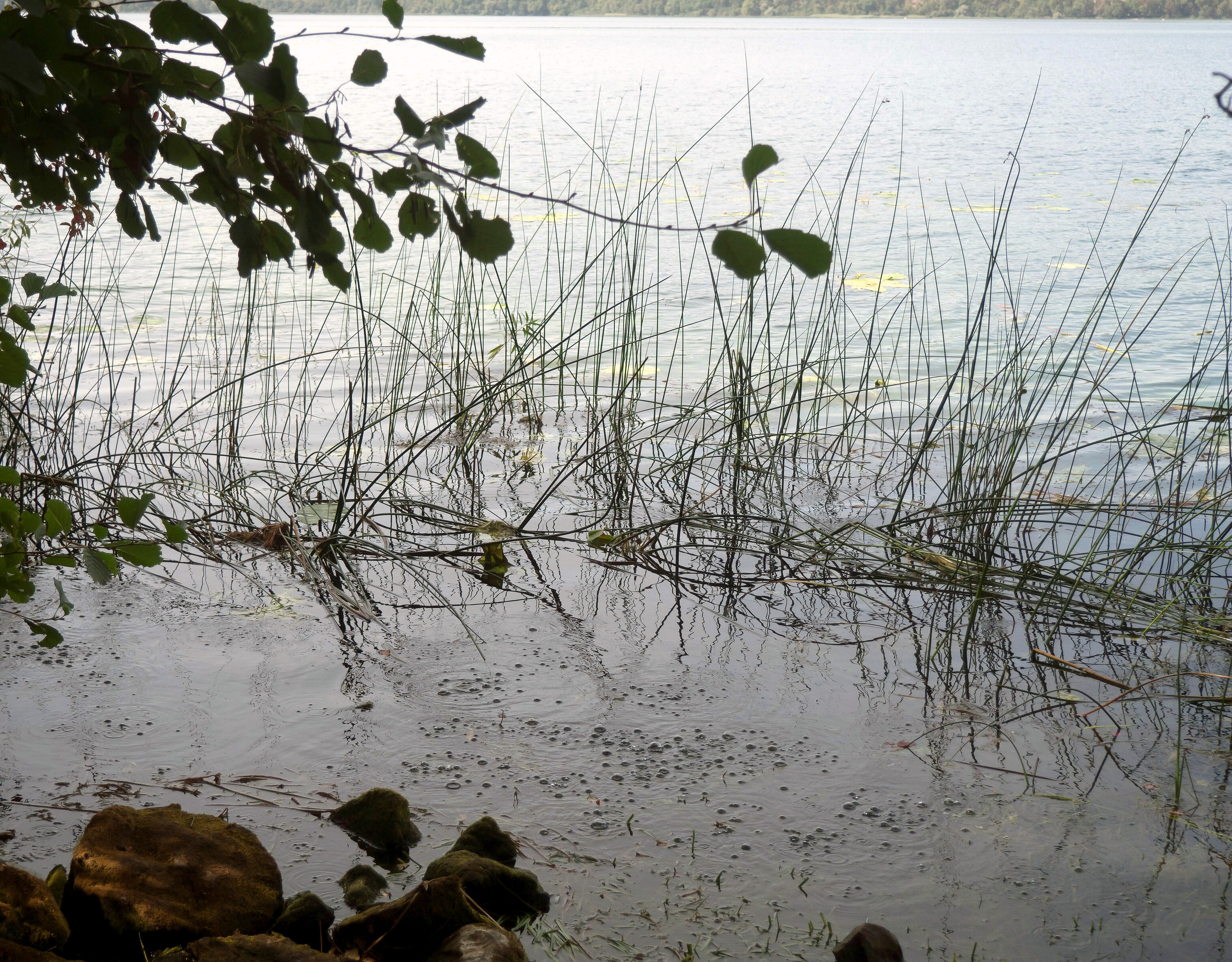
Mofettas on the southeastern shore of the Laacher See, near Andernach, Rhineland-Palatinate, Germany

Mofetta (Italian from Latin mephītis, a pestilential exhalation) is a name applied to a volcanic discharge consisting chiefly of carbon dioxide, often associated with other vapours, representing the final phase of volcanic activity. The Oxford Dictionary of English lists mofetta as an archaic term for the modern word fumarole.

The word is used in the plural as mofette, or, following the French fashion, mofettes. The volcanic vents yielding the emanations are themselves called mofette. They are not uncommon in Auvergne and in the Eifel, notably on the shore of the Laacher See; whilst other examples are furnished by the Grotta del Cane, near Pozzuoli, the Valley of Death in Java, the Death Gulch in the Yellowstone Park and the series of mofette in Romania's Harghita and Covasna counties.

== See also ==
- Fumarole
