= Volcanic gas =

Gases given off by active volcanoes

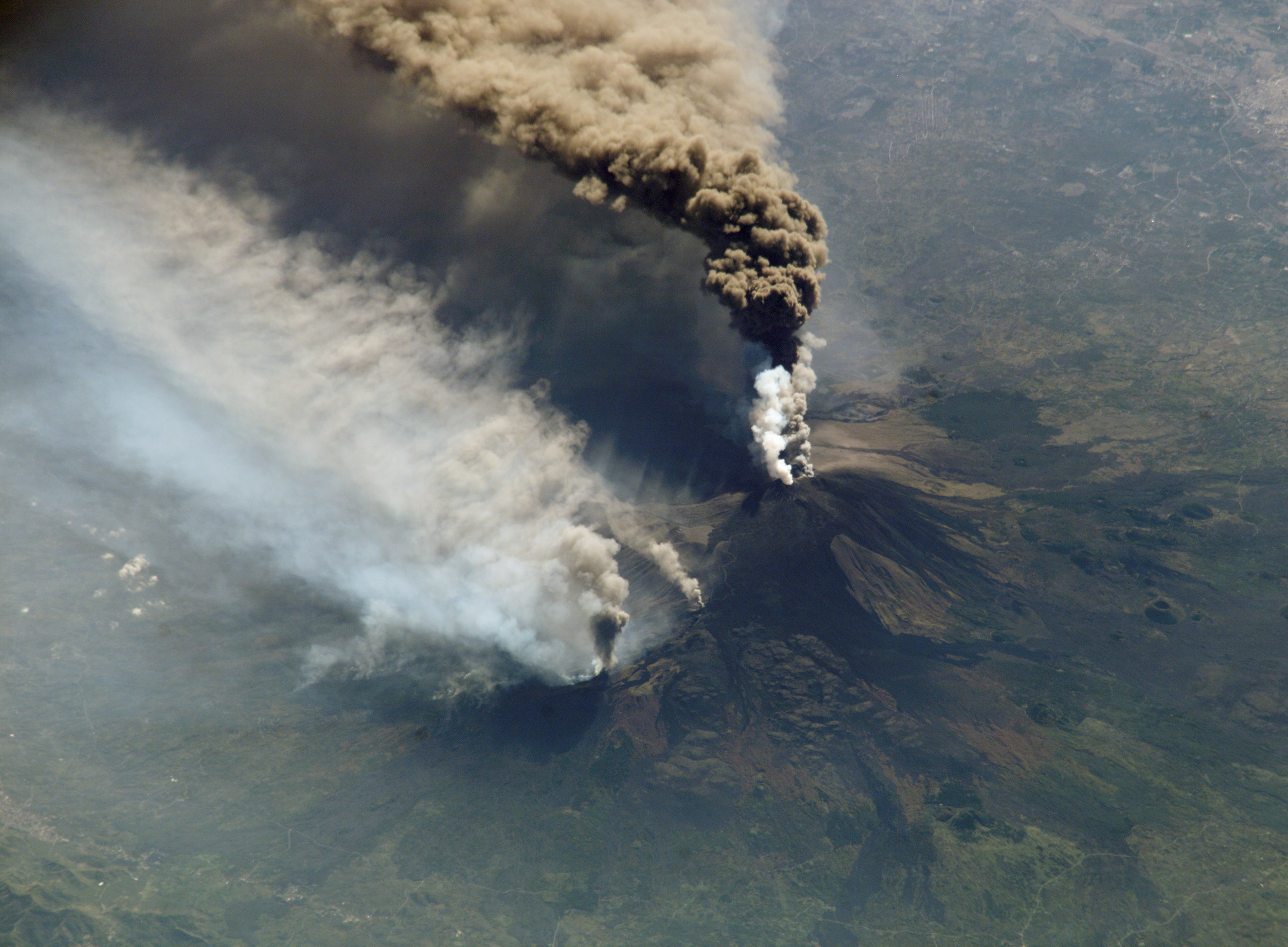
Volcanic gases entering the atmosphere during the eruption of Mount Etna in 2002

Volcanic gases are gases given off by active (or, at times, by dormant) volcanoes. These include gases trapped in cavities (vesicles) in volcanic rocks, dissolved or dissociated gases in magma and lava, or gases emanating from lava, from volcanic craters or vents. Volcanic gases can also be emitted through groundwater heated by volcanic action.

The sources of volcanic gases on Earth include:

- primordial and recycled constituents from the Earth's mantle,
- assimilated constituents from the Earth's crust,
- groundwater and the Earth's atmosphere.

Substances that may become gaseous or give off gases when heated are termed volatile substances.

Volcanic gases are not only released during an eruption; they can also seep out slowly when a volcano is inactive through a continuous process known as passive degassing, which can persist for years. Even small emissions can affect the surrounding environment by changing soil and water chemistry and impacting plants and animals. By studying changes in gas composition and emission rates, scientists can monitor volcanic activity and assess potential hazards before an eruption occurs.

== Composition ==
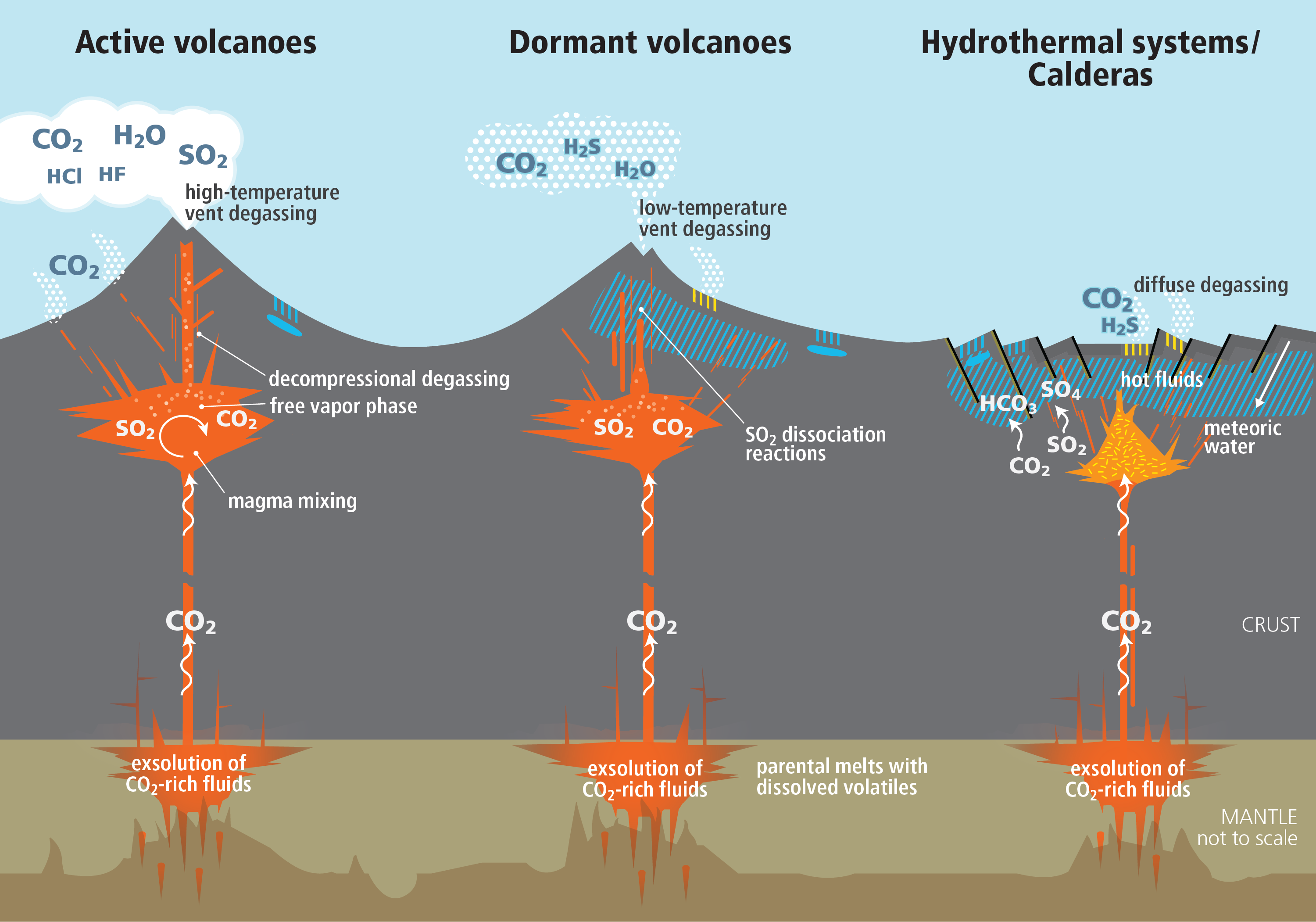
Schematic showing typical carbon dioxide emission patterns from volcanic and magmatic systems

Average carbon dioxide (CO_{2}) emissions of subaerial volcanoes globally from the time period of 2005 to 2017

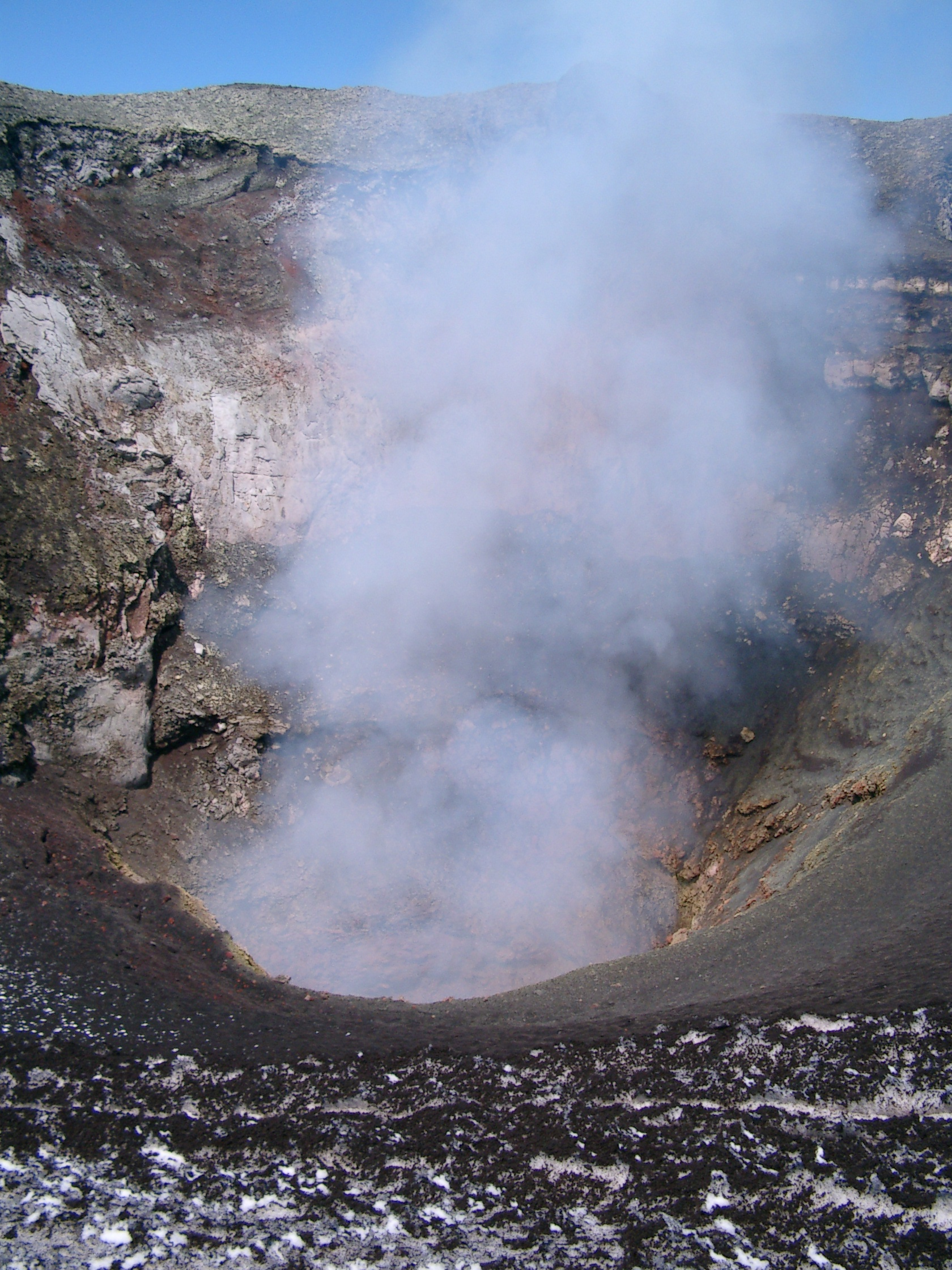
Degassing at the summit crater of Villarrica, Chile

The principal components of volcanic gases are water vapor (H_{2}O), carbon dioxide (CO_{2}), sulfur either as sulfur dioxide (SO_{2}) (high-temperature volcanic gases) or hydrogen sulfide (H_{2}S) (low-temperature volcanic gases), nitrogen, argon, helium, neon, methane, carbon monoxide and hydrogen. Other compounds detected in volcanic gases are oxygen (meteoric), hydrogen chloride, hydrogen fluoride, hydrogen bromide, sulfur hexafluoride, carbonyl sulfide, and organic compounds. Exotic trace compounds include mercury, halocarbons (including CFCs), and halogen oxide radicals.

The abundance of gases varies considerably from volcano to volcano, with volcanic activity and with tectonic setting. Water vapour is consistently the most abundant volcanic gas, normally comprising more than 60% of total emissions. Carbon dioxide typically accounts for 10 to 40% of emissions.

Volcanoes located at convergent plate boundaries emit more water vapor and chlorine than volcanoes at hot spots or divergent plate boundaries. This is caused by the addition of seawater into magmas formed at subduction zones. Convergent plate boundary volcanoes also have higher H_{2}O/H_{2}, H_{2}O/CO_{2}, CO_{2}/He and N_{2}/He ratios than hot spot or divergent plate boundary volcanoes.

== Magmatic gases and high-temperature volcanic gases ==
Magma contains dissolved volatile components, as described above. The solubilities of these different volatiles depend on pressure, temperature and magma composition. As magma ascends, ambient pressure decreases, decreasing solubility of the dissolved volatiles. When solubility falls below the volatile concentration, gases exsolve, forming a separate gas phase, and the magma becomes supersaturated in volatiles.

The gas will initially be distributed throughout the magma as small bubbles that cannot rise quickly. As the magma ascends, the bubbles grow due to decompression and further exsolution caused by decreasing volatile solubility. Depending on magma viscosity, bubbles may either rise and coalesce or remain relatively fixed in place until forming a continuous network. In the first case, the bubbles can accumulate at vertical surfaces, such as the roof of a magma chamber. In volcanoes with an open path to the surface, such as Stromboli in Italy, bubbles may reach the surface producing small explosions as they pop. In the second case, gas can flow rapidly through the permeable network towards the surface, a mechanism observed at Santiaguito, Santa Maria volcano, Guatemala and Soufrière Hills Volcano, Montserrat.

If gas cannot escape fast enough, magma fragments into fine ash. The fluidized ash has much lower resistance to motion than viscous magma, so accelerates, causing further gas expansion and rapid motion of the mixture. This sequence drives explosive volcanism. Whether gas escapes gently (passive eruptions) or violently (explosive eruptions) depends on magma's total volatile content and its viscosity, which is controlled by composition.

The term "closed system" degassing refers to a process in which gas and its parent magma ascend together while remaining in equilibrium. The composition of the emitted gas reflects equilibrium with magma at the pressure and temperature where the gas leaves the system. In "open system" degassing, gas separates from its parent magma and rises through the overlying magma without remaining in equilibrium. As a result, the gas released at the surface represents a mass-flow average of the magma exsolved at multiple depths and does not correspond to magma conditions at any single depth.

Molten rock (magma or lava) near the atmosphere releases high-temperature volcanic gas (>400 °C). In explosive eruptions, the sudden release of gas from magma can cause rapid movements of the molten rock. When the magma encounters water, such as seawater, lake water or groundwater, it may be rapidly fragmented. Rapid gas expansion is the primary driving mechanism of most explosive volcanic eruptions. However, a significant proportion of volcanic gas is also released during quasi-continuous, quiescent phases of active volcanism.

== Low-temperature volcanic gases and hydrothermal systems ==
As magmatic gas travelling upward encounters meteoric water in an aquifer, steam is produced. Latent magmatic heat can also cause meteoric waters to ascend as a vapour phase. Extended fluid-rock interaction of this hot mixture can leach constituents out of the cooling magmatic rock and also the country rock, causing volume changes and phase transitions, reactions and thus an increase in ionic strength of the upward percolating fluid. This process also decreases the fluid's pH. Cooling can cause phase separation and mineral deposition, accompanied by a shift toward more reducing conditions. At the surface expression of such hydrothermal systems, low-temperature volcanic gases (<400 °C) are either emanating as steam-gas mixtures or in dissolved form in hot springs. At the ocean floor, such hot supersaturated hydrothermal fluids form gigantic chimney structures called black smokers, at the point of emission into the cold seawater.

Over geological time, this process of hydrothermal leaching, alteration, and/or redeposition of minerals in the country rock is an effective process of concentration that generates certain types of economically valuable ore deposits.

== Non-explosive volcanic gas release ==
The gas release can occur by advection through fractures, or via diffuse degassing through large areas of permeable ground as diffuse degassing structures (DDS). At sites of advective gas loss, precipitation of sulfur and rare minerals forms sulfur deposits and small sulfur chimneys, called fumaroles. Very low-temperature (below 100 °C) fumarolic structures are also known as solfataras. Sites of cold degassing of predominantly carbon dioxide are called mofettes. Hot springs on volcanoes often show a measurable amount of magmatic gas in dissolved form.

== Current emissions of volcanic gases to the atmosphere ==
Present-day global emissions of volcanic gases to the atmosphere are commonly classified as eruptive or non-eruptive. Although volcanoes emit many types of gases, the emissions of CO_{2} (a greenhouse gas) and SO_{2} have received the most study because of their effects on the atmosphere, climate, and local ecosystems.

It has long been recognized that eruptions contribute substantially less total SO_{2} emissions than passive degassing does. Fischer et al (2019) estimated that between 2005 and 2015, SO_{2} emissions during eruptions averaged 2.6 teragrams (Tg or 10^{12}g) per year compared to 23.2 ± 2 Tg per year during non-eruptive periods of passive degassing. Over the same interval, volcanic CO_{2} emissions were estimated at 1.8 ± 0.9 Tg per year from eruptions and 51.3 ± 5.7 Tg per year from non-eruptive activity. These estimates indicate that eruptive CO_{2} emissions account for less than 10% of total annual volcanic CO_{2} output.

Although large eruptions are rare, they can release significant quantities of gas over short periods. The 15 June 1991 eruption of Mount Pinatubo (VEI 6) in the Philippines released approximately 18 ± 4 Tg of SO_{2}. Such large VEI 6 eruptions are rare and only occur once every 50 – 100 years. Similarly, the 2010 eruptions of Eyjafjallajökull (VEI 4) in Iceland emitted a total of 5.1 Tg CO_{2}. VEI 4 eruptions occur about once per year. Despite these substantial releases, total long-term emissions from passive degassing remain higher than those from individual eruptive events.

For comparison, Le Quéré, C. et al estimates that human burning of fossil fuels and cement production processed 9.3 Gt carbon per year from 2006 through 2015, equivalent to 34.1 Gt CO_{2} annually. While volcanoes are a significant natural source of carbon dioxide, human activities currently account for the majority of atmospheric CO_{2} increases.

Some recent estimates of volcanic CO_{2} emissions are higher than those reported by Fischer et al (2019). Estimates of Burton et al. (2013) of 540 Tg CO_{2}/year and by Werner et al. (2019) of 220–300 Tg CO_{2} per year incorporate diffuse soil degassing from volcanic regions, resulting in larger global totals.

== Sensing, collection and measurement ==
Volcanic gases were collected and analyzed as long ago as 1790 by Scipione Breislak in Italy. The composition of volcanic gases is dependent on the movement of magma within the volcano. Therefore, sudden changes in gas composition often presage a change in volcanic activity. Accordingly, a large part of hazard monitoring of volcanoes involves regular measurement of gaseous emissions. For example, an increase in the CO_{2} content of gases at Stromboli has been ascribed to injection of fresh volatile-rich magma at depth within the system.

Volcanic gases can be sensed (measured in-situ) or sampled for further analysis. Volcanic gas sensing can be:

- within the gas by means of electrochemical sensors and flow-through infrared-spectroscopic gas cells
- outside the gas by ground-based or airborne remote spectroscopy e.g., Correlation spectroscopy (COSPEC), Differential Optical Absorption Spectroscopy (DOAS), or Fourier Transform Infrared Spectroscopy (FTIR).

Sulphur dioxide (SO_{2}) absorbs strongly in the ultraviolet wavelengths and has low background concentrations in the atmosphere. These characteristics make sulphur dioxide a good target for volcanic gas monitoring. It can be detected by satellite-based instruments, which allow for global monitoring, and by ground-based instruments such as DOAS. DOAS arrays are placed near some well-monitored volcanoes and used to estimate the flux of SO_{2} emitted. The Multi-Component Gas Analyzer System (Multi-GAS) is also used to remotely measure CO_{2}, SO_{2} and H_{2}S. The fluxes of other gases are usually estimated by measuring the ratios of different gases within the volcanic plume, e.g. by FTIR, electrochemical sensors at the volcano crater rim, or direct sampling, and multiplying the ratio of the gas of interest to SO_{2} by the SO_{2} flux.

Direct sampling of volcanic gas sampling is often conducted using an evacuated flask containing a caustic solution, first used by Robert W. Bunsen (1811–1899) and later refined by the German chemist Werner F. Giggenbach (1937–1997), dubbed Giggenbach-bottle. Other methods include collection in evacuated empty containers, in flow-through glass tubes, in gas wash bottles (cryogenic scrubbers), on impregnated filter packs and on solid adsorbent tubes.

Analytical techniques for gas samples comprise gas chromatography with thermal conductivity detection (TCD), flame ionization detection (FID) and mass spectrometry (GC-MS) for gases, and various wet chemical techniques for dissolved species (e.g., acidimetric titration for dissolved CO_{2}, and ion chromatography for sulfate, chloride, fluoride). The trace metal, trace organic and isotopic composition is usually determined by different mass spectrometric methods.

== Volcanic gases and volcano monitoring ==
Certain constituents of volcanic gases may show very early signs of changing conditions at depth, making them a powerful tool to predict imminent unrest. Used in conjunction with monitoring data on seismicity and deformation, correlative monitoring gains great efficiency. Volcanic gas monitoring is a standard tool of any volcano observatory. Unfortunately, the most precise compositional data still require dangerous field sampling campaigns. However, remote sensing techniques have advanced tremendously through the 1990s. The Deep Earth Carbon Degassing Project is employing Multi-GAS remote sensing to monitor nine volcanoes on a continuous basis.

== Hazards ==
Volcanic gases were directly responsible for approximately 3% of all volcano-related deaths of humans between 1900 and 1986. Some volcanic gases kill by acidic corrosion; others kill by asphyxiation. Some volcanic gases including sulfur dioxide, hydrogen chloride, hydrogen sulfide and hydrogen fluoride react with other atmospheric particles to form aerosols.

In addition to these hazards, volcanic gases can slowly seep into large areas of porous ground, which are called diffuse degassing areas. Even when a volcano is not erupting, gases such as carbon dioxide can build up in low-lying areas and reach hazardous concentrations, posing risks to people, animals, and vegetation. Volcanic gases can also alter soil and groundwater, increasing acidity and affecting surrounding ecosystems. Because these hazards can occur far from the volcanic vent and are not always visually obvious, monitoring gas concentrations is an important component of volcanic hazard assessment.

== Gallery ==
Schematic of volcanic eruption

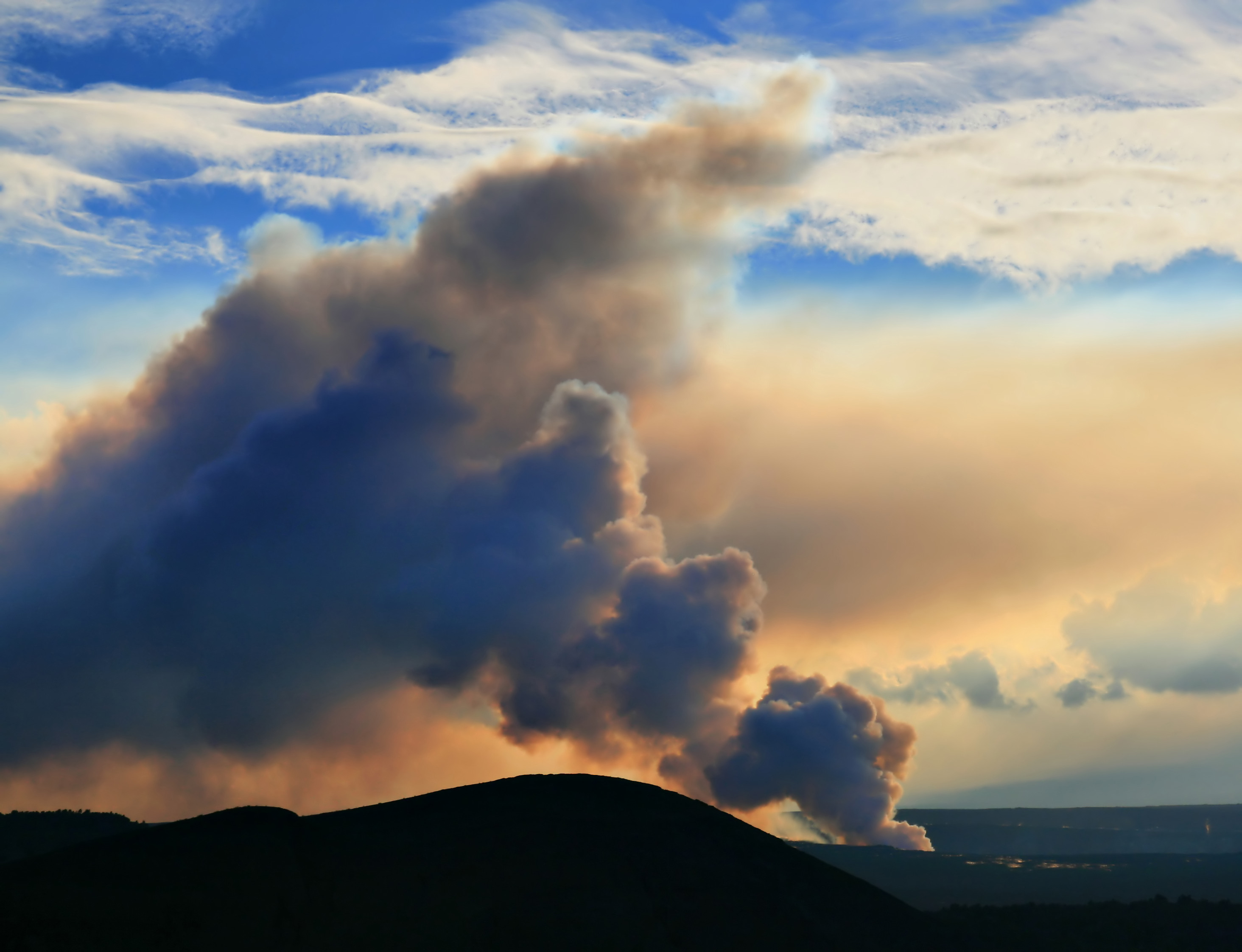
Vog in Hawaii, Kilauea 2008 eruptions

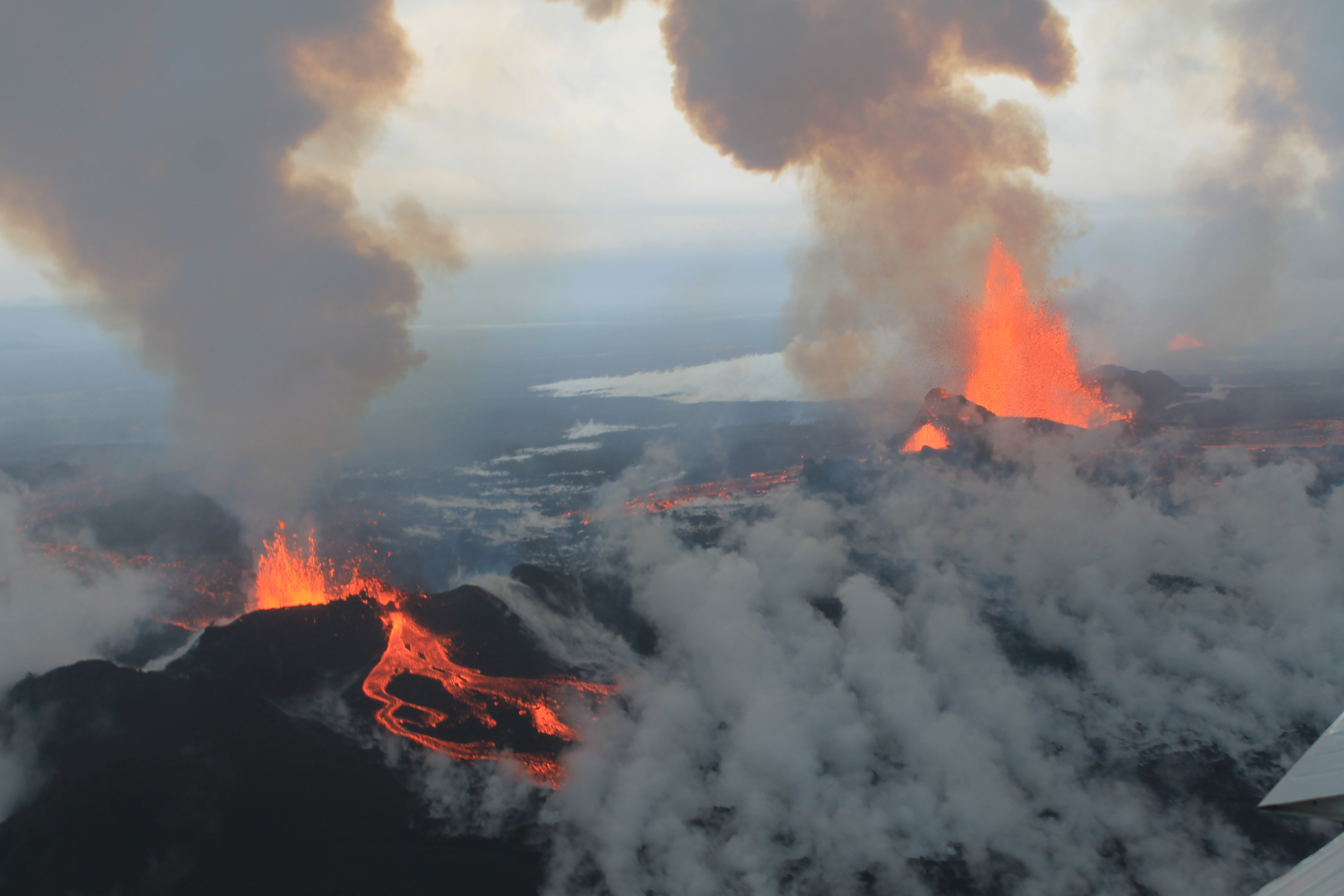
Lava fountains at Holuhraun

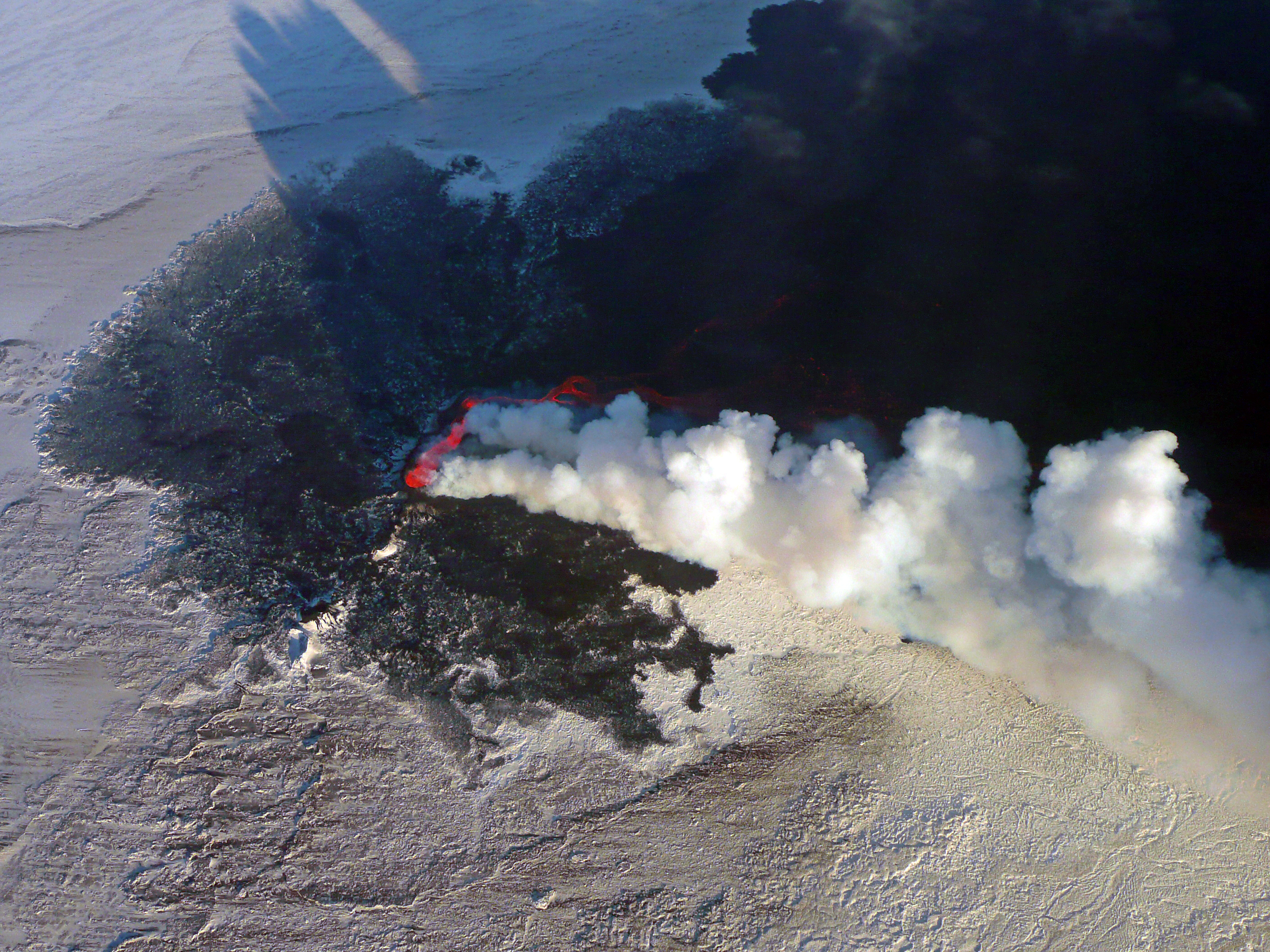
Eruption columns of mixed eruption at Holuhraun, Iceland in 2014

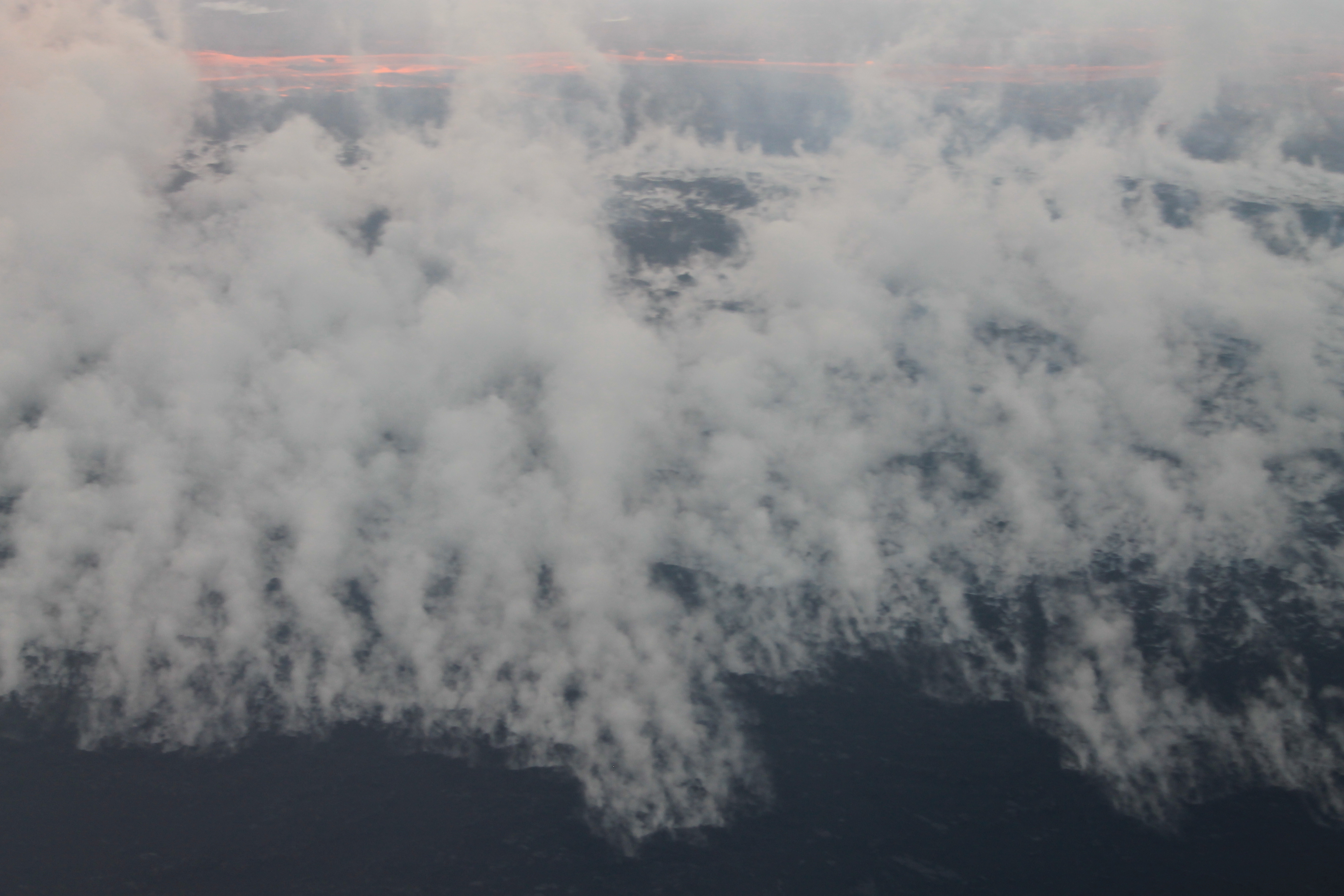
Degassing lava field, Holuhraun, Iceland

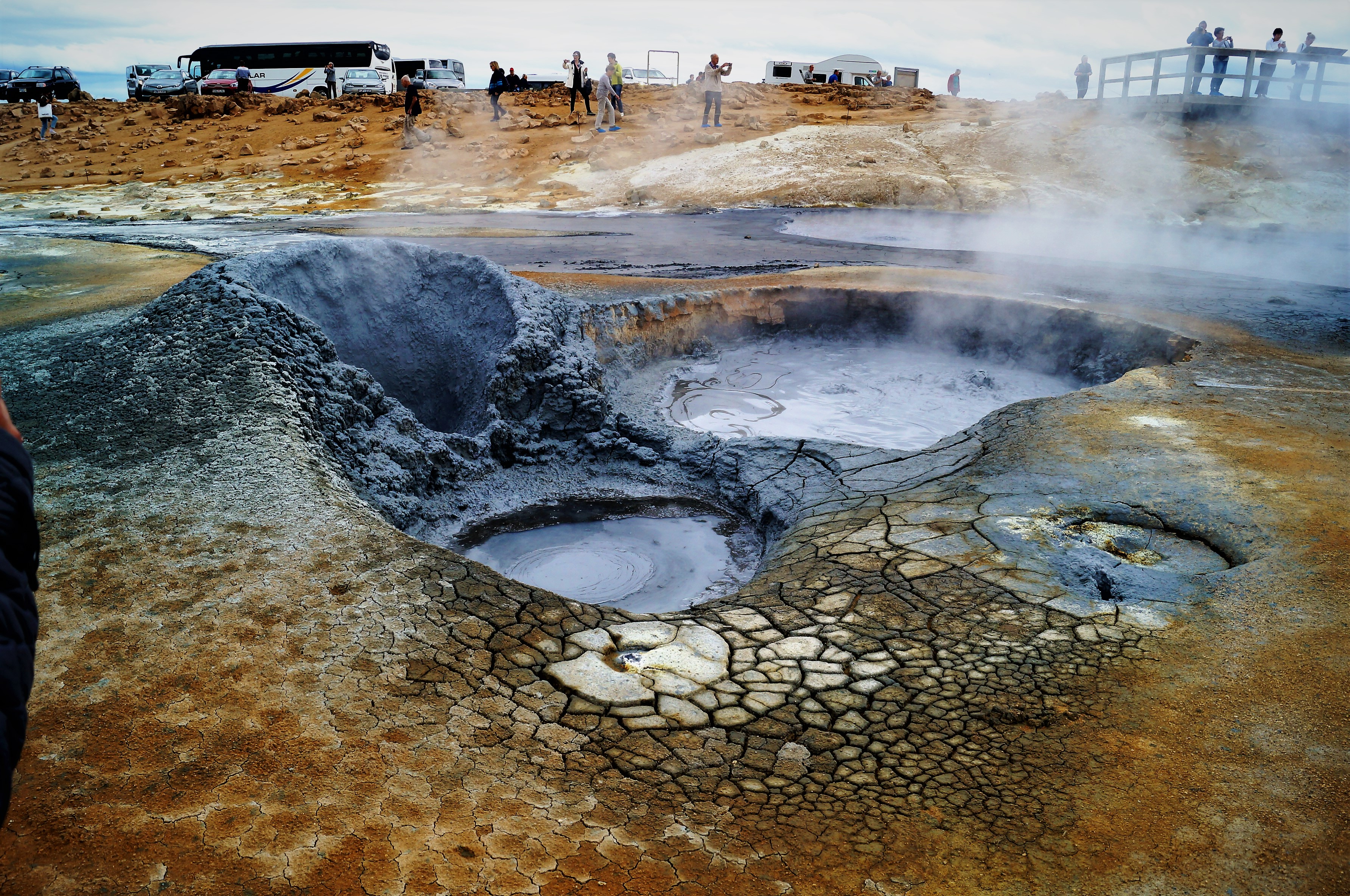
Degassing mudpots at Hverarönd high temperature geothermal area, Krafla system, North Iceland

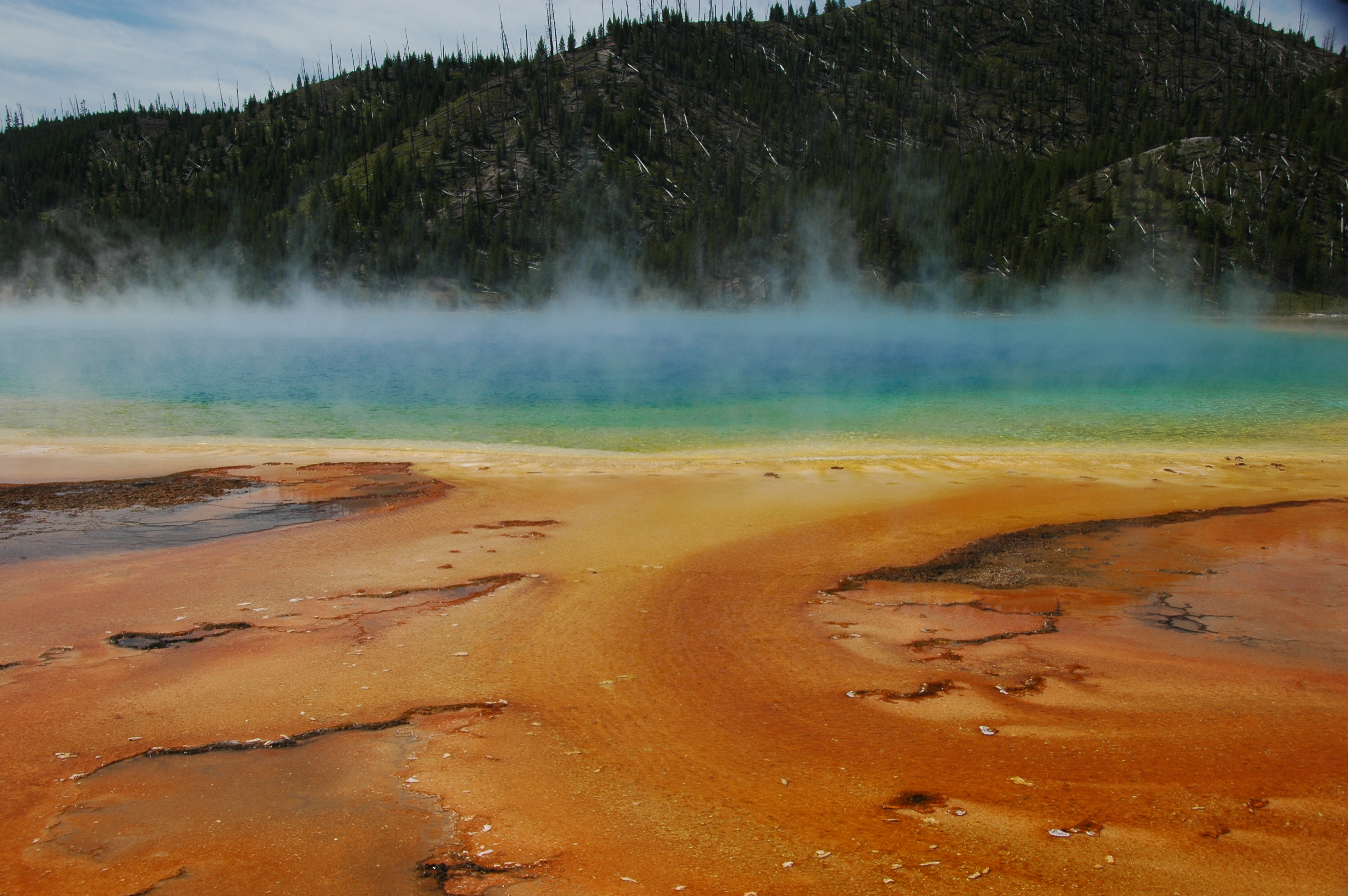
Degassing at Grand Prismatic Spring, Yellowstone National Park

== See also ==
- Amygdule – Infilled gas cavity in extrusive igneous rock
- Eruption column – Cloud of hot ash and volcanic gases emitted during an explosive volcanic eruption
- Fumarole – Volcanic opening that emits hot gases
- Gas laws – Physical laws describing gases
- Geyser – Natural explosive eruption of hot water
- Lake Nyos – Crater lake in the Northwest Region of Cameroon
- Mofette – Point at which carbon dioxide escapes in a volcano
- Solfatara – Volcanic opening that emits hot gases
- Volatility (chemistry) – Tendency of a substance to vaporize
- Volatile (astrogeology) – Elements and compounds that are readily vaporized
