= Schweinskopf (Hinterland) =

Mountain in Germany

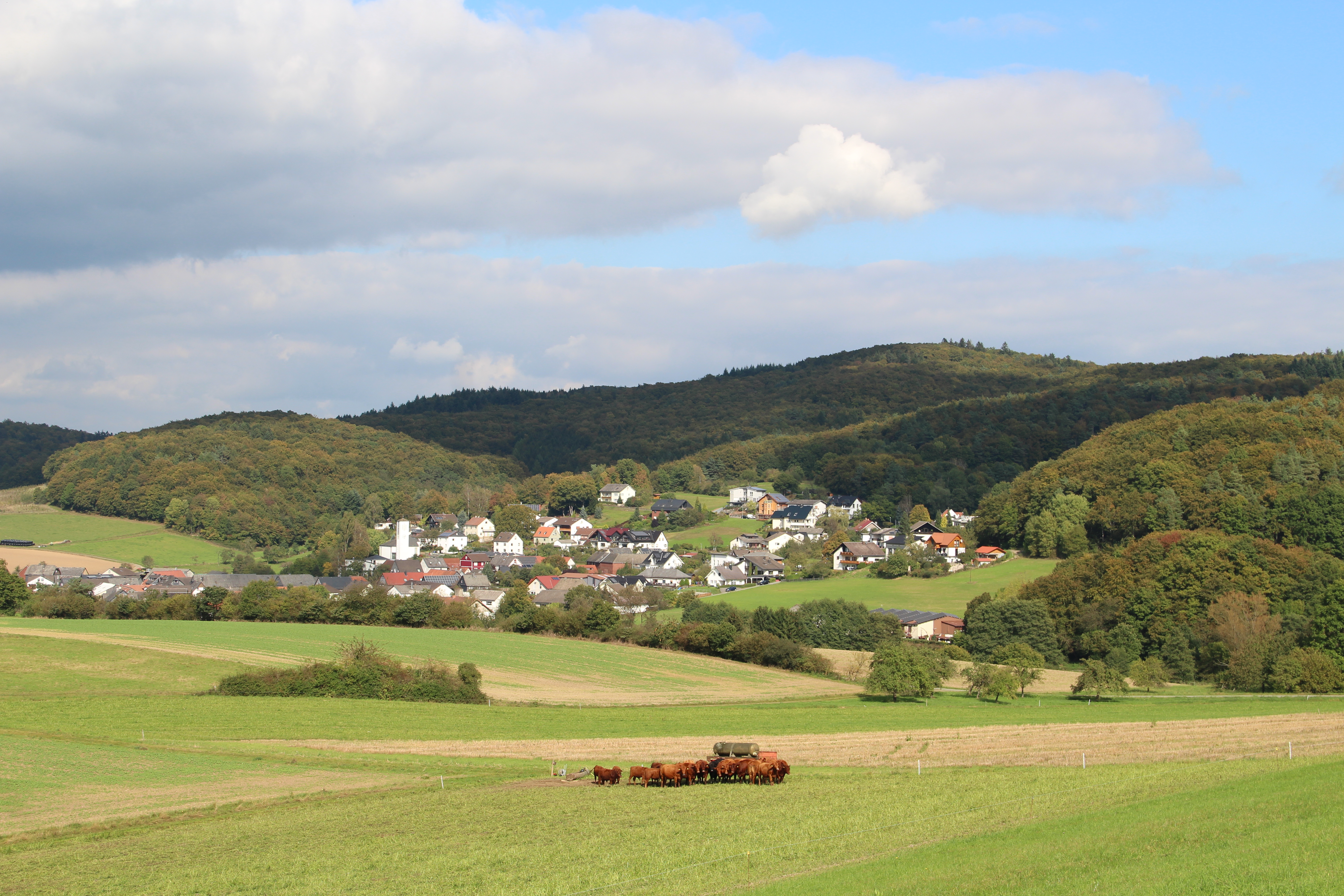
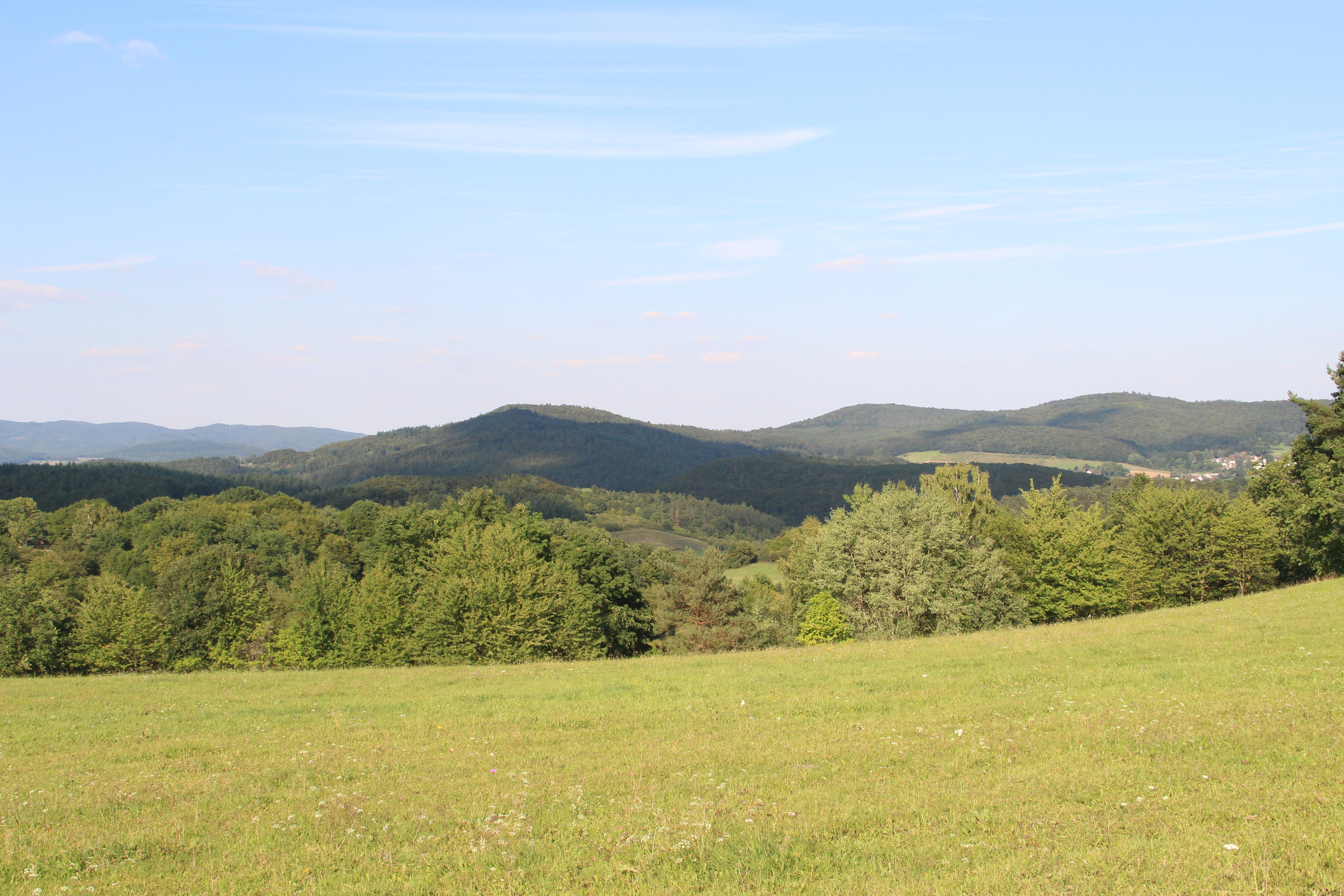
- The Schweinsberg from the southwest. In the foreground is the village of Herzhausen Summits on the horizon: to the left is the centre of the Hornberg and, to its right are the Eichelhardt and the Schweinskopf.

Highest point
- Elevation: 473 m (1,552 ft)
- Prominence: 58 m ↓ Kreisstraße Friedensdorf–Weitershausen
- Isolation: 2.4 km → Kappe (Note: The isolation value is only valid if the height of 473m shown on old maps is used. If the Schweinskopf is lower than 471.1 m its isolation would only be just under 2 km (to the Hohen Höll).)
- Coordinates: 50°49′54″N 8°34′14″E

Geography
- Location within Hesse
- Parent range: Damshäuser Kuppen, Gladenbach Uplands

The Schweinskopf is a hill, 473 metres high, (Note: This is the height given on older maps; current maps do not indicate its height.) in the German state of Hesse. The hill is part of the Damshausen Heights (Damshäuser Kuppen). Situated on the edge of the village of Friedensdorf, it is the highest elevation in the parish.

After the Rimberg (497.1 m) and the Kappe (493.5 m), it is the third highest summit in the Damshausen Heights and highest point of the western part of the range.

== Location ==
The hill summit is about 800 metres east of Herzhausen and 800 metres south of the Eichelhardt (465 m). It is about 1.7 kilometres from Friedensdorf.
