= Sabine Gaudzinski-Windheuser =

German anthropologist, paleontologist, archaeologist and prehistorian

- Born: 25 June 1965 (age 61)
- Education: Cologne University
- Scientific career
- Fields: Archaeology
- Institutions: Johannes Gutenberg-University
- Thesis: (1992)

Sabine Gaudzinski-Windheuser (born 25 June 1965) is a German archaeologist. She is a professor at the Johannes Gutenberg-University, Mainz and Director of the Monrepos Archaeological Research Centre and Museum for human behavioural Evolution of the Römisch-Germanisches Zentralmuseum at Monrepos Castle in Neuwied, Germany.

== Education and career ==
Gaudzinski-Windheuser studied Pre- and Protohistorical Archaeology, Geology/Palaeontology and Physical Anthropology at several universities in Germany. She received her Doctorate 1992 at Cologne University, Germany and began her academic career as a researcher with the Römisch-Germanisches Zentralmuseum. Between 1996 and 2003 she repeatedly was a visiting researcher at the Institute for Evolution, Systematics and Ecology at the Hebrew University of Jerusalem, Israel and taught at the University of Cologne (Germany), Basel (Switzerland) and Leiden (The Netherlands). In 2003 she was appointed full Professor at the Johannes Gutenberg-University Mainz. In the same year she became Director of the Monrepos Archaeological Research Centre and Museum for the Evolution of Human Behaviour what was then the Forschungsbereich Altsteinzeit.

== Scientific work ==
Sabine Gaudzinski-Windheuser dedicates her research to the understanding of the evolution of hominin behaviour in the Palaeolithic. Her work is focusing on the evolution of subsistence strategies and their effects on social organisation and landuse. She is best known for her zooarchaeological work on Pleistocene subsistence strategies in Europe and the Levant. Her work demonstrated for the first time the variety of prey exploitation strategies during the Pleistocene and that hominin hunting as a behavioural pattern can be traced back to 1.4 million years ago.

Her research makes important contributions to zooarchaeological methodology, taphonomy and archaeological site formation processes.

Furthermore Sabine Gaudzinski-Windheuser worked on the evolution of settlement behaviour and social interaction in early anatomically modern human societies.

She has undertaken fieldwork at the 400.000 year old German site of Kärlich-Seeufer, the 1.4-million-year-old Israeli site of ‘Ubeidiya and the Middle Palaeolithic Eemian Interglacial site of Neumark-Nord 2.

== Selected publications ==
=== Books ===
- Gaudzinski-Windheuser, S., 2013. Raumnutzungsmuster des späten Jungpaläolithikums in Oelknitz (Thüringen). Monographien des Römisch-Germanischen Zentralmuseums Mainz, RGZM, Mainz.
- Gaudzinski-Windheuser, S., Kindler, L., 2012. The evolution of hominin food resource exploitation in Pleistocene Europe: Recent studies in Zooarchaeology. Quaternary International 252, 1-202.
- Gaudzinski-Windheuser, S., Jöris, O., Sensburg, M., Street, M., Turner, E., (Eds.) 2011. Site-internal Spatial Organization of Hunter-Gatherer Societies: case studies from the European Palaeolithic and Mesolithic. Verlag des RGZM, Mainz.
- Rabinovich, R., Gaudzinski-Windheuser, S., Kindler, L., Goren-Inbar, N., 2011. The Acheulian site of Gesher Benot Ya'aqov. Mammalian Taphonomy. The assemblages of Layers V-5 and V-6. Springer, Dordrecht.
- Gaudzinski-Windheuser, S., Höfer, R., Jöris, O., 2007. GANZ ALT. Wie bunt war die Vergangenheit wirklich? Die Archäologie des Eiszeitalters umgesetzt von Otmar Alt. Verlag des Römisch-Germanischen Zentralmuseums, Mainz.
- Gaudzinski-Windheuser, S., Jöris, O., 2006. 600.000 Jahre Menschheitsgeschichte in der Mitte Europas. Verlag des Römisch-Germanischen Zentralmuseums, Mainz.
- Gaudzinski-Windheuser, S., 2005. Subsistenzstrategien frühpleistozäner Hominiden in Eurasien. Taphonomische Faunenbetrachtungen der Fundstellen der 'Ubeidiya Formation (Israel). Monographien des Römisch-Germanischen Zentralmuseums Mainz 61, Habelt, Mainz & Bonn.
- Gaudzinski, S., Turner, E., 1999. The role of early humans in the accumulation of European Lower, and Middle Palaeolithic bone assemblages. Monographien des Römisch-Germanischen Zentralmuseums Mainz. Habelt, Mainz & Bonn.
- Gaudzinski, S., 1998. Kärlich-Seeufer. Untersuchungen zu einer altpaläolithischen Fundstelle im Neuwieder Becken (Rheinland-Pfalz). Jahrbuch des Römisch-Germanischen Zentralmuseums Mainz 43, 3-239.
- Gaudzinski, S., 1995. Wisentjäger in Wallertheim. Zur Taphonomie einer mittelpaläolithischen Freilandfundstelle in Rheinhessen. Jahrbuch des Römisch-Germanischen Zentralmuseums 39, 245-423.

=== Publications in journals and books ===
- Gaudzinski-Windheuser, S., 2012. Indication for social interaction during the Central European Late Upper Palaeolithic: Evidence from the Magdalenian site of Oelknitz, Structure 1 (Thuringia, Germany). Quaternary International 252, 165-174.
- Gaudzinski-Windheuser, S., Kindler, L., 2012. Research perspectives for the study of Neanderthal subsistence strategies based on the analysis of archaeozoological assemblages. Quaternary International 247, 59-68.
- Gaudzinski-Windheuser, S., Roebroeks, W., 2011. On Neanderthal Subsistence in Last Interglacial Forested environments in Northern Europe. In: Conard, N., Richter, J. (Eds.), Neanderthal Lifeways, Subsistence and Technology. Springer, Dordrecht, 61-71.
- Gaudzinski-Windheuser, S., Niven, L., 2009. Hominid subsistence patterns during the Middle and Late Paleolithic in Northwestern Europe. In: J.-J. Hublin, M.P. Richards (Eds.), The Evolution of Hominin diets. Springer, Dordrecht, 99-111.
- Rabinovich, R., Gaudzinski-Windheuser, S., Goren-Inbar, N., 2008. Systematic butchering of fallow deer (Dama) at the early Middle Pleistocene Acheulian site of Gesher Benot Ya’aqov (Israel). Journal of Human Evolution 54, 134-149.
- Gaudzinski, S., 2005. Monospecific or species-dominated faunal assemblages during the Middle Palaeolithic in Europe. In: E. Hovers, S. Kuhn (Eds.), Transitions before the Transition. Evolution and stability in the Middle Paleolithic and Middle Stone Age. Springer, New York, 137-147.
- Gaudzinski, S., Turner, E., Anzidei, A.P., Álvarez-Fernández, E., Arroyo-Cabrales, J., Cinq-Mars, J., Dobosi, V.T., Hannus, A., Johnson, E., Münzel, S.C., Scheer, A., Villa, P., 2005. The use of proboscidean remains in every day Palaeolithic life. Quaternary International 126-128, 179-194.
- Gamble, C., Gaudzinski, S., 2005. Bones and powerful individuals: faunal case studies from the Arctic and the European Middle Palaeolithic. In: Gamble, C., Porr, M. (Eds.), The hominid individual in context. Routledge Taylor Francis, London, 154-175.
- Kahlke, R.-D., Gaudzinski, S., 2005. The blessing of a great flood. Differentiation of mortality patterns in the large mammal record of the Lower Pleistocene fluvial site of Untermassfeld (Germany) and its relevance for the interpretation of faunal assemblages from archaeological sites. Journal of Archaeological Science 32, 1202-1222.
- Gaudzinski, S., Street, M., 2003. Reconsidering hunting specialisation in the German Magdalenian faunal record. In: Costamagno, S., Laroulandie, V. (Eds.), Mode de vie au Magdalénien: apports de l'Archéozoologie. BAR Int. Ser., Oxford, 11-21.
- Gaudzinski, S., Roebroeks, W., 2000. Adults only: Reindeer hunting at the Middle Palaeolithic site Salzgitter Lebenstedt, Northern Germany. Journal of Human Evolution 38, 497-521.
- Gaudzinski, S., 1999. Middle Palaeolithic bone tools from the open-air site Salzgitter-Lebenstedt (Germany). Journal of Archaeological Science 26, 125-141.
- Gaudzinski, S., 1998. Large mammal hunting strategies in the Palaeolithic of Europe: a taphonomic approach. In: Bayley, J. (Ed.), Science in Archaeology. An agenda for the future. English Heritage, London, 47-62.
- Gaudzinski, S., 1996. On Bovid Assemblages and their consequences for the knowledge of subsistence patterns in the Middle Palaeolithic. Proceedings of the Prehistoric Society 62, 19-39.
- Gaudzinski, S., Bittmann, F., Boenigk, W., Frechen, M., van Kolfschoten, T., 1996. Palaeoecology and Archaeology of the Kärlich-Seeufer Open-Air Site (Middle Pleistocene) in the Central Rhineland, Germany. Quaternary Research 46, 319-334.
- Gaudzinski, S., 1995. Wallertheim Revisited: a Re-analysis of the Fauna from the Middle Palaeolithic Site of Wallertheim (Rheinhessen/Germany). Journal of Archaeological Science 22, 51-66.
