= Laacher See =

Volcanic crater lake in western Germany

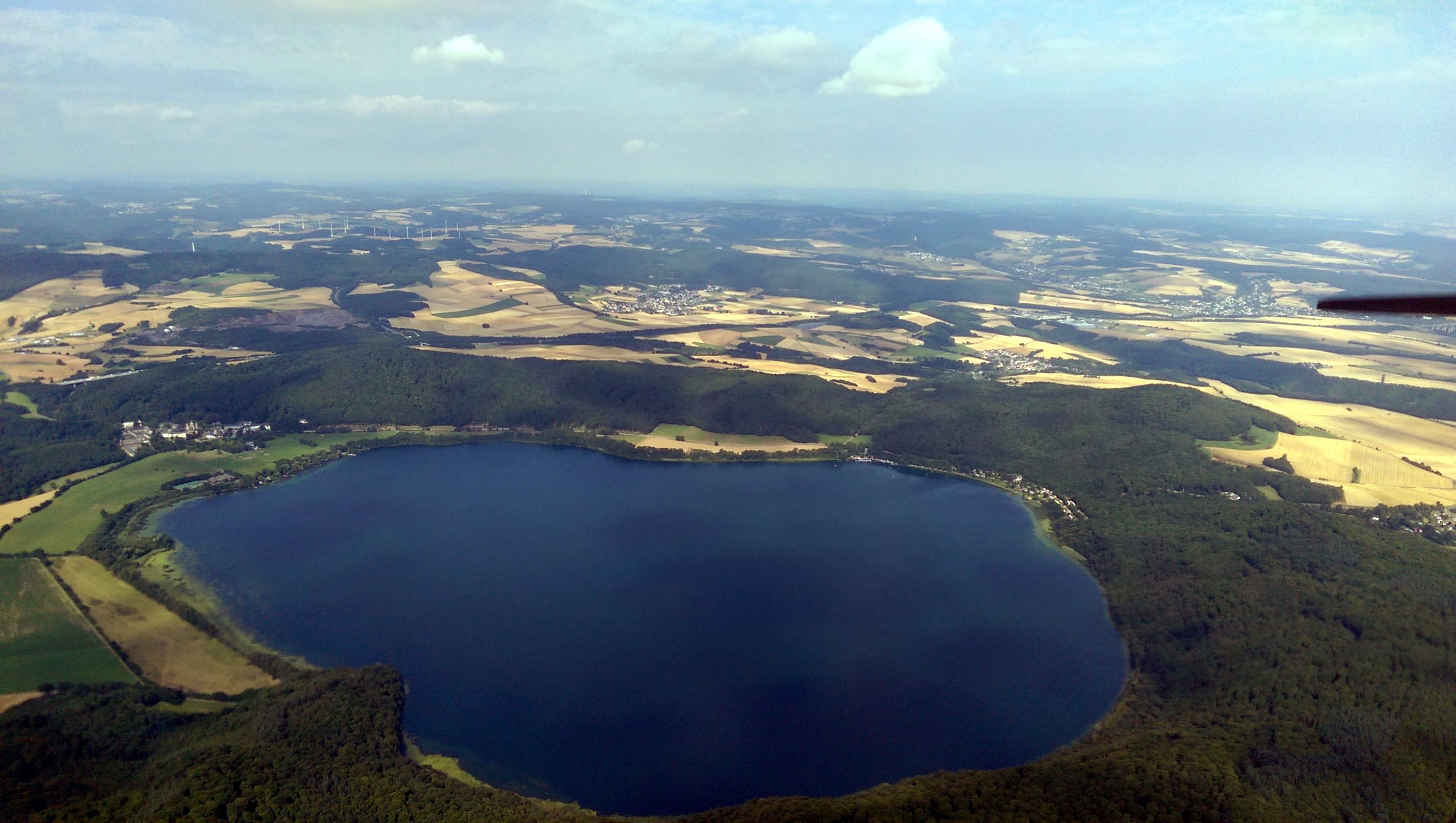
- Laacher See from the east

- Location in Germany Laacher See (Germany)
- Location: Ahrweiler, Rhineland-Palatinate
- Coordinates: 50°24′45″N 07°16′12″E
- Type: Volcanic crater lake
- Primary inflows: None
- Primary outflows: Fulbert-Stollen (canal)
- Basin countries: Germany
- Max. length: 1.964 km (1.220 mi)
- Max. width: 1.186 km (0.737 mi)
- Surface area: 3.31 km^{2} (1.28 sq mi)
- Average depth: 31 m (102 ft)
- Max. depth: 51 m (167 ft)
- Water volume: 1.03 km^{3} (0.25 mi^{3})
- Shore length^{1}: 7.3 km (4.5 mi)
- Surface elevation: 275 m (902 ft)
- Islands: None
- ^{1} Shore length is not a well-defined measure.

Laacher See (German pronunciation: [ˈlaːxɐ ˈzeː]), also known as Lake Laach or Laach Lake, is a volcanic crater lake with a diameter of 2 km (1.2 mi) in Rhineland-Palatinate, Germany, about 24 km (15 mi) northwest of Koblenz, 37 km (23 mi) south of Bonn, and 8 km (5.0 mi) west of Andernach. It is in the Eifel mountain range, and is part of the East Eifel volcanic field within the larger Volcanic Eifel. The lake was formed by a Plinian eruption approximately 13,000 years BP with a Volcanic Explosivity Index (VEI) of 6, similar to the Pinatubo eruption of 1991. The eruption was followed by a caldera collapse, in which the lake formed. The volcanic discharge observable as mofettas on the southeastern shore of the lake is a sign of dormant volcanism.

== Description ==
The lake is oval in shape and surrounded by high banks. The lava was quarried for millstones from the Roman period until the introduction of iron rollers for grinding grain. The water level has considerable rises and falls as the lake has no natural outlet.

On the western side lies the Benedictine Maria Laach Abbey (Abbatia Lacensis), founded in 1093 by Henry II of Laach of the House of Luxembourg, first Count Palatine of the Rhine,

During the second world war a Halifax bomber was shot down and crashed into the lake, settling on the bottom.

== The eruption ==
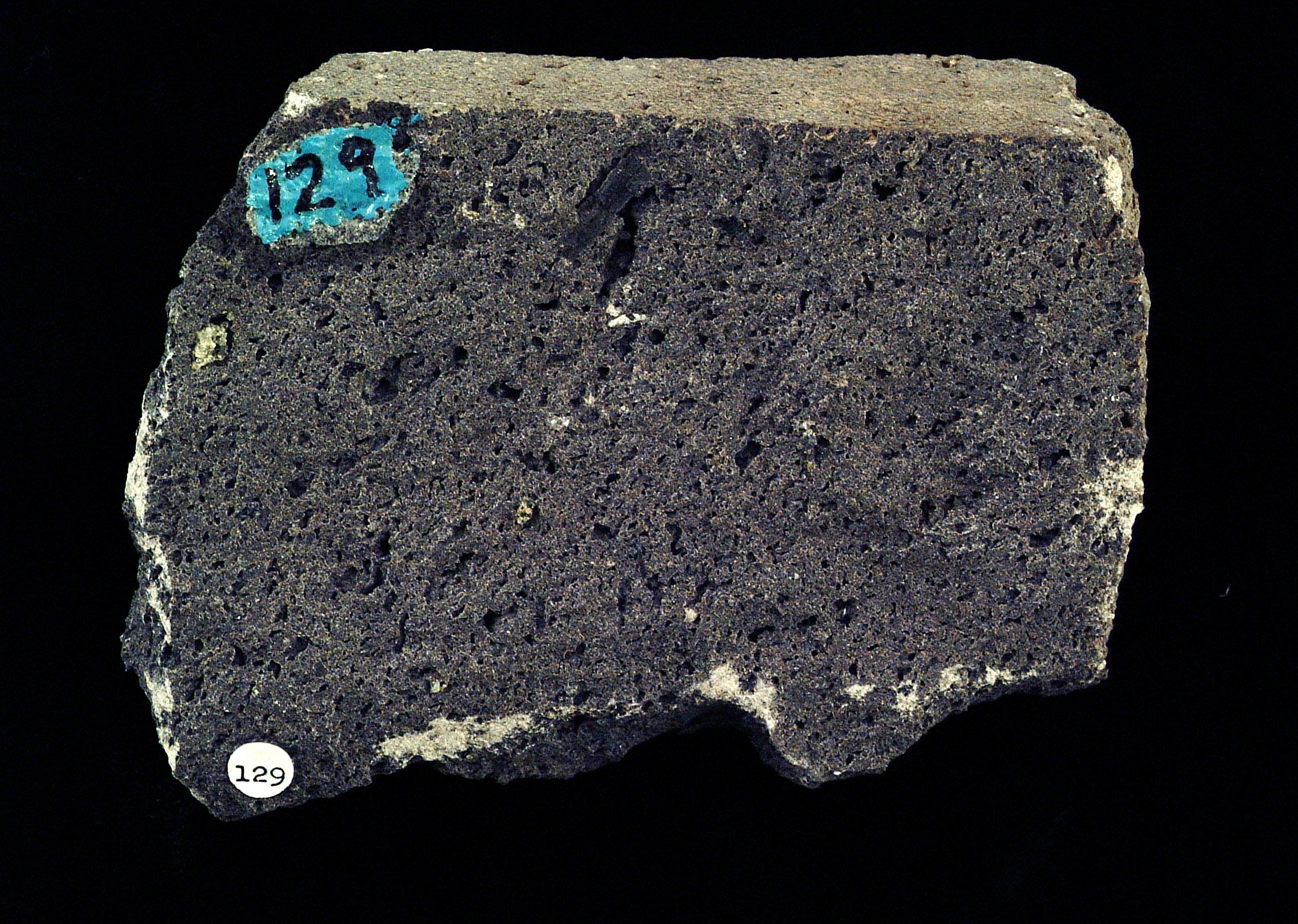
Sample of tephrite lava erupted at Laacher See about 13,000 years ago

Volcanism in Germany can be traced back for millions of years, related to the development of the European Cenozoic Rift System, which was caused by the collision between the African and Eurasian plates. Yet, the Eifel volcanism, which started in the East Eifel volcanic field around 450,000 BC, is the result of a hotspot.

The initial blasts of Laacher See, which took place in late spring or early summer at around 11,000 BC, flattened trees up to four kilometres away. The magma opened a route to the surface that erupted for about ten hours, with the plume probably reaching a height of 35 kilometres. Activity continued for several weeks or months, producing pyroclastic currents that covered valleys up to ten kilometres away with sticky tephra. Near the crater, deposits reach over fifty metres in thickness, and even five kilometres away they are still ten metres thick. All plants and animals for a distance of about sixty kilometres to the northeast and forty kilometres to the southeast must have been wiped out. An estimated 6 km^{3} (1.4 cu mi) of magma erupted, producing around 16 km^{3} (3.8 cu mi) of tephra. This 'huge' Plinian eruption thus had a Volcanic Explosivity Index (VEI) of 6.

Tephra deposits from the eruption dammed the Rhine, creating a 140 km^{2} (50 sq mi) lake. When the dam broke, an outburst flood swept downstream, leaving deposits as far away as Bonn. The fallout has been identified in an area of more than 300,000 square kilometres, stretching from central France to northern Italy and from southern Sweden to Poland, making it an invaluable tool for chronological correlation of archaeological and palaeoenvironmental layers across the area.

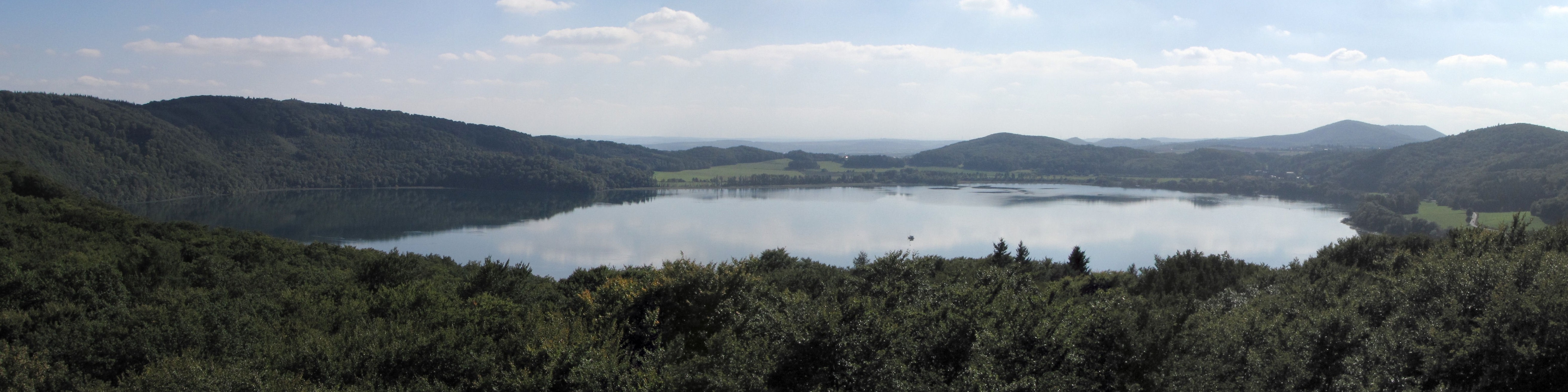
Panorama of the Laacher See

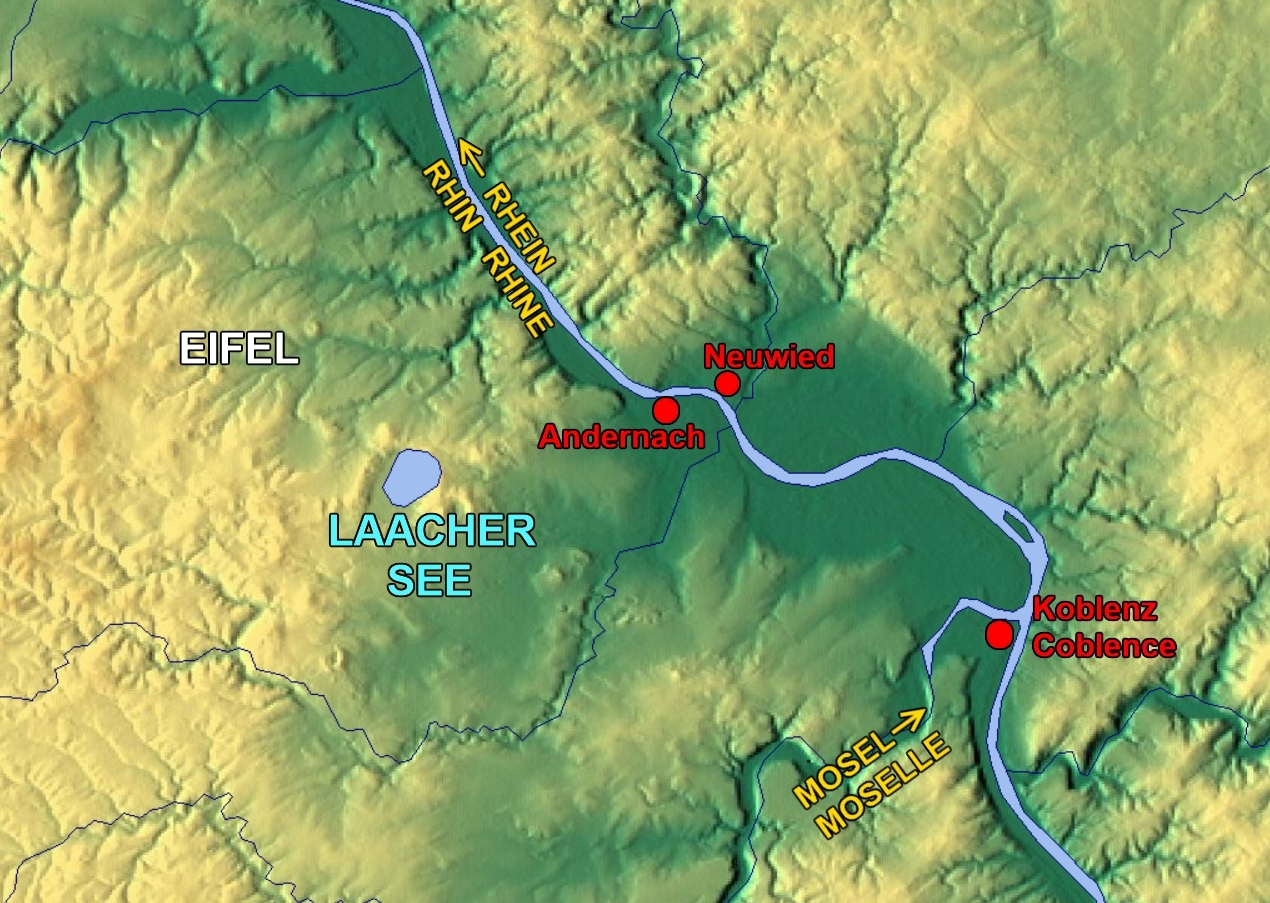
Topographic map of the vicinity of the Laacher See

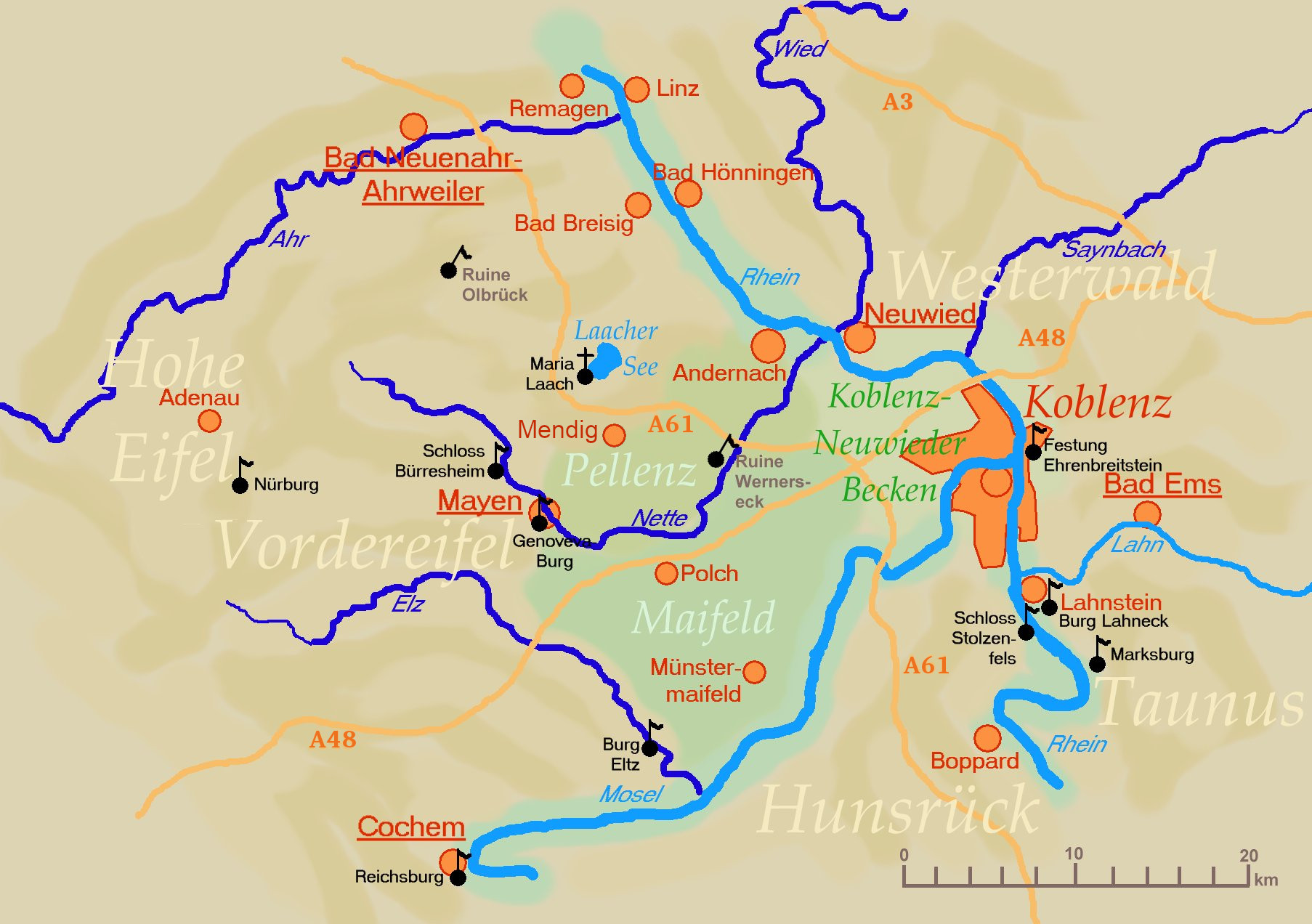
Map of regions in the vicinity of the Laacher See

== Aftermath of the eruption ==
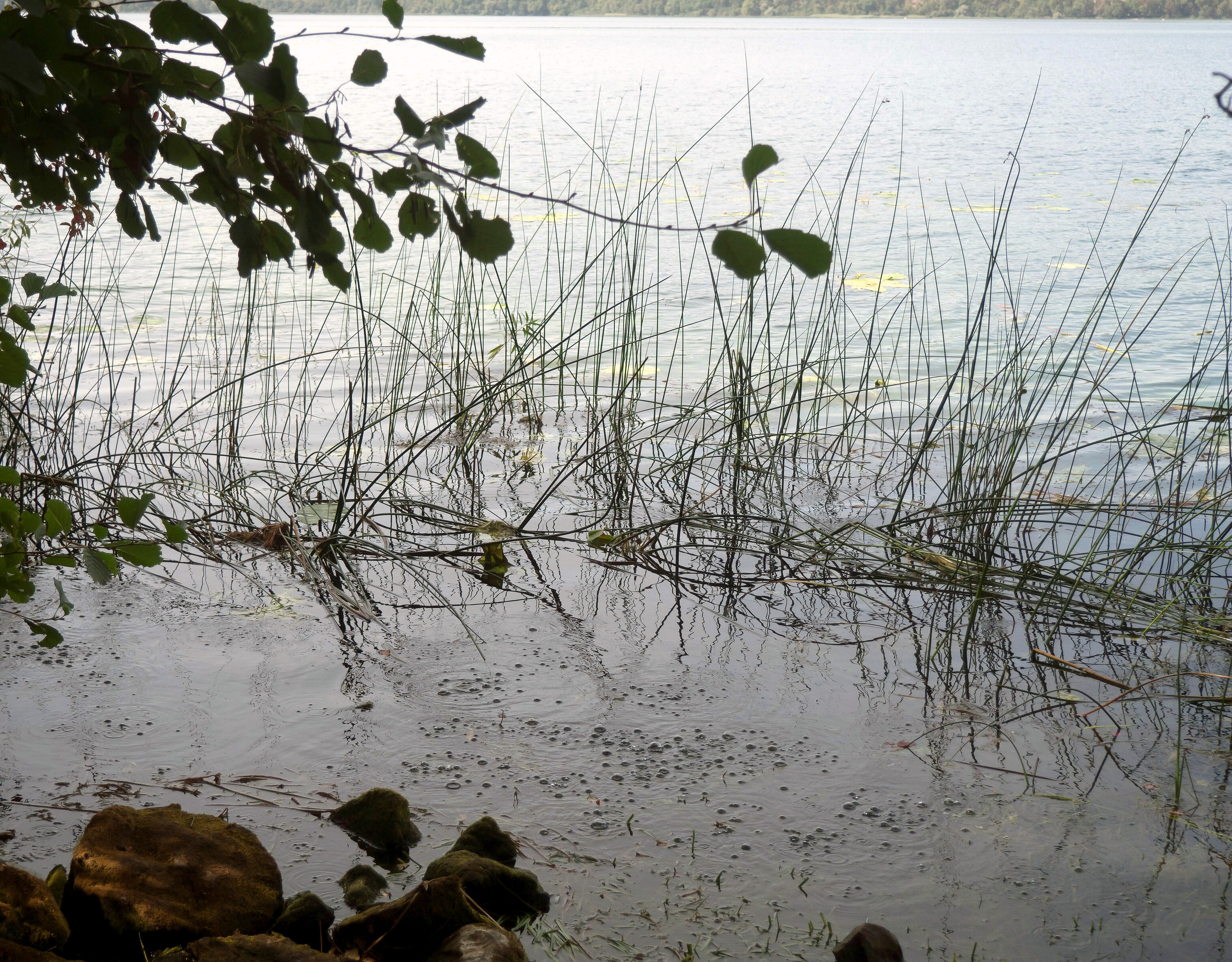
Mofettas on the southeastern shore of the Laacher See

The wider effects of the eruption were limited, amounting to several years of cold summers and up to two decades of environmental disruption in Germany. However, the lives of the local population, known as the Federmesser culture, were disrupted. Before the eruption, they were a sparsely distributed people who subsisted by foraging and hunting, using both spears and bows and arrows. According to archaeologist Felix Riede, after the eruption the area most affected by the fallout, the Thuringian Basin occupied by the Federmesser, appears to have been largely depopulated, whereas populations in southwest Germany and France increased. Two new cultures, the Bromme of southern Scandinavia and the Perstunian of northeast Europe emerged. These cultures had a lower level of toolmaking skills than the Federmesser, particularly the Bromme who appear to have lost the bow and arrow technology. In Riede's view the decline was a result of the disruption caused by the Laacher See volcano.

The eruption was discussed as a possible cause for the Younger Dryas, a period of global cooling near the end of the last glacial maximum that appeared to coincide with the time of the Laacher See eruption. A new radiocarbon date for the eruption, published in 2021, suggested that the Younger Dryas began about 130 years after the eruption, though this new date was challenged as having perhaps been affected by radiocarbon dead magmatic carbon, which was not accounted for and would have made the date appear too old. The current best estimates for the age of the Laacher See eruption are 12,880 ± 40 years BP or 13,006 ± 9 calibrated years before present, depending on whether the radiocarbon date was affected by magmatic carbon dioxide. If the date was affected by magmatic carbon dioxide, the Laacher See eruption would then have occurred immediately before the onset of the Younger Dryas Event, and could have acted as a trigger. If the radiocarbon-derived date of 13,006 calibrated years before present is correct, the Laacher See eruption may have still affected climate as part of a large cluster of volcanic events happening in the 130 years immediately before the event, though it would not have immediately preceded the event.

== See also ==
- List of volcanoes in Germany
