= Thomas Boynton (antiquarian) =

British antiquarian (died November 1919)

Thomas Boynton FSA FSA Scot
- Born: 1832
- Died: 1919 (aged 86–87)
- Occupation: Antiquarian

Thomas Boynton FSA FSA Scot (died 1919) was a British antiquarian from Bridlington.

== Biography ==
Until 1880 Boynton was a farmer. When drainage works ran through his farmland near Holderness in 1880, he identified and subsequently excavated a series of Prehistoric settlements. These discoveries were initially reported in several newspaper articles between 1883 and 1885.

Boynton excavated the Iron Age cemetery site of Danes Graves, alongside William Greenwell and John Robert Mortimer, in 1897–1898.

Boynton served as a Vice-President of the Yorkshire Philosophical Society and as Honorary Curator of Antiquities. During his time as Honorary Curator he donated his collection of regional ceramics to the Yorkshire Museum and also acquired chariot wheels from the Arras Culture chariot-burial tradition for it. He served on the council of the Yorkshire Archaeological and Historical Society. He was elected as a Fellow of the Society of Antiquaries of Scotland in 1884, and a Fellow of the Society of Antiquaries of London in 1895.

== Select publications ==
- Boynton, T. 1887. "On the Bronze Implements found in the East Riding of Yorkshire", Proceedings of the Yorkshire Geological and Polytechnic Society 9, 426-427 doi:10.1144/pygs.9.3.426.
- Boynton, T. 1911. "Skipsea earthworks", Yorkshire Archaeological and Topographical Journal 21, 188-189.
