= Pre-Roman Britain =

Pre-Roman Britain may refer to:

- British Iron Age, the period immediately before the arrival of the Romans
- Prehistoric Britain in general
