= Thomas Boynton =

Thomas Boynton may refer to:

- Thomas Jefferson Boynton (1838–1871), American lawyer, journalist, and judge
- Thomas J. Boynton (politician) (1856–1945), U.S. political figure in Vermont and Massachusetts
- Thomas Boynton (MP) (1523–1582), Member of Parliament (MP) for Boroughbridge
- Thomas Boynton (antiquarian) (died 1919), Antiquarian from East Yorkshire
