= Archaeology of Ashdown Forest =

Historic remains in British forest

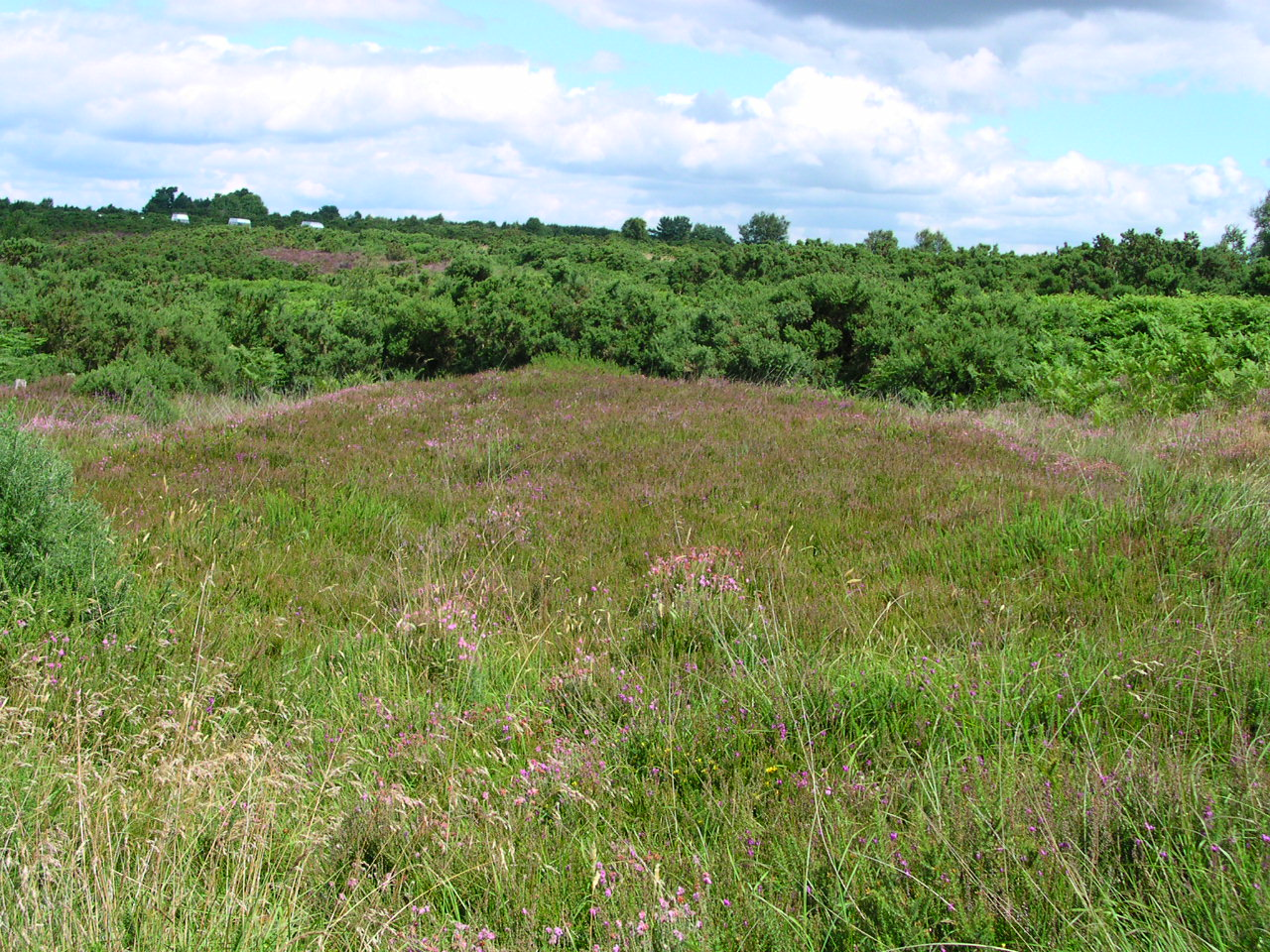
The agger of the London-Lewes Roman road, visible at Roman Road car park, Ashdown Forest.

Archaeology of Ashdown Forest refers to a wealth of archaeological findings in Ashdown Forest, south of London. Absence of ploughing, predominance of heathland and lack of building development have allowed archaeological sites to survive and remain visible. More than 570 such sites have been identified, including Bronze Age round barrows, Iron Age enclosures, prehistoric field systems, iron workings from Roman times onwards, the Pale, medieval and post-medieval pillow mounds for the rearing of rabbits, and a set of military kitchen mounds between Camp Hill and Nutley dating from 1793 that are among the only surviving ones in the United Kingdom. The earliest known trace of human activity in Ashdown Forest is a stone hand axe found near Gills Lap, which is thought to be about 50,000 years old. The vast majority of finds however date from the Mesolithic (11,000-7,000 BP) and onwards into the modern era.

== Cultural remains ==
=== Stone age ===
Occasional stone tools remain as evidence of an early culture.

=== Bronze age ===
Burial mounds, round barrows, are among the features still extant from the Bronze Age.

=== Iron age ===
The late pre-Roman Iron Age (100 BC to AD 43) saw a conspicuous reconfiguration of the settlement and economic geography of Sussex, of which one aspect was the disappearance of hill-forts from the South Downs (except Devil's Dyke) and the establishment of hill-forts in the High Weald, including one in Ashdown Forest at Garden Hill (see below). Three other hill-forts lie in close proximity at Philpots, Saxonbury and Dry Hill. The general consensus is that these hill-forts are associated with a more intensive exploitation of the iron resources of the Weald. This period also presents the first evidence for centralised ceramic production, with specialist pottery sites identified at Chelwood Gate and Horsted Keynes, both situated close to the Forest and ideally located to exploit the local potting clays. Elsewhere in Ashdown Forest there is evidence of Iron Age enclosures at Gills Lap, marked by a roundel of fir trees, and King's Standing, both situated on high hilltops. Another site, at Chelwood Gate, known as Danes Graves, shows evidence of late pre-Roman Iron Age iron working.

== Garden Hill site ==
Garden Hill, situated on a hill spur south of Colemans Hatch Road, is Ashdown Forest's most important scheduled monument, containing both an Iron Age hill-fort and the remains of an important Romano-British iron-working centre. In 1972 archaeologists uncovered a small but complete 2nd century AD Romano-British stone-built bath-house. Subsequent excavations produced evidence of Neolithic, Bronze Age and early pre-Roman occupation of the hill-top and uncovered remains of a late pre-Roman Iron Age and Romano-British iron-working settlement of the 1st, 2nd and early 3rd centuries AD. This included pre-Roman round houses, a rectangular 2nd-century Roman timber villa to which the bath building was attached, and an almost complete pane of Roman window-glass that was later acquired by the British Museum. Both iron-making (ore roasting and smelting) and iron-working (forging) were conducted, but this is likely to have been small in scale. Later the industrial workings were levelled and replaced by the villa and other buildings of a non-industrial character, suggesting that the settlement may have operated through the 2nd century more as a managerial centre for other iron-working sites nearby, such as the small early 1st-century bloomeries at Pippingford Park and Cow Park before probably becoming abandoned by the mid 3rd century. Garden Hill lies within the Ministry of Defence's Pippingford Park military training area and is not open to the public.

== Roman roads and pre-Roman trackways ==
The London to Lewes Way, one of three Roman roads that connected London with the important Wealden iron industry, crosses Ashdown Forest in a north-south direction. The road ran in a direct line from its junction with Watling Street at Peckham in London to the South Downs on the east side of Lewes, from where it connected with routes to the densely populated corn-growing areas of the South Downs and coastal plain, and possibly to ports trading with Roman-occupied Gaul. The main purpose of the road, apart from linking the corn-growing areas with London, was to open up Ashdown Forest and neighbouring iron-producing areas for the export of iron products to London and Gaul. Given the great importance of the iron industry to the Romans, it is likely that the road was built soon after the Roman occupation, not long after AD 100 or possibly earlier.

After crossing the Greensand Ridge the road runs virtually straight from Marlpit Hill southwards for 11 miles (18 km), entering Ashdown Forest near Chuck Hatch, reaching the top of the forest at Camp Hill, and then leaving the Forest via Duddleswell and Fairwarp. The agger varies in width (at Camp Hill it is 14 feet (4.3 m) wide, at Five Hundred Acre Wood, 17 feet (5.2 m) wide) and is metalled with compacted sandstone lumps and iron slag from local bloomeries. Unusually, side ditches 62 feet (19 m) apart run continuously for two miles (3 km) through the forest. The remains of the road in the Forest were partly obliterated by tanks undertaking training exercises in World War II, but part of it is clearly marked out at Roman Road car park.

A secondary Roman road which passed through Wych Cross and Colemans Hatch reached the London-Lewes trunk road at Gallypot Street, Hartfield, and would probably have served to link the Romano-British iron-working complex at Garden Hill to the main road.

The north-south London-Lewes Roman road superseded an older trackway that ran from Titsey, at the foot of the Greensand Ridge, through the iron-age hillfort at Dry Hill, Forest Row, Danehill and Wivelsfield to Westmeston, at the foot of the South Downs. Across the Weald ran many old, broadly east-west trackways that followed the relatively lightly wooded high sandy ridges. Some of these, particularly in iron-producing areas, would have formed part of the road network used by the Romans. Among the important trackways that crossed Ashdown Forest were ridgeways from Crowborough and Nutley that clearly followed the high ridges of the Forest to Chelwood Gate and Wych Cross, and which then continued westwards to West Hoathly, Selsfield, Turners Hill and beyond.
