= Prehistoric Britain =

Prehistoric human occupation of Britain

Several species of humans have intermittently occupied Great Britain for almost a million years. The earliest evidence of human occupation around 900,000 years ago is at Happisburgh on the Norfolk coast, with stone tools and now destroyed footprints possibly made by Homo antecessor or Homo erectus. The oldest human fossils, around 480,000 years old, are of "Boxgrove Man" (possibly Homo heidelbergensis) from the Boxgrove site in Sussex. Until that time, Britain had been permanently connected to the Continent by a chalk ridge between South East England and northern France called the Weald–Artois Anticline, but during the Anglian Glaciation around 425,000 years ago a megaflood broke through the ridge, and Britain became increasingly isolated from continental Europe, until fully becoming an island around 130,000 years ago.

During the Lower Palaeolithic and Middle Palaeolithic, Britain was primarily inhabited by humans during warm interglacial periods, when Britain exhibited a temperate climate similar to modern times, alongside animals such as the straight-tusked elephant, lion (Panthera fossilis), cave hyenas, and Stephanorhinus rhinoceroses. Fossils of very early Neanderthals dating to around 400,000 years ago have been found at the Swanscombe site in Kent, and of classic Neanderthals about 225,000 years old at Pontnewydd in Wales. Britain was unoccupied by humans between 180,000 and 60,000 years ago, when Neanderthals returned. By 40,000 years ago they had become extinct and modern humans had reached Britain. But even their occupations were brief and intermittent due to a climate which swung between low temperatures with a tundra habitat and severe ice ages which made Britain uninhabitable for long periods. The last of these, the Younger Dryas, ended around 11,700 years ago, and since then Britain has been continuously occupied.

Traditionally it was claimed by academics that a post-glacial land bridge existed between Britain and Ireland; however, this conjecture began to be refuted by a consensus within the academic community starting in 1983, and since 2006 the idea of a land bridge has been disproven based upon conclusive marine geological evidence. It is now concluded that an ice bridge existed between Britain and Ireland up until 16,000 years ago, but this had melted by around 14,000 years ago. Britain was at this time still joined to the Continent by a land bridge known as Doggerland, but due to rising sea levels this causeway of dry land would have become a series of estuaries, inlets and islands by 7000 BC, and by 6200 BC, it would have become completely submerged.

Located at the fringes of Europe, Britain received European technological and cultural developments much later than Southern Europe and the Mediterranean region did during prehistory. By around 4000 BC, the island was populated by people with a Neolithic culture. This Neolithic population, like other European Neolithic farmers, drew the majority of their ancestry from the earliest farming communities in Anatolia, indicating that a major migration accompanied farming. The beginning of the Bronze Age and the Bell Beaker culture was marked by an even greater population turnover, this time displacing more than 90% of Britain's neolithic ancestry in the process. This is documented by studies of ancient DNA which demonstrate that the immigrants had large amounts of Bronze-Age Eurasian Steppe ancestry, associated with the spread of Indo-European languages and the Yamnaya culture.

No written language of the pre-Roman inhabitants of Britain is known; therefore, the history, culture and way of life of pre-Roman Britain are known mainly through archaeological finds. Archaeological evidence demonstrates that ancient Britons were involved in extensive maritime trade and cultural links with the rest of Europe from the Neolithic onwards, especially by exporting tin that was in abundant supply. Although the main evidence for the period is archaeological, available genetic evidence is increasing, and views of British prehistory are evolving accordingly. Julius Caesar's first invasion of Britain in 55 BC is regarded as the start of recorded protohistory although some historical information is available from before then.

== Stone Age ==
=== Palaeolithic ===
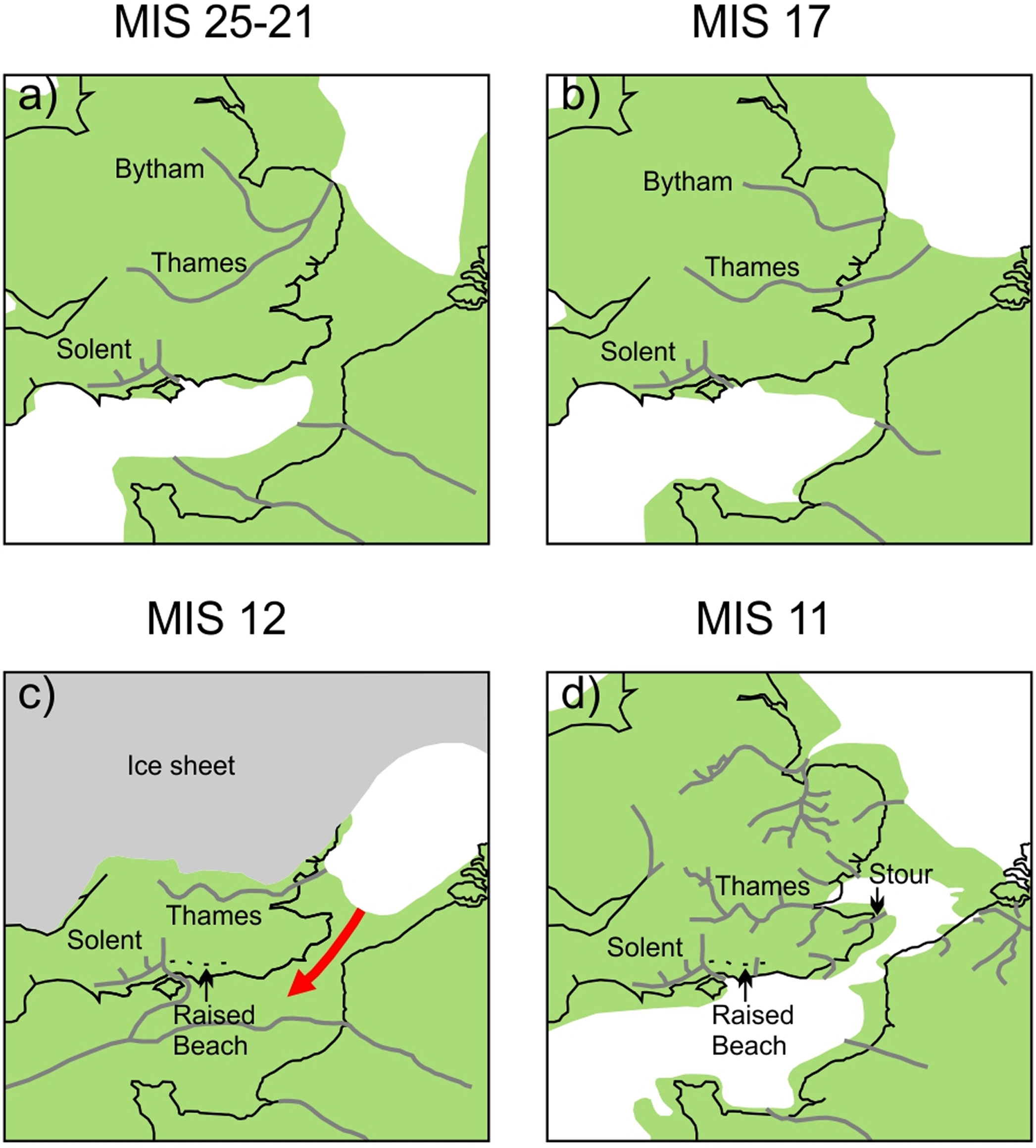
Early stages of the formation of the English Channel, spanning from Marine Isotope Stages (MIS) 25-21 (prior to 900,000 years ago) to the proglacial lake during the Anglian Glaciation (MIS 12 c. 480-430,000 years ago) to the situation during the following Hoxnian interglacial (MIS 11, c. 425-375,000 years ago)

Palaeolithic (Old Stone Age) Britain is the period of the earliest known occupation of Britain by humans. The oldest known occupations of the island date to the end of the early Pleistocene, around 900,000 years ago. During the Palaeolithic, Britain was repeatedly colonised by archaic humans during temperate interglacial periods, before retreating during the harsh cold glacial periods. This process of colonisation and retreat is thought to have occurred at least 9 separate times. Habitation was intermittent, and even during periods of occupation may have reproduced below replacement level and needed immigration from elsewhere to maintain numbers. According to Paul Pettitt and Mark White:

The British Lower Palaeolithic (and equally that of much of northern Europe) is thus a long record of abandonment and colonisation, and a very short record of residency. The sad but inevitable conclusion of this must be that Britain has little role to play in any understanding of long-term human evolution and its cultural history is largely a broken record dependent on external introductions and insular developments that ultimately lead nowhere. Britain, therefore, was an island of the living dead.

Prior to around 130,000 years ago Britain was permanently a peninsula of mainland Europe, connected by chalk and clay rocks running across to northern France, allowing hominins to freely disperse into Britain. From around 500,000 years ago this land bridge began to erode, which was complete by around 130,000 years ago, resulting in Britain being an island during the Last Interglacial (130-115,000 years ago) and most the Holocene (from around 9,000 years ago), though it reconnected to Europe during Last Glacial Period (115,000-11,700 years ago) and remained connected into the early Holocene via Doggerland.

==== Lower Palaeolithic ====
===== Earliest occupations =====
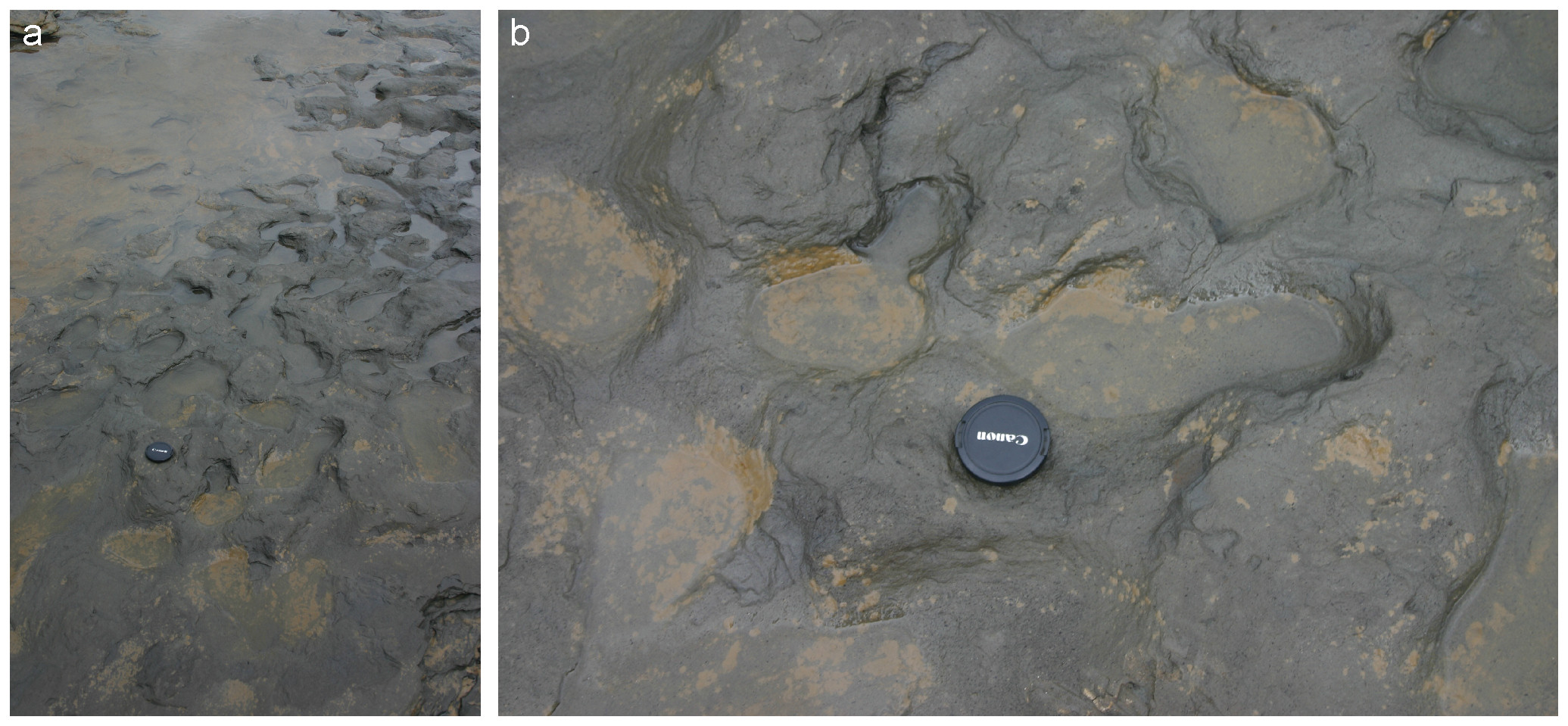
Photos of the ~900,000 year old Happisburgh footprints, taken shortly before their destruction

There is evidence from animal bones and flint tools found in coastal deposits near Happisburgh in Norfolk that early humans were present in Britain over 800,000 years ago. Paleomagnetic analysis shows that the sediments in which the stone tools were found have a reversed polarity which means they are over 780,000 years old, prior to the Brunhes–Matuyama reversal. The evidence is that the early humans were there towards the end of an interglacial during that date range. There are two candidate interglacials - one between 970,000 and 935,000 years ago and the second from 865,000 and 815,000 years ago. Numerous footprints of equivalent age to the tools were found on the beach at Happisburgh in 2013 of a mixed group of adult males, females and children. No human fossils have been found at Happisburgh. It has been tentatively proposed that Homo antecessor is the most likely candidate species of ancient human as there are remains of roughly the same age at Gran Dolina at Atapuerca, northern Spain, though a later 2020 study noted that the footprints were similar to those made by Homo erectus.

Summer temperatures at Happisburgh were an average of 16 to 17 °C (61 to 63 °F) and average winter temperatures were slightly colder than present day temperatures, around freezing point or just below. Conditions were comparable to present-day southern Scandinavia. During this time, the area was inhabited by species such as the temperate adapted mammoth Mammuthus meridionalis, the equine Equus suessenbornensis and the giant moose ancestor Cervalces latifrons.

Chronologically, the next evidence of human occupation is at Pakefield on the outskirts of Lowestoft in Suffolk 48 kilometres (30 mi) south of Happisburgh, dating to an interglacial period around 700,000 years ago (Marine Isotope Stages 19-17), with lithic artefacts showing a core and flake industry. This site is in the vicinity of the lower Bytham river, and not the Thames which had now moved further south. Pakefield had mild winters and warm summers with average July temperatures of between 18 and 23 °C (64 and 73 °F). There were wet winters and drier summers. Animal bones found in the area include those of animals such as the steppe mammoth (Mammuthus trogontherii), the extinct hippo Hippopotamus antiquus, the rhinoceros Stephanorhinus hundsheimensis, the giant deer Praemegaceros dawkinsi, the deer Megaloceros savini, the bison Bison cf. schoetensacki, the enormous lion Panthera fossilis, Crocuta hyenas related to the living spotted hyena (Crocuta crocuta), grey wolf (Canis lupus) and the sabertooth cat Homotherium. Flakes from Fakenham Magna in Suffolk may also represent evidence of an occupation of Britain during MIS 19.

===== Acheulean =====
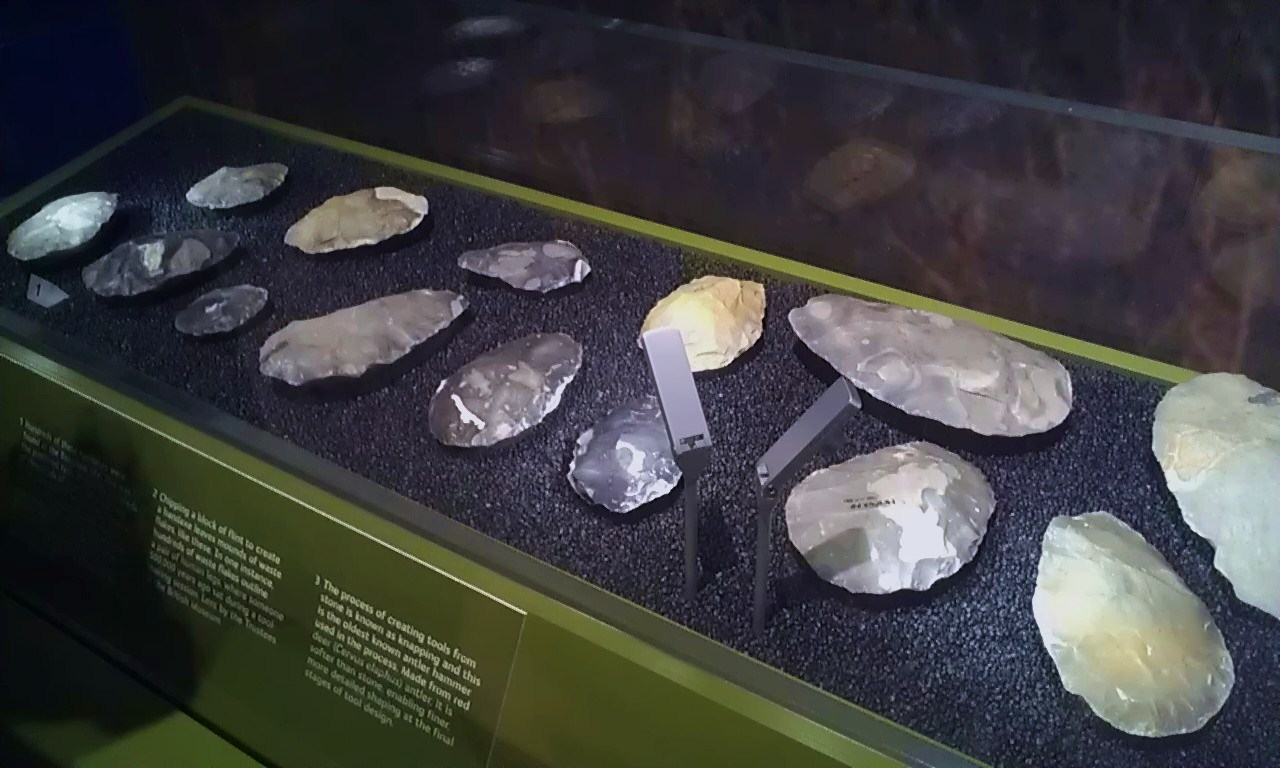
Display of ovate handaxes from the Boxgrove site, dating to around 480,000 years ago

The oldest possible Acheulean industry site utilizing handaxes in Britain is Fordwich Pit near Canterbury, Kent, with a 2025 study suggesting that the earliest occupation at the site to dates MIS 17-16, around 712–621,000 years ago, though other authors have expressed skepticism due to the handaxes being recovered without adequate documentation, and suggested that the earliest handaxes at the site may date to MIS 15 instead, consistent with other British sites. Archaic humans are suggested to have been present in Britain during MIS 15, around 620-560,000 years ago, as evidenced by handaxes found in several sites on the former Bytham River in eastern England such as Brandon Fields and Maidscross Hill, as well as elsewhere in England. The oldest skeletal remains of humans in Britain are of "Boxgrove Man", comprising a tibia and two incisor teeth from the lower jaw, suggested to represent remains of Homo heidelbergensis, collected from the Boxgrove site in West Sussex, dating to around 480,000 years ago at the end of Marine Isotope Stage 13. This site has also provided abundant evidence of human activity, including lithic artefacts of an Acheulean industry with highly refined ovate handaxes, as well as an animal butchery, including of rhinoceroses (Stephanorhinus hundsheimensis), deer, bear (Ursus deiningeri) and horses, that occurred during a warm interglacial in coastal, grassland and forest environments. Boxgrove-type ovate handaxes are also found at other sites in Britain of MIS 13 age, as distant as East Anglia, and show a great increase in knapping skill over the much more crude handaxes found in Fordwich Pit and MIS 15 deposits.

The extreme cold of the following Anglian Stage (Marine Isotope Stage 12) was previously thought to have driven humans out of Britain altogether. The discovery of sharp, unworn stone tools sandwiched between two Anglian sediment layers at Fordwich Pit in Kent, however, suggests at least some human populations visited Britain during this ice age, perhaps during a relatively warm interstadial period although probably not when glaciers reached their southern limit 65 kilometres (40 mi) north of Old Park.

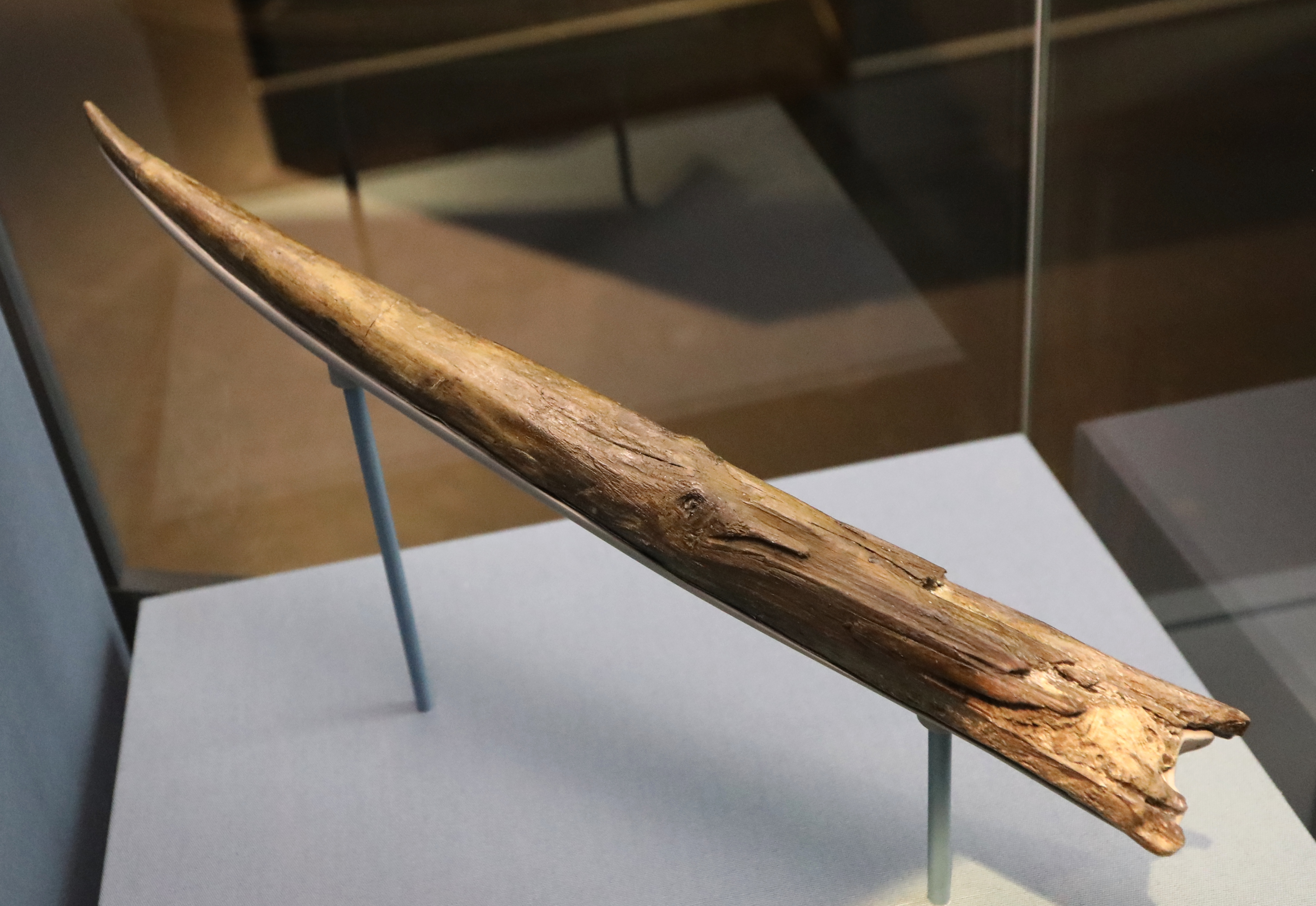
The Clacton spearhead, found near Clacton-on-sea, is the oldest known wooden weapon, at approximately 400,000 years old.

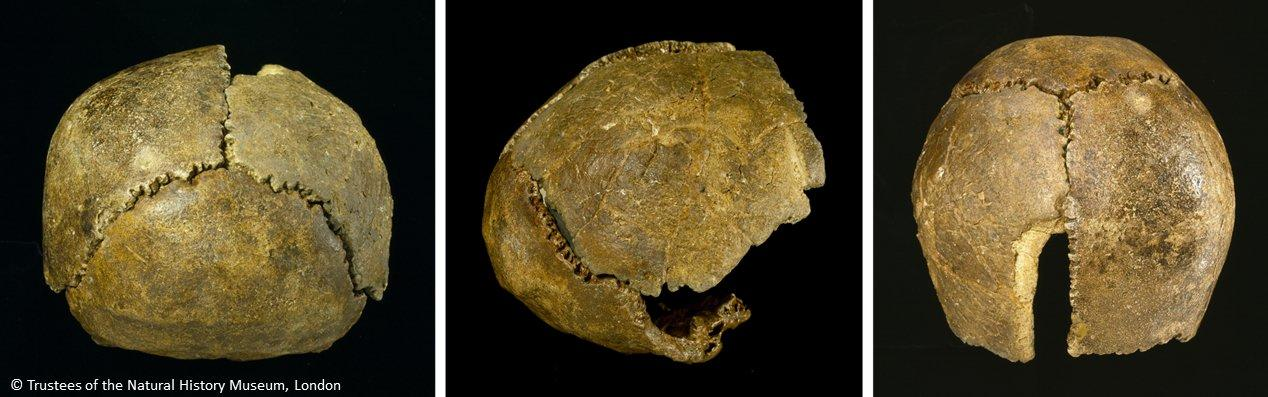
The "Swanscombe skull", dating to c. 400,000 years ago

The warmer, largely interglacial Hoxnian Stage (Marine Isotope Stage 11) which followed the Anglian Glaciation, lasted from around 424,000 until 374,000 years ago initially saw the emergence of the Clactonian flint tool industry in places such as Clacton-on-sea in Essex and Swanscombe quarry in Kent. The Clactonian industry is distinguished from the Acheulean by its lack of use of handaxes. At Ebbsfleet near Swanscombe, the skeleton of a straight-tusked elephant (Palaeoloxodon antiquus), a gigantic species of elephant formerly native to Britain during interglacial periods, was found associated with Clactonian tools that were used to butcher it. The Clacton spearhead, the oldest wooden weapon known anywhere in the world, is known from Hoxnian sediments near Clacton-on sea. Around 415,000 years ago, the Clactonian industry was replaced by an Acheulean industry using handaxes, which may represent a colonisation event that replaced the people using Clactonian tools. Multiple distinct cultural groups appear to have existed contemporaneously in different parts of Britain during the handaxe-producing part of the Hoxnian, as evidenced by distinct regional handaxe shape traditions in the Thames Basin and East Anglia. The Hoxnian is also known for the remains of "Swanscombe Man", the partial of skull of an archaic human, suggested to represent an early Neanderthal. The Hoxnian-aged adjacent sites of Barnham and Beeches Pit show among the oldest known evidence for the deliberate making of fire.

==== Neanderthals (Middle Palaeolithic) ====
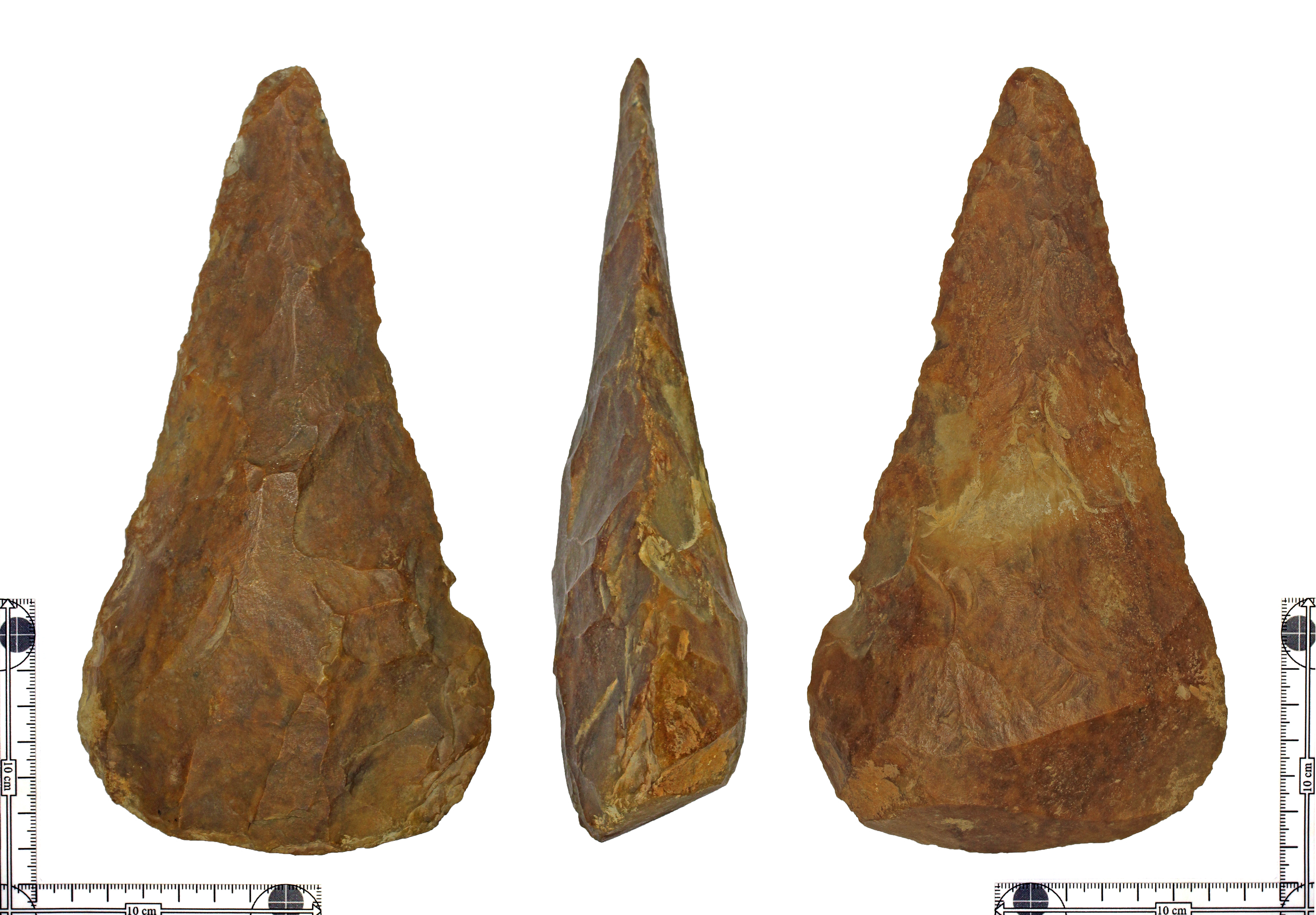
Lower Palaeolithic "ficron"-type handaxe found in Dorset, a type of handaxe typical of the Purfleet interglacial (MIS 9)

Following a likely abandonment of Britain during MIS 10 glacial period, Neanderthals reappeared in Britain from around 330,000 years ago. Evidence has been found for the butchery of large mammals by Neanderthals in Britain during the Purfleet Interglacial (MIS 9) around 350-300,000 years ago, such as the narrow-nosed rhinoceros (Stephanorhinus hemitoechus), Merck's rhinoceros (Stephanorhinus kirchbergensis), brown bear (Ursus arctos), bison and horse. MIS 9 (which initially began with another handaxe-less culture similar to the Clactonian) is known for the production of unusually large "giant handaxes", as well as pointed "ficron" handaxes, though in contrast to MIS 11 the stone tool cultural tradition appears have been relatively uniform across Britain. The youngest evidence of an Acheulean industry with handaxes in Britain dates to around 250,000 years ago (late MIS 8), from Harnham, Wiltshire. Neanderthals practicing a Mousterian industry utilizing advanced Levallois stoneknapping techniques appear in Britain during late MIS 8 (by around 240,000 years ago), considerably later than continental Europe where it appears around 320,000 years ago, suggesting that the technology was brought by new migrants from the continent, marking the beginning of the Middle Palaeolithic in Britain. Remains of early Neanderthals associated with Levallois stone tools have been discovered at Pontnewydd Cave in Wales, dated to 225,000 years ago (MIS 7).

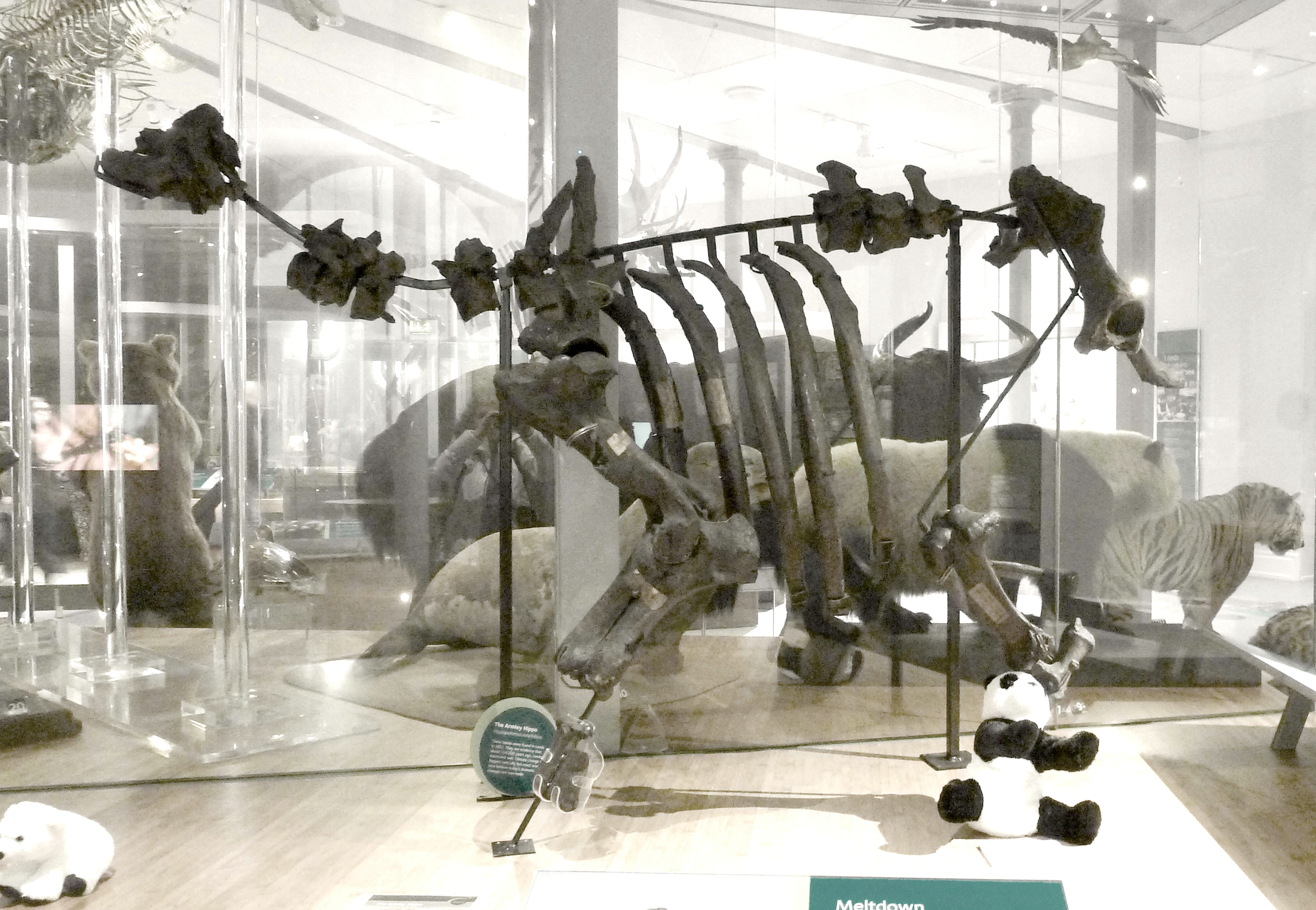
Skeleton of the Armley Hippo on display in Leeds near where it was found. A specimen of the modern hippopotamus, it dates to the Last Interglacial (Ipswichian) c. 130-115,000 years ago, when hippos were widespread across much of Britain

Neanderthals were absent from Britain during the Penultimate Glacial Period (MIS 6) from around 180,000 years ago. The Last Interglacial, locally called the Ipswichian in Britain and the Eemian elsewhere in northern Europe, occurred around 130-115,000 years ago. During this time Britain was uninhabited by humans, but inhabited by large animals, similar to previous interglacial periods, such the living hippopotamus (Hippopotamus amphibius), was widespread across Britain, reaching northwards to Stockton-on-Tees, the straight-tusked elephant (Palaeoloxodon antiquus), the narrow nosed rhinoceros, Irish elk, bison, cave lions (Panthera spelaea) and cave hyenas (Crocuta spelaea).

It has been generally argued that Neanderthals were not present in Britain again until the MIS 4-3 transition during the Last Glacial Period around 60,000 years ago. However finds from Great Pan Farm on the Isle of Wight have led to suggestions that Neanderthals may have been present in Britain already by 115-84,000 years ago, during the early Last Glacial Period in early MIS 5. Britain had its own unique variety of late Neanderthal handaxe, the bout-coupé. La Cotte de St Brelade in Jersey is the only site in the British Isles to have produced late Neanderthal fossils, with the site preserving evidence of butchery and possibly hunting of woolly mammoth (Mammuthus primigenius) and woolly rhinoceros (Coelodonta antiquitatis) by Neanderthals. Neanderthals are suggested to have become extinct in Britain by around 40,000 years ago.

==== Modern human occupation (Upper Palaeolithic) ====
The earliest evidence for modern humans in the British Isles is an upper jawbone discovered in Kents Cavern, Devon, in 1927, which was re-dated in 2011 to between 41,000 and 44,000 years old, marking the beginning of the Upper Palaeolithic in Britain. Initial Upper Palaeolithic stone tools in Britain produced by modern humans are assigned to the Lincombian–Ranisian–Jerzmanowician (LRJ) culture, which are probably around 45-40,000 years old.

Stone tools found at a handful of sites across England and Wales indicate that Britain was occupied by Aurignacian peoples, probably beginning no later than 37,000 years ago, which may represent a number of distinct occupations. The most famous example of a human skeleton from the British Upper Palaeolithic is the "Red Lady of Paviland", an ochre covered skeleton of a man (rather than a woman as previously thought) in coastal South Wales, which was dated in 2010 to be around 34,000 years old. Rare early Gravettian-type tanged stone points found in a handful of localities across England and southern Wales, assigned to the "Maiserian" industry, probably date to around 33-32,000 years ago based on the age of the Maisieres-Canal site in Belgium which has very similar artifacts. The glacial advances in northern Britain and highland Wales and broader climatic deterioration in Britain in the run-up to the Last Glacial Maximum made Britain uninhabitable for humans, and they were probably absent from Britain by 28,000 years ago. Humans associated with Magdalenian cultures recolonised Britain around 15,000 years ago, following the return of more favourable climatic conditions around the beginning of the Bølling–Allerød Interstadial. Woolly mammoths likely survived in Britain at least up until the beginning of the interstadial, around 14,500-14,000 years ago.

The earliest known site of human presence in Scotland is the Howburn Farm encampment near Biggar, South Lanarkshire, which is dated to around 14,500 to 14,000 years ago, and is associated with the reindeer hunting Hamburgian culture. Gough's Cave, Somerset which was occupied by humans around 14,700 years ago, preserves evidence of cannibalism, suggested to represent ritual funerary endocannibalism, and the modification of skulls into skull cups. The people occupying Gough's Cave likely had a diet heavily relying on large animals such as red deer, wild horse and bovines.

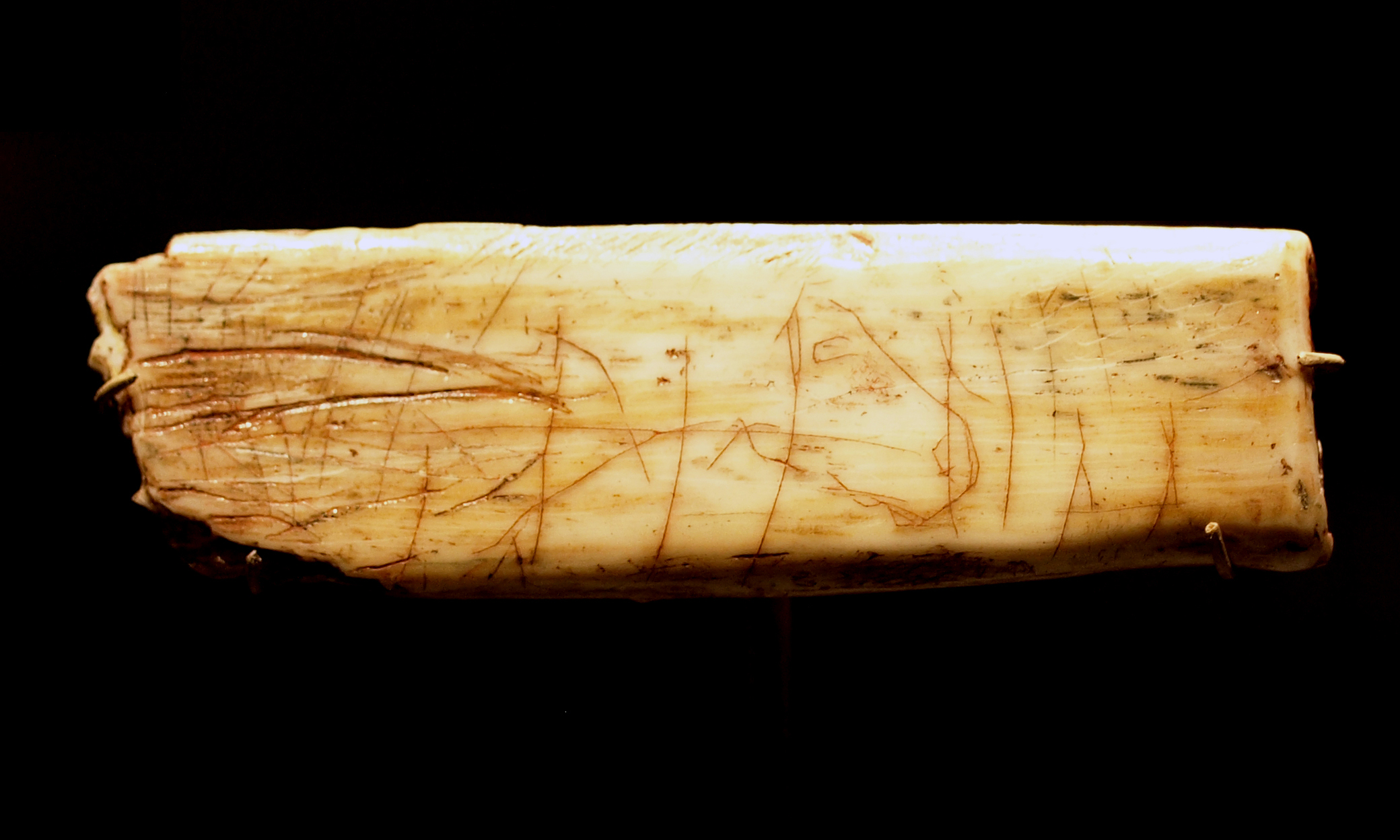
Robin Hood Cave Horse, from Creswell Crags, c. 10,500 BC

Creswell Crags on the Nottinghamshire-Derbyshire border, dating to around 15,700-12,800 years ago is one of the few localities with evidence of figurative Paleolithic art in Britain, including wall engravings of bison and deer, birds and human figures, as well bone engravings, such as the figure of a horse's head etched onto a rib fragment. Cathole Cave in South Wales may also have a wall engraving of a reindeer, suggested to date to at least 12,500 years ago.

Around 14-13,000 years ago, a new wave of hunter-gatherers arrived in Britain, associated with the Western Hunter-Gatherer genetic cluster distinct from those of earlier British Magdalenian peoples, as exemplified by an individual from Kendrick's Cave in North Wales, who appears to have had a diet heavy in freshwater or marine resources. There is no radiocarbon dated evidence of human occupation of Britain during the following cold Younger Dryas, approximately 12,900-11,700 years ago, which may indicate that Britain was abandoned by humans during this period.

=== Mesolithic ===
(c. 9,700 to 4,300 BC)

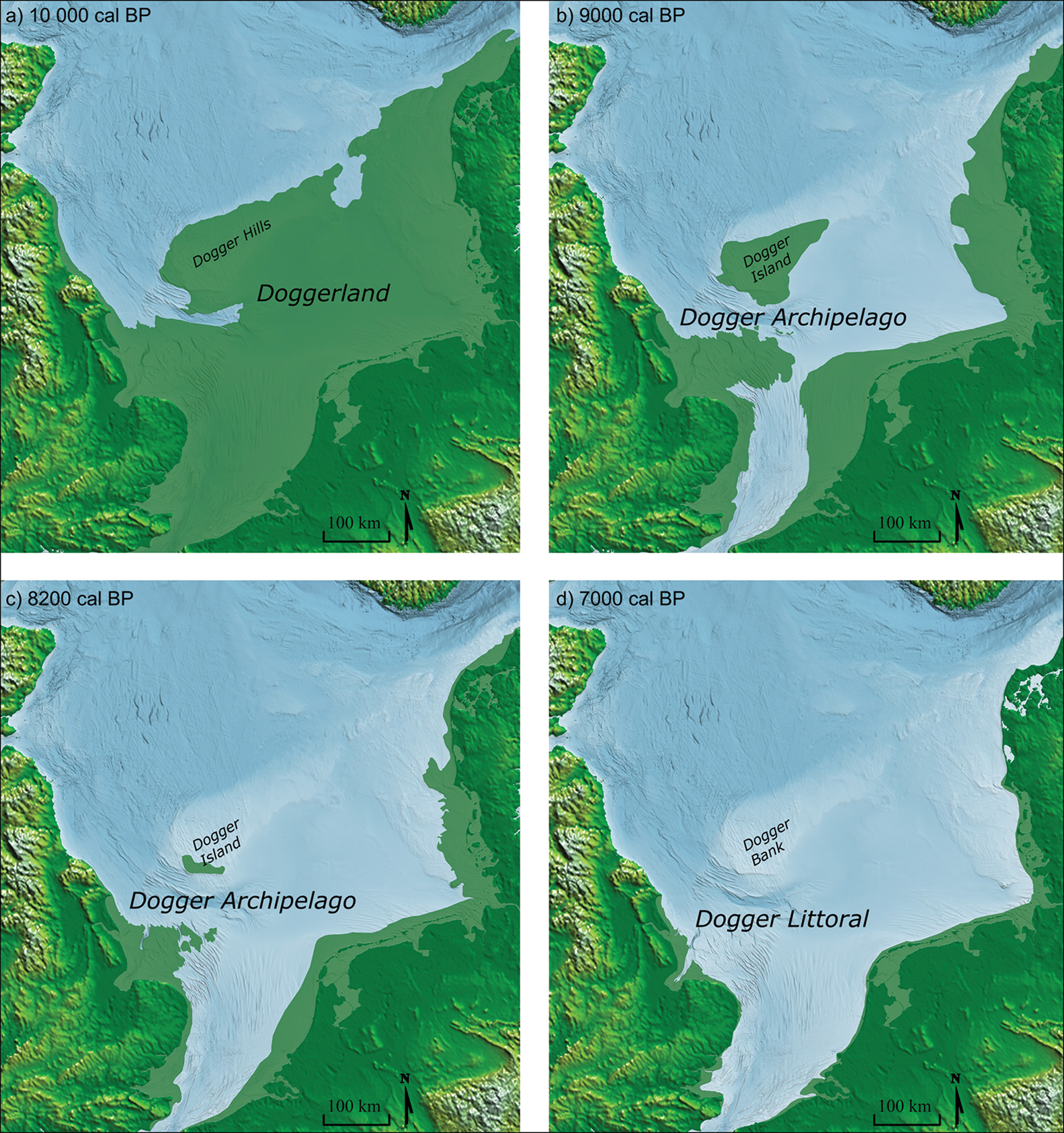
Map showing the progressive drowning of Doggerland from 10,000 years Before Present (BP, top left), to 7000 BP (bottom right)

The Younger Dryas was followed by the Holocene, which began around 9,700 BC (approximately 11,700 years Before Present), and continues to the present. By 8000 BC temperatures were higher than today, and birch woodlands spread rapidly, but there was a cold spell around 6,200 BC which lasted about 150 years. Doggerland would no longer have formed a continuous plain by around 7000 BC (9000 BP) and submergence was largely complete by 5000 BC (7000 BP). The warmer climate changed the arctic environment to one of pine, birch and alder forest; this less open landscape was less conducive to the large herds of reindeer and wild horse that had previously sustained humans. Those animals were replaced in people's diets by pig and less social animals such as elk, red deer, roe deer, wild boar and aurochs (wild cattle), which would have required different hunting techniques.

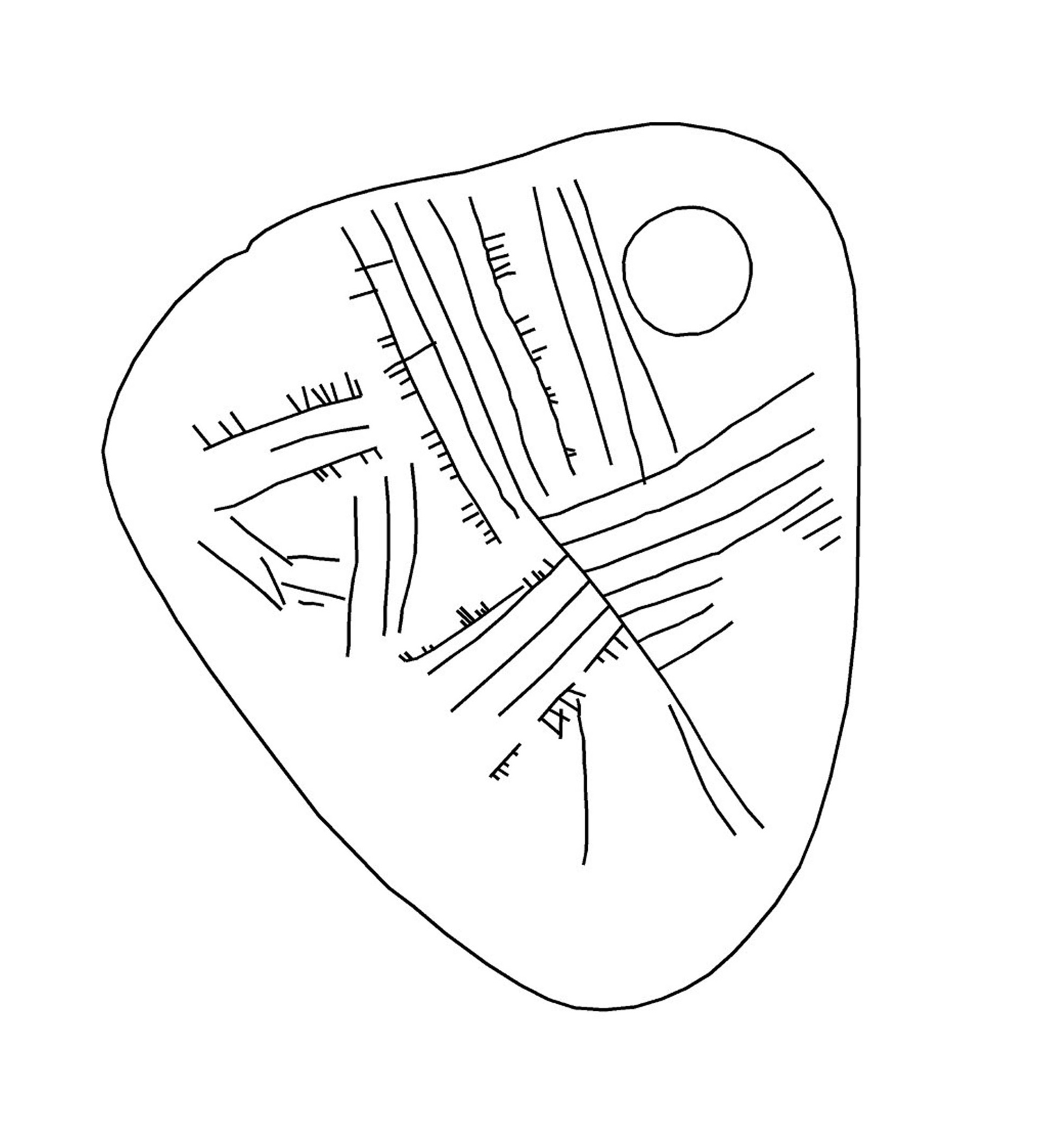
Star Carr Pendant, c. 9000 BC

The older view of Mesolithic Britain as monotonous and unchanging, with the endless repetition of seasonal rounds is now being replaced with a more complex picture. Different periods of Mesolithic occupation in Britain are distinguished by the use of differently shaped microlith (small lithic pieces used as spear tips and arrowheads) technology, though the chronology of a number of different British microlith industries is currently poorly resolved. During the earliest part of the Mesolithic, evidence of occupation of Britain is concentrated in the drainage basin of the Thames in Southern England, and in the northeast of England, including the important Star Carr site in North Yorkshire.

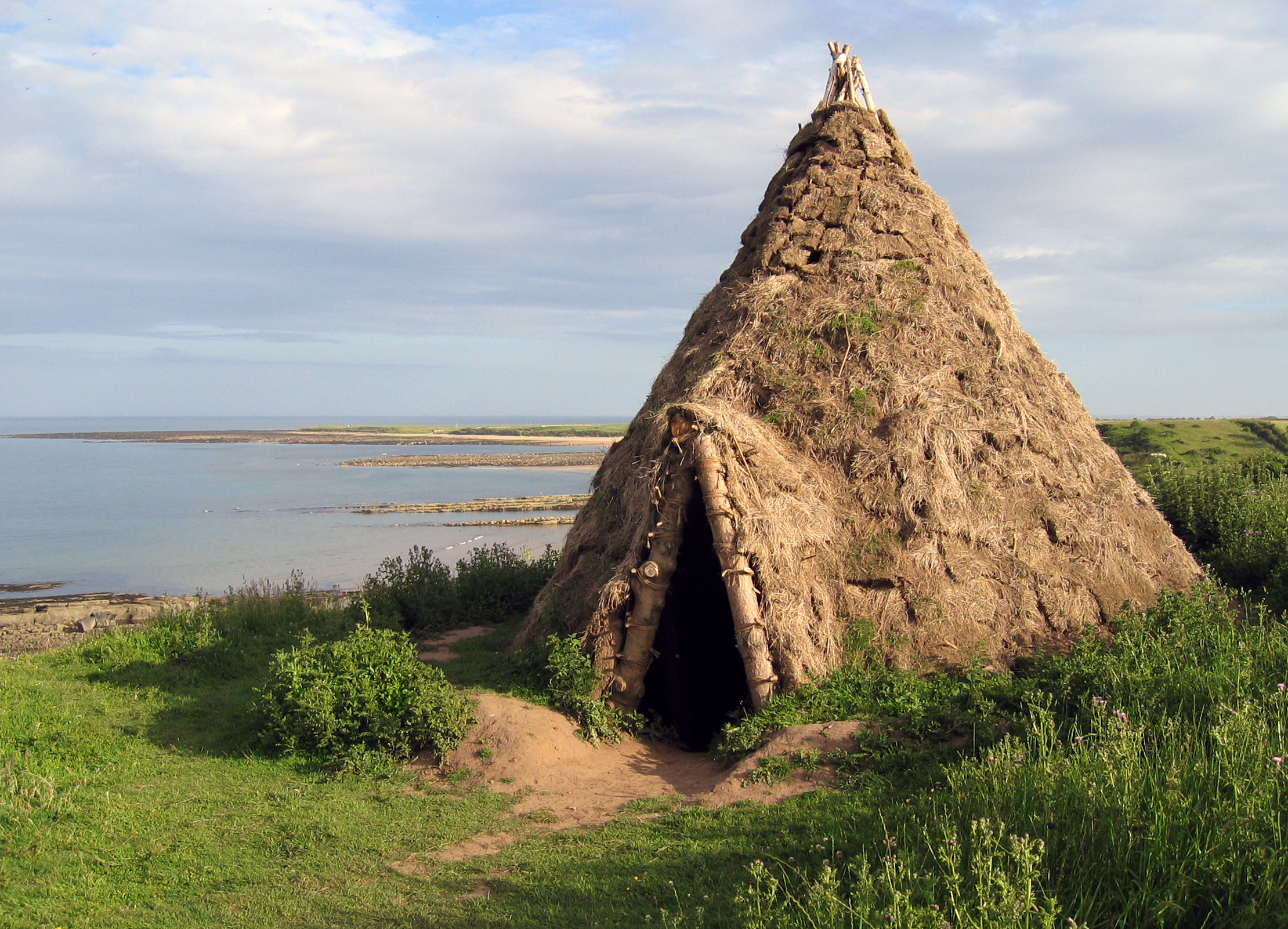
Howick house reconstruction, c. 7600 BC

At Star Carr, located on the former edge of a lake, and occupied c. 9300-8500 BC, organic remains have been found alongside stone tools, these include the remains of animals, including the antlered skulls of red deer stags that have been modified into headdresses, wooden structures, including raised platforms, as well as the Star Carr Pendant, an engraved slate pendant which represents the oldest Mesolithic art in Britain. The later Mesolithic shows an increased construction of structures such as houses, pits and hearths. Excavations at Howick in Northumberland uncovered evidence of the construction of huts dating to c. 7800 BC. Animal bones and in coastal areas, seashells were frequently dumped into middens. Hazelnuts were also widely exploited as a food source, with their charred remains often found at (particularly Middle) Mesolithic sites.

One of the most famous human Mesolithic skeletons is Cheddar Man, dating to c. 8300 BC who has a typical Western Hunter-Gatherer DNA profile (though with some minor Magdalenian-related ancestry) similar to those of Mesolithic hunter-gatherers across western-central Europe.

While the British Mesolithic is often considered insular and isolated from the events occurring in mainland Europe, towards the end of the Mesolithic, there may have been cultural interchange between people inhabiting Britain and mainland Europe.

=== Neolithic ===
(c. 4,300 to 2,000 BC)

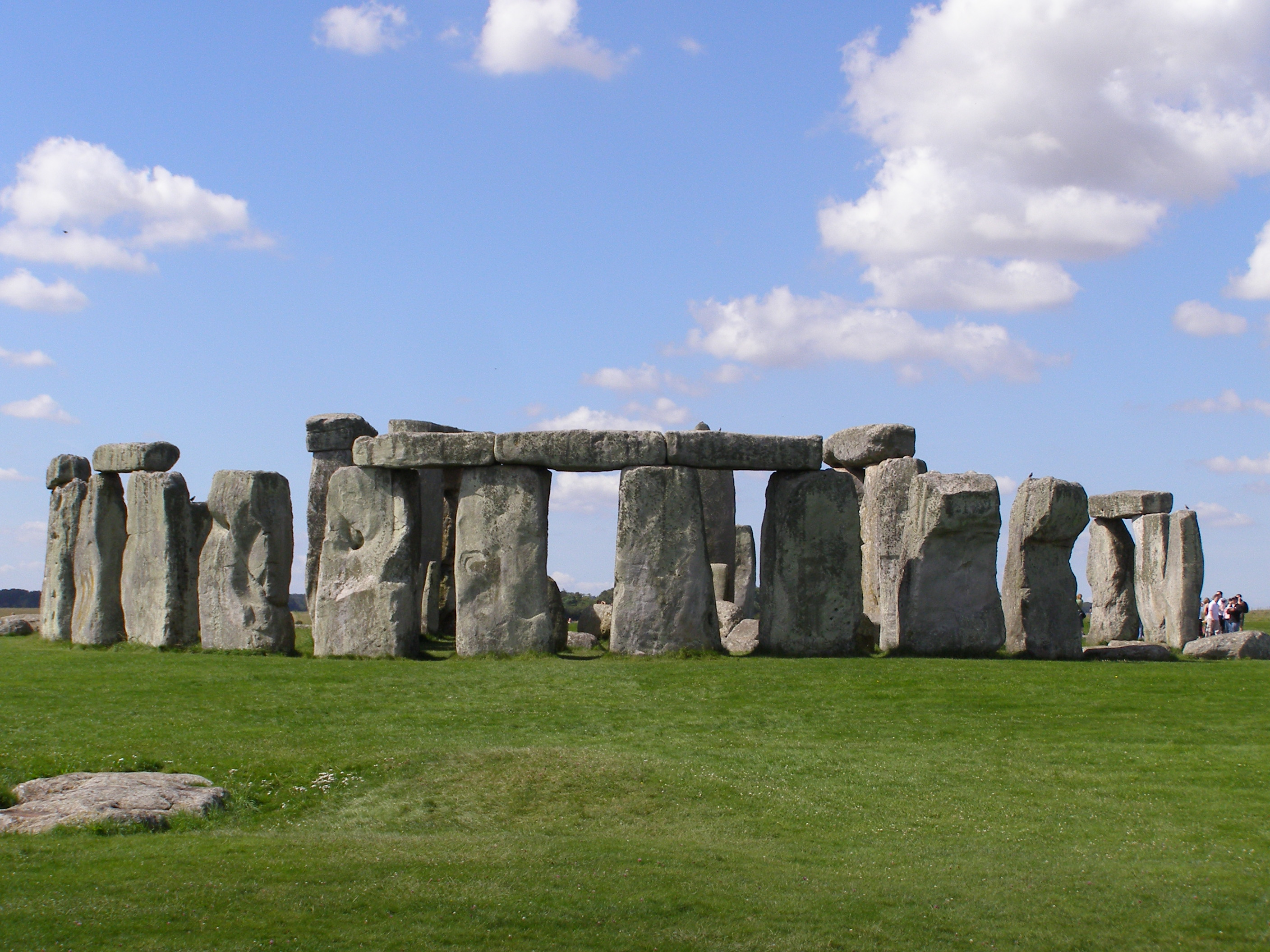
Stonehenge, c. 3000–2500 BC

DNA analysis of human remains spanning the Mesolithic-Neolithic transition shows that the transition to the Neolithic c. 4000 BC was brought by the migration of European Neolithic Farmers from the continent (with British Neolithic farmers being closely related to Neolithic farmers in the Iberian Peninsula), who had ultimately originated in Anatolia (the Asian part of modern Turkey) several thousand years earlier. The continental Neolithic farmers effectively appear to have replaced the previous Mesolithic hunter-gatherers, and there is little evidence of mixing of British Neolithic farmers and Mesolithic hunter-gatherers outside of Western Scotland, where some individuals appear to have had recent hunter-gatherer ancestry.

The construction of the earliest earthwork sites in Britain began during the early Neolithic (c. 4400–3300 BC) in the form of long barrows used for communal burial and the first causewayed enclosures, sites which have parallels on the continent. The former may be derived from the long house, although no long house villages have been found in Britain — only individual examples. The stone-built houses on Orkney — such as those at Skara Brae — are, however, indicators of some nucleated settlement in Britain. Evidence of growing mastery over the environment is embodied in the Sweet Track, a wooden trackway built to cross the marshes of the Somerset Levels and dated to 3807 BC. Leaf-shaped arrowheads, round-based pottery types and the beginnings of polished axe production are common indicators of the period. Evidence of the use of cow's milk comes from analysis of pottery contents found beside the Sweet Track. According to archaeological evidence from North Yorkshire, salt was being produced by evaporation of seawater around this time, enabling more effective preservation of meat.

The Middle Neolithic (c. 3300–2900 BC) saw the development of cursus monuments close to earlier barrows and the growth and abandonment of causewayed enclosures, as well as the building of impressive chamber tombs such as the Maeshowe types. The earliest stone circles and individual burials also appear.

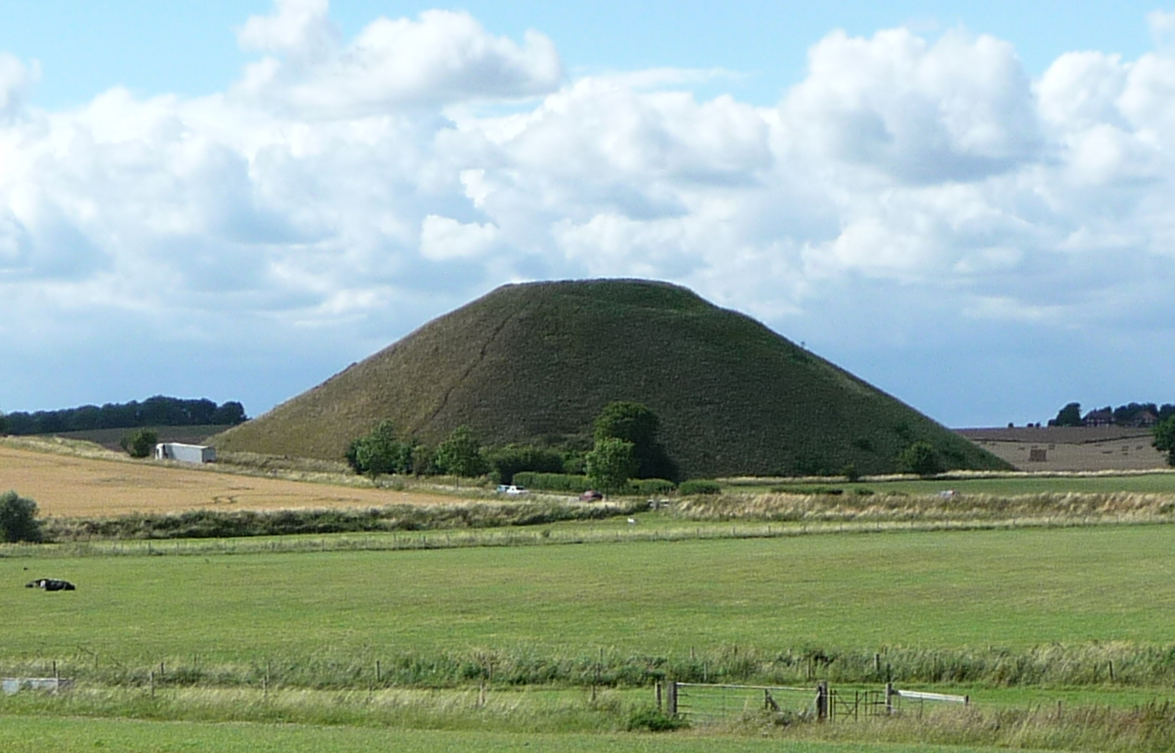
The Neolithic site of Silbury Hill in Wiltshire, southern England, c. 2400 BC. The Neolithic saw the construction of a wide variety of monuments in the landscape, many of which were megalithic in nature.

Different pottery types, such as grooved ware, appear during the later Neolithic (c. 2900–2200 BC). In addition, new enclosures called henges were built, along with stone rows and the famous sites of Stonehenge, Avebury and Silbury Hill, which building reached its peak at this time. Industrial flint mining begins, such as that at Cissbury and Grimes Graves, along with evidence of long-distance trade. Wooden tools and bowls were common, and bows were also constructed.

== Bronze Age ==
(Around 2200 to 750 BC)

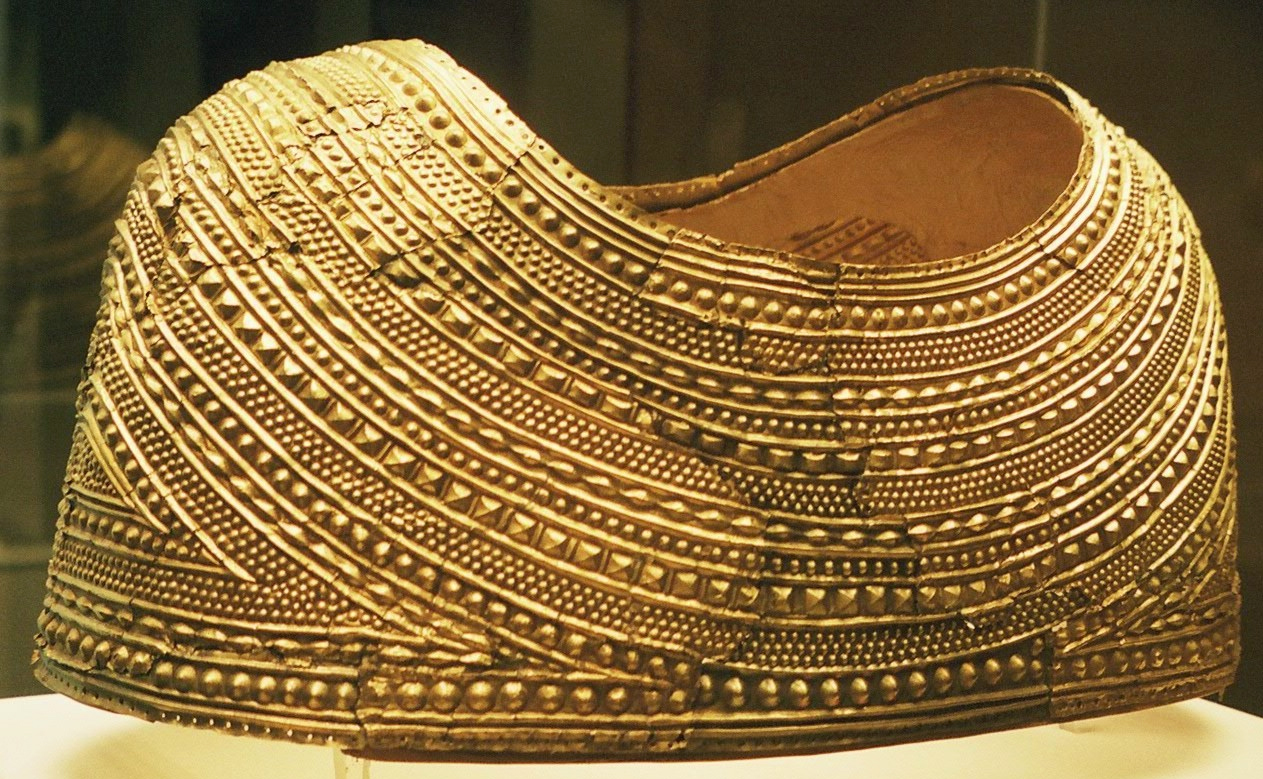
Gold cape from Mold, Wales, c. 1900 BC

This period can be sub-divided into an earlier phase (2300–1200 BC) and a later one (1200–700 BC). Bell Beaker culture pottery appears in England around 2475–2315 cal. BC along with flat axes and burial practices of inhumation. With the revised Stonehenge chronology, this is after the Sarsen Circle and trilithons were erected at Stonehenge. Several regions of origin have been postulated for the Beaker culture, notably the Iberian peninsula, the Netherlands and Central Europe. The arrival of the Bell Beaker culture in Britain appears to be associated with another major episode of migration from mainland Europe, associated with people with high levels of Eastern European steppe-associated ancestry that originated in the Yamnaya culture of eastern Ukraine and southern Russia, effectively replacing the earlier Neolithic inhabitants of Britain (with 90% of the gene pool of Bronze Age Britons coming from continental Bell-Beaker migrants).

Beaker techniques brought to Britain the skill of refining metal. At first the users made items from copper, but from around 2150 BC smiths had discovered how to smelt bronze (which is much harder than copper) by mixing copper with a small amount of tin. With this discovery, the Bronze Age arrived in Britain. Over the next thousand years, bronze gradually replaced stone as the main material for tool and weapon making.

Britain had large, easily accessible reserves of tin in the modern areas of Cornwall and Devon and thus tin mining began. By around 1600 BC the southwest of Britain was experiencing a trade boom as British tin was exported across Europe, evidence of ports being found in Southern Devon at Bantham and Mount Batten. Copper was mined at the Great Orme in North Wales.

The Beaker people were also skilled at making ornaments from gold, silver and copper, and examples of these have been found in graves of the wealthy Wessex culture of central southern Britain.

Early Bronze Age Britons buried their dead beneath earth mounds known as barrows, often with a beaker alongside the body. Later in the period, cremation was adopted as a burial practice with cemeteries of urns containing cremated individuals appearing in the archaeological record, with deposition of metal objects such as daggers. People of this period were also largely responsible for building many famous prehistoric sites such as the later phases of Stonehenge along with Seahenge. The Bronze Age people lived in round houses and divided up the landscape. Stone rows are to be seen on, for example, Dartmoor. They ate cattle, sheep, pigs and deer as well as shellfish and birds. They carried out salt manufacture. The wetlands were a source of wildfowl and reeds. There was ritual deposition of offerings in the wetlands and in holes in the ground.

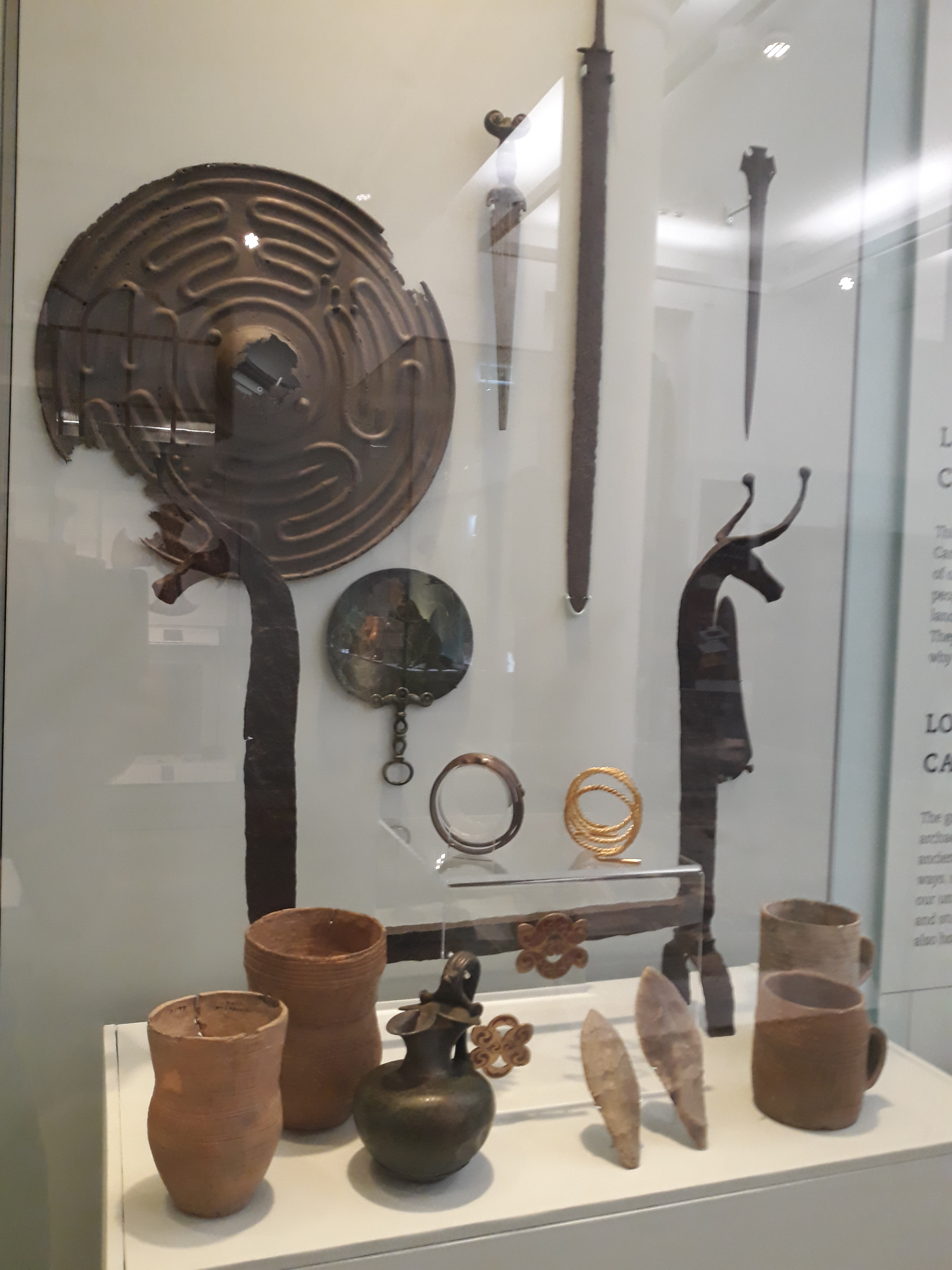
Bronze Age and Iron Age artefacts from East Anglia

There is evidence of a relatively large scale disruption of cultural patterns (see Late Bronze Age collapse) which some scholars think may indicate an invasion (or at least a migration) into Southern Great Britain c. the 12th century BC. This disruption was felt far beyond Britain, even beyond Europe, as most of the great Near Eastern empires collapsed (or experienced severe difficulties) and the Sea Peoples harried the entire Mediterranean basin around this time. Some scholars consider that the Celtic languages arrived in Britain at this time, but other elements of the Celtic cultural package derive from the Hallstatt culture.

In an archaeogenetics study, Patterson et al. (2021) uncovered a migration into southern Britain during the 500-year period 1,300–800 BC. The newcomers were genetically most similar to ancient individuals from Gaul, and had higher levels of EEF ancestry. During 1,000–875 BC, their genetic marker swiftly spread through southern Britain, making up around half the ancestry of subsequent Iron Age people in this area, but not in northern Britain. The "evidence suggests that, rather than a violent invasion or a single migratory event, the genetic structure of the population changed through sustained contacts between Britain and mainland Europe over several centuries, such as the movement of traders, intermarriage, and small scale movements of family groups". The authors describe this as a "plausible vector for the spread of early Celtic languages into Britain". There was much less migration into Britain during the Iron Age, so it is likely that Celtic reached Britain before then. The study also found that lactose tolerance rose swiftly in early Iron Age Britain, a thousand years before it became widespread in mainland Europe; suggesting milk became a very important foodstuff in Britain at this time.

== Iron Age ==
(around 750 BC – 43 AD)

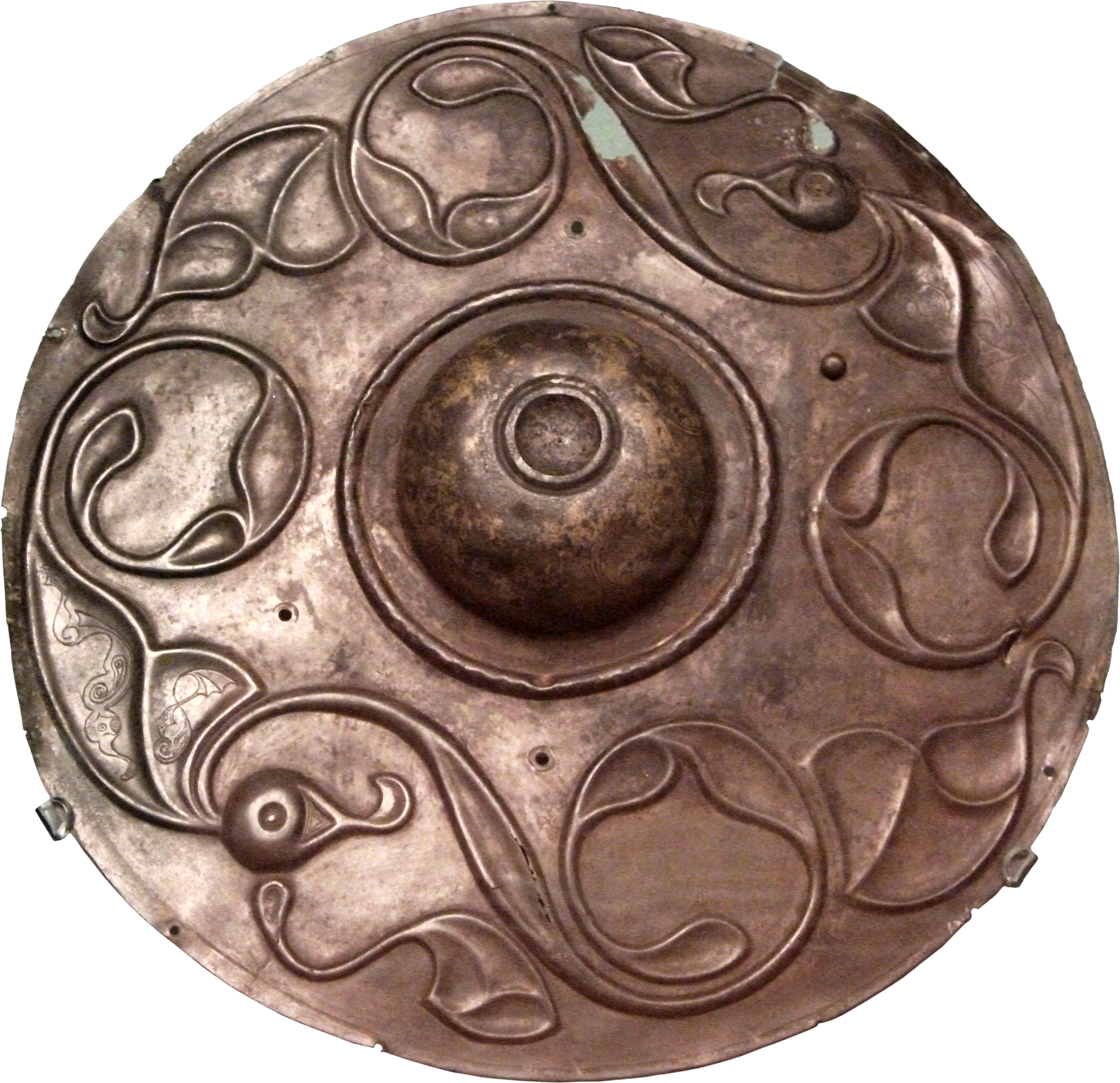
Wandsworth Shield, in the Insular version of La Tène style, 2nd century BC

In around 750 BC iron working techniques reached Britain from southern Europe. Iron was stronger and more plentiful than bronze, and its introduction marks the beginning of the Iron Age. Iron working revolutionised many aspects of life, most importantly agriculture. Iron tipped ploughs could turn soil more quickly and deeply than older wooden or bronze ones, and iron axes could clear forest land more efficiently for agriculture. There was a landscape of arable, pasture and managed woodland. There were many enclosed settlements and land ownership was important.

It is generally thought that by 500 BC most people inhabiting the British Isles were speaking Common Brythonic, on the limited evidence of place-names recorded by Pytheas of Massalia and transmitted to us second-hand, largely through Strabo. Certainly by the Roman period there is substantial place and personal name evidence which suggests that this was so; Tacitus also states in his Agricola that the British language differed little from that of the Gauls. Among these people were skilled craftsmen who had begun producing intricately patterned gold jewellery, in addition to tools and weapons of both bronze and iron. It is disputed whether Iron Age Britons were "Celts", with some academics such as John Collis and Simon James actively opposing the idea of 'Celtic Britain', since the term was only applied at this time to a tribe in Gaul. However, place names and tribal names from the later part of the period suggest that a Celtic language was spoken.

The traveller Pytheas, whose own works are lost, was quoted by later classical authors as calling the people "Pretanoi", which is cognate with "Britanni" and is apparently Celtic in origin. The term "Celtic" continues to be used by linguists to describe the family that includes many of the ancient languages of Western Europe and modern British languages such as Welsh without controversy. The dispute essentially revolves around how the word "Celtic" is defined; it is clear from the archaeological and historical record that Iron Age Britain did have much in common with Iron Age Gaul, but there were also many differences. Many leading academics, such as Barry Cunliffe, still use the term to refer to the pre-Roman inhabitants of Britain for want of a better label.

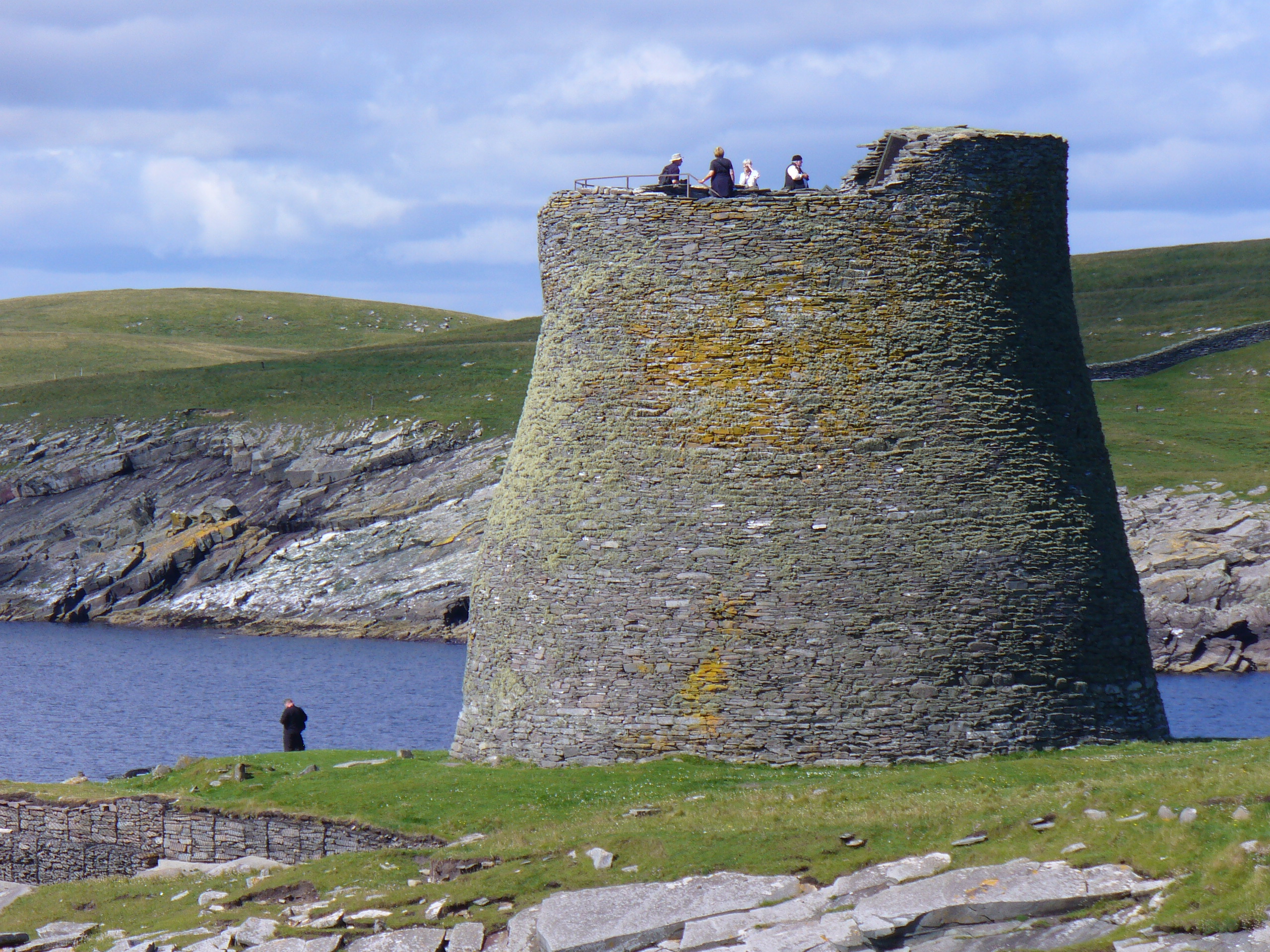
Broch of Mousa, Scotland, c. 100 BC

Iron Age Britons lived in organised tribal groups, ruled by a chieftain. As people became more numerous, wars broke out between opposing tribes. This was traditionally interpreted as the reason for the building of hill forts, although the siting of some earthworks on the sides of hills undermined their defensive value, hence "hill forts" may represent increasing communal areas or even 'elite areas'. However some hillside constructions may simply have been cow enclosures. Although the first had been built about 1500 BC, hillfort building peaked during the later Iron Age. There are around 3,300 structures that can be classed as hillforts or similar "defended enclosures" within Britain. By about 350 BC many hillforts went out of use and the remaining ones were reinforced. Pytheas was quoted as writing that the Britons were renowned wheat farmers. Large farmsteads produced food in industrial quantities and Roman sources note that Britain exported hunting dogs, animal skins and slaves.

=== Late pre-Roman Iron Age ===
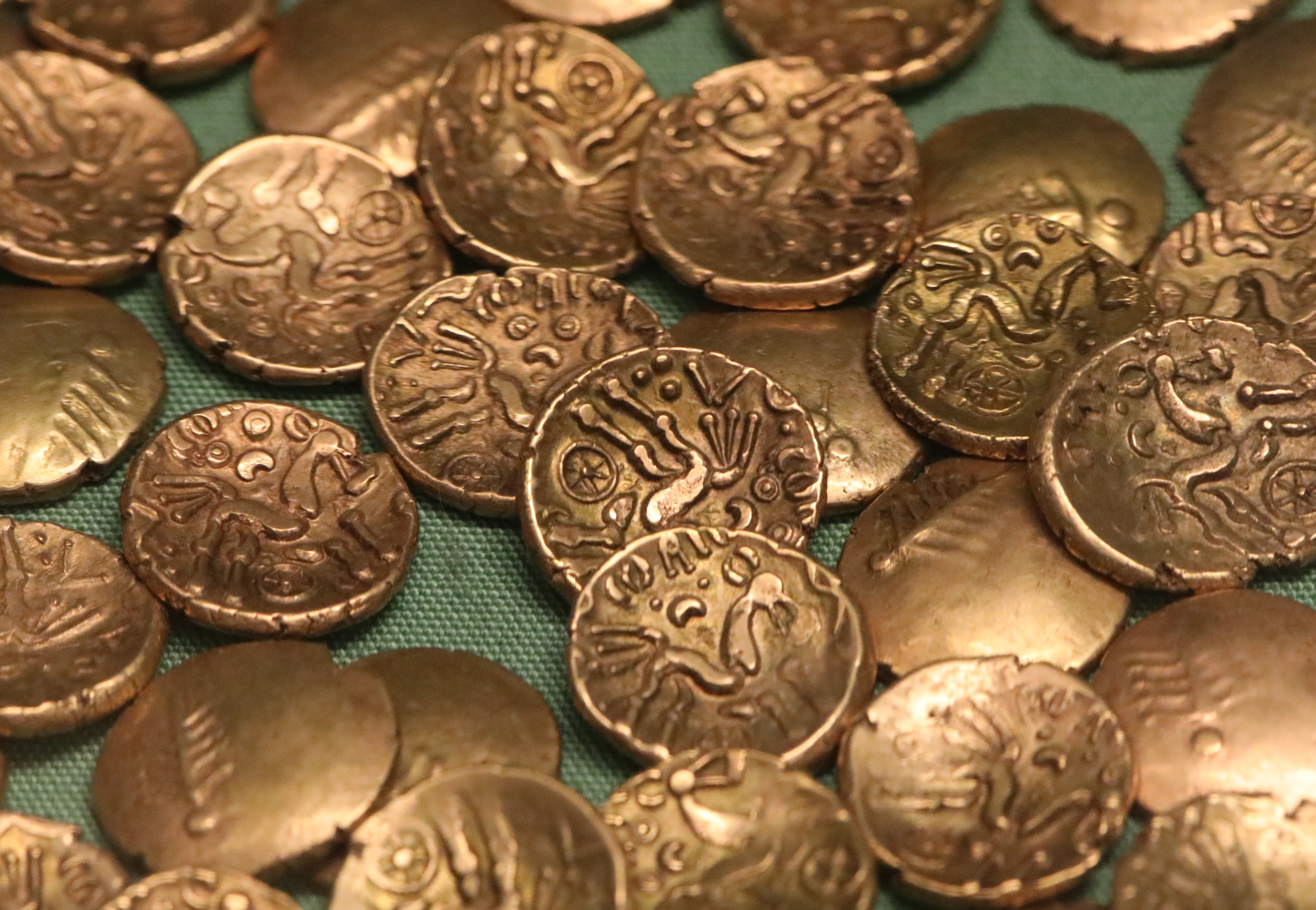
Gold Celtic coins from the Farmborough Hoard

The last centuries before the Roman invasion saw an influx of Celtic-speaking refugees from Gaul (approximately modern day France and Belgium) known as the Belgae, who were displaced as the Roman Empire expanded around 50 BC. They settled along most of the coastline of southern Britain between about 200 BC and AD 43, although it is hard to estimate what proportion of the population there they formed. A Gaulish tribe known as the Parisi, who had cultural links to the continent, appeared in northeast England.

From around 175 BC, the areas of Kent, Hertfordshire and Essex developed especially advanced pottery-making skills. The tribes of southeast England became partially Romanised and were responsible for creating the first settlements (oppida) large enough to be called towns.

The last centuries before the Roman invasion saw increasing sophistication in British life. About 100 BC, iron bars began to be used as currency, while internal trade and trade with continental Europe flourished, largely due to Britain's extensive mineral reserves. Coinage was developed, based on continental types but bearing the names of local chieftains. This was used in southeast England, but not in areas such as Dumnonia in the west.

As the Roman Empire expanded northwards, Rome began to take interest in Britain. This may have been caused by an influx of refugees from Roman occupied Europe, or Britain's large mineral reserves. See Roman Britain for the history of this subsequent period.

== Protohistory ==
The first significant written record of Britain and its inhabitants was made by the Greek navigator Pytheas, who explored the coastal region of Britain around 325 BC. However, there may be some additional information on Britain in the Ora Maritima, a text which is now lost but which is incorporated in the writing of the later author Avienius. Julius Caesar also wrote of Britain in about 50 BC after his two military expeditions to the island in 55 and 54 BC. The failed invasion during 54 BC is thought to be an attempt to conquer at least the southeast of Britain.

After some further false starts, the Roman conquest of Britain in 43 AD led to most of the island falling under Roman rule, and began the period of Roman Britain.

== See also ==
- Prehistoric Europe
- Prehistoric Scotland
- Prehistoric Wales
- Prehistoric Cornwall
- Boxgrove
- Gough's Cave
- Genetic history of the British Isles
- Happisburgh footprints
- Kents Cavern
- List of prehistoric structures in Great Britain
- Pakefield
- Paviland
- Pontnewydd
- Swanscombe
- Arras Culture
- Wetwang Slack
- Danes Graves
- Arthur's Stone, Herefordshire

== Sources ==
- Ball, Martin J. & James Fife (ed.). 1993. The Celtic Languages. London: Routledge. ISBN 0-415-01035-7.
- British History Encyclopedia. 1999. Paragon House. ISBN 1-4054-1632-7.
- Collis, John. 2003. The Celts – Origins, Myths and Inventions. Tempus.
- Cunliffe, Barry (2012). Britain Begins. Oxford University Press. ISBN 978-0-19-967945-4.
- James, Simon. 1999. The Atlantic Celts. British Museum Press.
- Lemercier, O. (2012). "Interpreting the Beaker phenomenon in Mediterranean France: an Iron Age analogy". Antiquity. 86 (331): 131–43. doi:10.1017/S0003598X00062505. S2CID 19294850.
- Pearson, Mike; et al. (2007). "The Age of Stonehenge" (PDF). Antiquity. 811 (313): 617–639. doi:10.1017/S0003598X00095624. S2CID 162960418.
- Pettitt, Paul; White, Mark (2012). The British Palaeolithic: Human Societies at the Edge of the Pleistocene World. Abingdon, UK: Routledge. ISBN 978-0-415-67455-3.
