= Ayton East Field Hoard =

Neolithic hoard from North Yorkshire, England

The Ayton East Field Hoard is a hoard of Neolithic stone and antler tools from East Ayton, North Yorkshire, England.

== Discovery ==
The hoard was excavated from a cairn in 1849 by A. D. Conyngham. The barrow itself measured 160 feet (49 m) by 100 feet (30 m). A primary burial in the centre of the cairn included human remains and some stone tools. The hoard was associated with a secondary burial of a small amount of human remains in the barrow. The cairn has been radiocarbon dated to 3080 ±90 BC.

== Contents ==
The hoard contains three flint axes and a flint adze, five arrowheads, a polished flint knife, two flint flakes, an antler 'macehead' and two boar-tusk knives.

== Acquisition ==
The hoard was acquired by the British Museum in 1879 from a donation by Rev William Greenwell.
