= William Greenwell =

English archaeologist (1820–1918)

The Reverend Canon William Greenwell JP FRS FSA FSA Scot
- Born: 23 March 1820
- Died: 27 January 1918 (aged 97)
- Known for: Archaeologist

Academic work
- Discipline: Archaeology
- Sub-discipline: Prehistoric Britain; Roman Britain; numismatics
- Institutions: University College, Durham; Hatfield Hall, Durham; Bishop Cosin's Hall, Durham; Durham Cathedral Library

Ecclesiastical career
- Religion: Christianity
- Church: Church of England
- Ordained: 1844 (deacon); 1846 (priest)
- Congregations: Durham Cathedral; Church of St Mary the Less, Durham
- Offices held: minor canon of Durham Cathedral (1854–1908)

William Greenwell, JP, FRS, FSA, FSA Scot (23 March 1820 – 27 January 1918) was an English archaeologist and Church of England priest.

== Early life ==
William Greenwell was born 23 March 1820 at the estate known as Greenwell Ford near Lanchester, County Durham, England. He was the eldest son of William Thomas Greenwell (1777–1856) and Dorothy Smales. He had three brothers Francis, Alan (vicar of Haydock), and Henry, and a sister Dorothy (1821–1882) who published poetry under the name Dora Greenwell.

After an early education by Rev George Newby, he attended Witton-le-Wear Preparatory School, then Durham School where one of his schoolmates was Henry Baker Tristram. He matriculated at University College, Durham in October 1836 and graduated Bachelor of Arts (BA) in June 1839. He started training to be a barrister at Middle Temple, but owing to ill health decided to leave London and return to University College in 1841, completing a licentiate in Theology in 1842. He received a Master of Arts in 1843. Greenwell was ordained a deacon by Bishop Edward Maltby 30 June 1844 and priest 28 June 1846. He was bursar of University College in Durham from 1844 to 1847.

== Archaeology ==
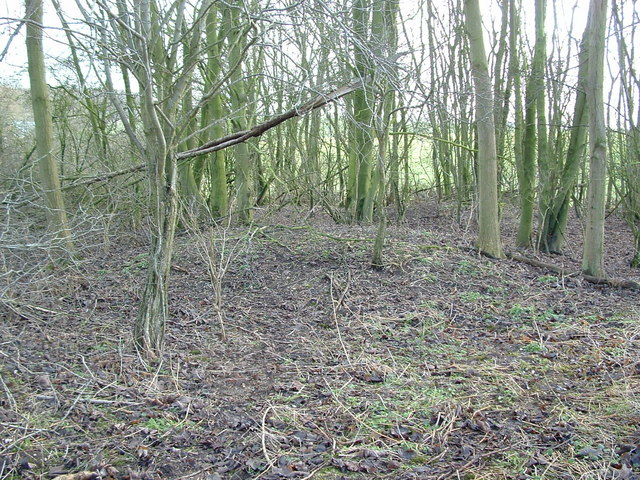
A shallow barrow at Danes Graves.

Plan of old shaft and galleries at Grimes Graves

His family estate included the site of the ancient Roman fort Longovicium. As a child he and his brother Frank would scoop out soil covering the camp, leading to his interest in archaeology. He was a founding member of the Tyneside Naturalists' Field Club in 1846, and later that year toured Germany and Italy. In August 1852 he presented a paper at an Archaeological Institute there. In March 1864, he excavated fourteen barrows at Danes Graves a site of the Arras Culture of the British Iron Age and was subsequently criticised by William Harrison-Broadley for his poor excavation technique. In 1868, Greenwell excavated 76 inhumation burials from the Anglian cemetery at Uncleby. Greenwell undertook a large-scale excavation of 53 barrows at Danes Graves with John Robert Mortimer between 1897–98. Greenwell is also noted for his work on the Grimes Graves along with his treatises on electrum coinage of Cyzicus, and cataloguing of the Late Bronze Age finds from Heathery Burn Cave.

One of his students was Augustus Pitt Rivers, who received his first instruction in excavation from Greenwell at a site in the Yorkshire Wolds. Greenwell's view of archaeology as a serious scholarly process of assembling evidence on periods which lacked written records, contrasted to what he called the "ignorant and greedy spirit of mere curiosity-hunting", would influence Pitt Rivers' own approach.

Greenwell's enormous collection of antiquities, many of which date from the Neolithic or Bronze Age period in Britain, is now in the British Museum. This was thanks to the generosity of J. P. Morgan, who bought them for £10,000. In 1895, he sold his collections of flint implements to Dr W. Allan Sturge, formerly of Nice. His earliest collection of note was Greek coins, which he eventually sold to a Mr. Warren of Boston, Massachusetts, with Warren later donating it to the Boston Museum. His collection of carved stones is in the museum of Durham Cathedral, and is described by them as "one of the most complete and comprehensive collections of early medieval stone sculpture in the country".

With the money made from selling his collections he was able to repurchase his ancestral home, Greenwell Ford, which he left to his nephew, judge Sir Francis John Greenwell.

== Career ==
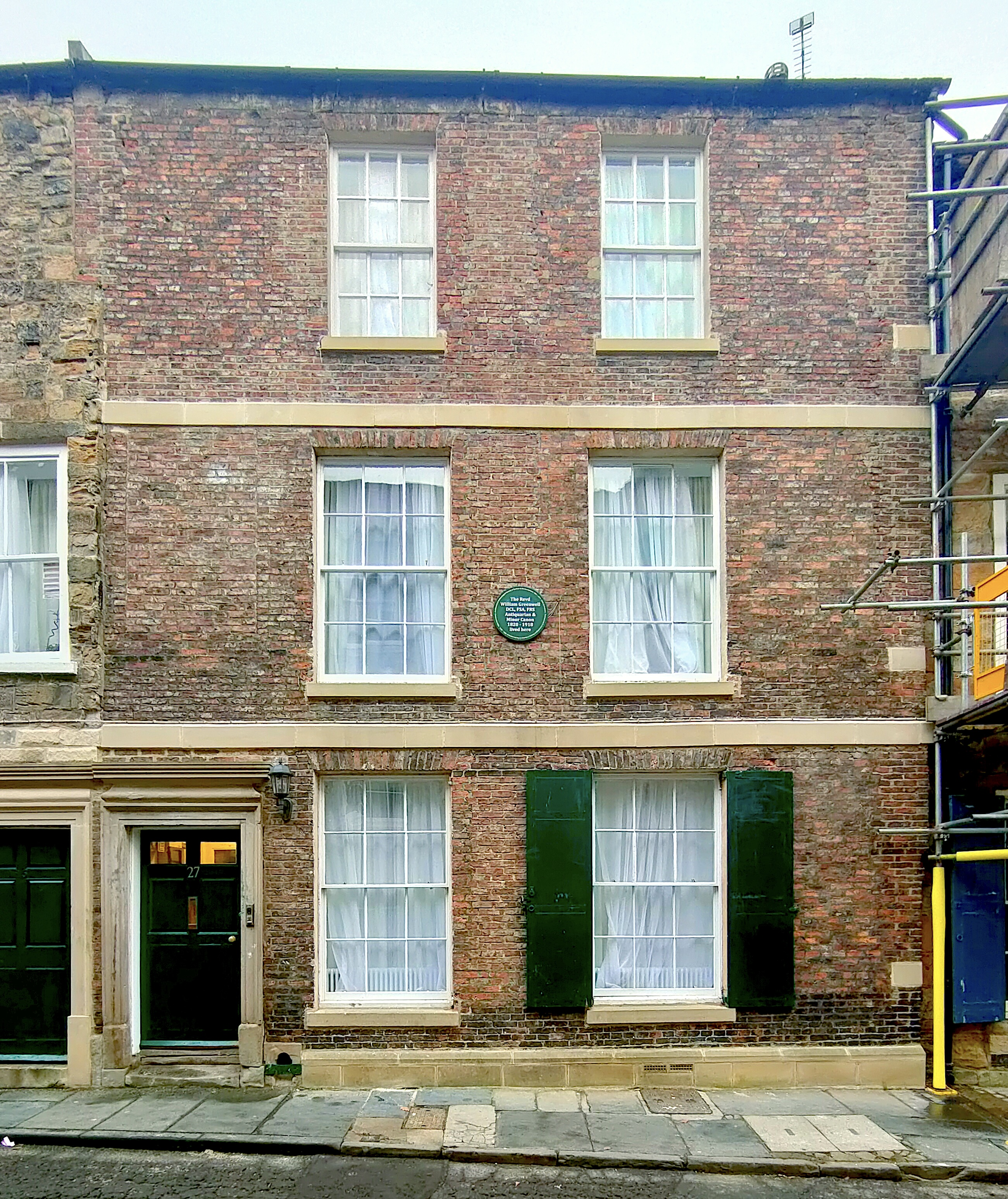
Greenwell's house at 27, North Bailey, Durham, now part of St Cuthbert's Society

Greenwell held the perpetual curacy of Ovingham with Mickley from 1847 to 1850. He then briefly served Robert Isaac Wilberforce as curate at Burton Agnes, Yorkshire, before becoming assistant to William George Henderson, principal of Hatfield Hall, Durham. In 1852 he was appointed principal of Neville Hall, a hostel for students at Newcastle College of Medicine, with whom he worked among the town's cholera victims in 1853.

Greenwell was appointed canon at Durham Cathedral from 1854 to his death, and became known as Canon Greenwell. He was also chaplain and censor at Bishop Cosin's Hall from 1855-1863. From 1863 to 1908, Greenwell was librarian of Durham Cathedral, where he continued the work of cataloguing the holdings begun by Joseph Stevenson. Greenwell was president of the Architectural and Archaeological Society of Durham from 1865 to his death, and vice-president of the Society of Antiquaries of Newcastle from 1890 until his death. In 1868, he was elected to the Society of Antiquaries of London. He was appointed a Justice of the Peace in 1870, later chairing the Durham ward petty sessions, and was elected an alderman in 1904.

He was awarded the Medal of the Royal Numismatic Society in 1898. He died, unmarried, at North Bailey, Durham, on 27 January 1918, and was buried at Lanchester.

== Personal ==
Known in Durham as 'The Canon', he had a reputation for being bluff and plain-spoken. Greenwell was a Liberal in politics, and in religion a Tractarian who in later life retreated to more conservative high-churchmanship. His fishing and hunting skills developed in early childhood on the River Browney and he remained a keen angler to his ninety-eighth year. As an outdoorsman keen on angling and shooting, his sporting instincts made him naturally sympathetic to poachers. When a poacher was brought for trial in Durham both the police and the defendant, with differing motives, would inquire whether Greenwell would be on the bench. He is known as originator of "Greenwell's Glory", used in fly fishing.

In 2022, Kit Cawthorn, at Durham University, founded The William Greenwell Fly Fishing Society, named after The Canon. It is a "thriving, inclusive society".

== Works ==
- William Greenwell (2006) [1852]. Boldon Buke: a Survey of the Possessions of the See of Durham Made by order of Bishop Hugh Pudsey, in the Year MCLXXXIII. Adamant Media Corporation. ISBN 978-0-543-97277-4. With a translation, an appendix of original documents, and a glossary.
- William Greenwell (1853). The Pontifical of Egbert, Archbishop of York (731-67). Surtees Society.
- William Greenwell (1853). Bishop Hatfield's survey: a record of the possessions of the see of Durham. Surtees Society.
- William Greenwell (1860). Wills and inventories from the Durham registry Part II. Surtees Society.
- William Greenwell (1872). Feodarium Prioratus Dunelmensis, a survey of the Estates of the Convent of Durham in the Fifteenth Century. Surtees Society.
- William Greenwell (1877). British barrows, a record of the examination of sepulchral mounds in various parts of England. the Clarendon press. Together with description of figures of skulls, general remarks on prehistoric crania, and an appendix by George Rolleston.
- William Greenwell (1893). "Rare Greek coins". Numismatic Chronicle, Volume XIII Third Series, Pages 81–92.
- William Greenwell (1897). Durham Cathedral: an address delivered September 24, 1879 (Fifth ed.). Andrews.
- Francis Haverfield; William Greenwell (1899). A catalogue of the sculptured and inscribed stones in the Cathedral Library, Durham. Thomas Caldcleugh for Durham Cathedral Library.

== See also ==
- List of archaeologists
- British Iron Age
- British Neolithic
- Grimes Graves
- Arras culture
- Danes Graves
- East Ayton Hoard
- Durham Cathedral
