= Burton Fleming (archaeological site) =

Archaeological site in United Kingdom

- Map showing the location of Burton Fleming within East Riding of Yorkshire.
- 54.132641°N 0.34380999°W
- Type: Iron Age Cemetery
- Cultures: Arras Culture
- Location: Burton Fleming, East Riding of Yorkshire
- Region: Yorkshire

History
- Built: 500BC

Site notes
- Public access: Beneath arable fields.

Burton Fleming is an Iron Age archaeological site from the Arras culture of East Yorkshire. The site is named from the parish of Burton Fleming within which the Iron Age cemetery lies, and is closely associated with the Iron Age barrows at Rudston (the nearest parish).

The archaeological remains consist of 22 burials on the Argam Lane site and 42 at the Bell Slack site.

== Argam Lane ==
In 1972, 22 square-barrows were excavated. All had central graves into which the human remains were placed and lacked secondary burials either in the barrow or the associated ditches. Nineteen graves were arranged in two rows, with the remaining three to one side.

The skeletal remains were all found crouched or contracted, with the majority aligned on a north-south axis. Grave goods were variable, but where they appeared consisted of ceramic vessels, copper-alloy or iron brooches, or sheep bones. A single shale bracelet was found on the forearm of one female skeleton.

== Bell Slack ==
Excavation of a droveway in 1977 associated with a Romano-British settlement crossed two groups of square-barrows, some 400 metres apart. The 42 burials were excavated in 1978, but were already partly disturbed by later Romano-British ditches and landscape features.

Most skeletal remains were found crouched or contracted, but several were extended. Grave goods were variable, but where they appeared consisted of ceramic vessels, copper-alloy or iron brooches, pig or sheep bones. One male skeleton was found with an iron knife and iron spearhead. One grave contained two skeletons, one adult female and an adolescent of indeterminate age, and a variety of copper-alloy dress accessories including beads, a brooch and a shale ring.

== See also ==
- Danes Graves
- British Iron Age
- Wetwang Slack
- Chariot burial
- Burton Fleming
