= Wetwang Slack =

Iron Age burial site in Yorkshire, England

- Map showing the location of Wetwang Slack in the East Riding of Yorkshire.
- 54.0198°N 0.5745°W
- Type: Iron Age Cemetery
- Cultures: Arras Culture
- Location: near Wetwang, East Riding of Yorkshire
- Region: Yorkshire

Wetwang Slack is an Iron Age archaeological site containing remains of the Arras culture and chariot burial tradition of East Yorkshire. Archaeological investigation took place in 2001 and 2002.

The site is in a dry valley on the north side of the village of Wetwang. The archaeological remains consist of three chariot burial inhumations, each containing skeletal remains above the remains of a dismantled cart or chariot. All the skeletal remains from the three inhumations were aligned on a north–south axis, with the head pointing north. Many of the finds excavated from the site are now preserved in the British Museum.

== Burial 1 ==
The grave lay within a triangular ditched enclosure c 6.5–7 m wide, but the northern and eastern ditches have been removed by machine. The remains were of a young male adult lying on his right side with his knees drawn up to his body. Pig bones had been placed on top of the body. The iron tyres and nave hoops of both wheels survived, as did several spokes from the wheel. The axle of the chariot was 1.81 metres (5 ft 11 in) in length.

== Burial 2 ==
The second burial was contained within a square-ditched enclosure, or square barrow 9.6m wide. The skeletal remains were in the centre of the barrow and were of a young adult female, facing right with her legs bent and her arms extended. Pig bones were also deposited on top of the skeleton. A soilmark shows the position of the complete dismantled chariot, beneath the individual, including its extended pole to which the yoke would have attached. Other chariot fittings include iron tyres and bronze nave hoops, four spokes and terret rings. Behind the head and shoulders of the skeleton, were two horse-bits, a bronze case with a chain attached (diameter about 90mm), a pin and a bronze mirror.

This person has been named Wetwang Woman. English Heritage's chief archaeologist described this as "one of the most significant and exciting Middle Iron Age burials ever found in Britain".

== Burial 3 ==
Quarrying on the site has removed the northern edge of the enclosure, and the upper part of the cranial remains. As in the other burials, the body was placed on top of a dismantled chariot and was of a young adult, facing right with the thighs drawn up at right angles to the torso. Iron tyres and nave hoops survive along with other chariot fittings. The axle measured 1.83m in length. An iron sword, in its scabbard, with bronze decoration lay diagonally across the body and two rings with central studs of coral may have fitted onto the sword belt. Coral was also used in several items of jewellery from the Queen's Barrow inhumation at Arras.

== See also ==
- Arras Culture
- British Iron Age
- Chariot burial
- Danes Graves
- Burton Fleming
