= Arras culture =

Archaeological culture of the Middle Iron Age in East Yorkshire, England

The Arras culture is an archaeological culture of the Middle Iron Age in East Yorkshire, England. It takes its name from the cemetery site of Arras, at Arras Farm, (53.86°N 0.59°W) near Market Weighton, which was discovered in the 19th century. The site spans three fields, bisected by the main east-west road between Market Weighton and Beverley, and is arable farmland; little to no remains are visible above ground. The extent of the Arras culture is loosely associated with the Parisi tribe of pre-Roman Britain.

The culture is defined by its burial practices, which are uncommon outside East Yorkshire, but are found in continental Europe, and show some similarities with those of the La Tène culture. The inhumations include chariot burials, or burials in square enclosures, or both; in contrast to continental inhumations, the cemeteries were crowded, not extended, and the chariots typically disassembled. The burials have been dated from the latter part of the 1st millennium BC to the Roman conquest (about 70 AD). The burial goods and chariot designs were primarily British in style, not continental. Many of the archaeological finds are in the Yorkshire Museum and the British Museum.

== Background ==
The site was first investigated by a group of local gentry in 1815–1817, including William Watson, the Rev E. W. Stillingfleet, and Barnard Clarkson. Their investigations were detailed, encompassing the excavation of more than a hundred barrows in fields north and south of the Market Weighton to Beverley road, now the A1079. Many of the excavation details have been lost, but detailed recording was undertaken of four barrows with the richest grave goods. They were named the King's Barrow, the Queen's Barrow, the Lady's Barrow and the Charioteer's Barrow by the excavators. Work in 1850 by John Thurnam of the Yorkshire Antiquarian Club led to further investigations of these barrows; Thurnam published a report detailing the human remains from his excavation.

== Society ==
Recent excavations at Thornton (c.17km from Arras Farm and c.6km from the large cemetery at Pocklington) have revealed iron smelting to be firmly established during the Middle Iron Age in the area and was likely linked to the Arras culture. Arras graves frequently contain iron metalwork. While researchers believe these items may have originated from smithing sites in the lowlands, those sites in turn may have relied on iron smelting sites like Thornton. The large-scale, communal nature of the smelting at Thornton also suggests it supported the significant demand for iron tools and funerary goods required by these communities. A 2026 study showed some evidence that matriclans, matriliny and matrilocality were practiced by the makers of the Arras material culture. It also shows no significant genetic connection between those people and Celtic peoples in Gaul, meaning archaeological similarities are likely due to cultural diffusion rather than mass migration of people.

== Chariot burials ==
The site of the Arras cemetery is about 200 metres (220 yd) long and some 100 barrows were identified, four of which contained chariot burials. The name of the site lends itself to the culture, archaeologically based around chariot burials, across North and East Yorkshire. Other sites that are part of the Arras culture are so named because of the prevalence of cart-burials (two wheels) and/or wagon-burials (four wheels) or small finds similar to those from Arras, which are otherwise rare or unique in the British Iron Age. Other sites of similar La Tène period burials within the Arras culture, often with chariot burials include: Cawthorne Camps, Pexton Moor, Seamer, Hunmanby, Burton Fleming, Danes Graves, Garton, Wetwang, Middleton on the Wolds, Beverley and Hornsea. The small number of chariot burials, even within the Arras culture, suggests that people buried with chariots were a local elite and this is supported by high-quality metalwork and imported materials (such as coral) in grave goods.

The Pocklington Iron Age burial ground is a prehistoric cemetery discovered in 2014 on the outskirts of Pocklington in the East Riding of Yorkshire, England. In 2017, the ongoing excavations uncovered a rare chariot burial comprising an Iron Age chariot and two horses dated to about BC 320 to 174. Although chariot burials have been found elsewhere in the UK, the one at Pocklington is the first to have been found with horses also interred. The remains of the presumed driver, most likely a high-status individual, also were found, along with iron fragments from the chariot's body. The wooden elements of the chariot had rotted away, but had mostly been preserved as stains in the ground. One wheel had been destroyed, probably by ploughing. A bronze shield in the grave was exceptionally well preserved.

The shield's boss bears a resemblance to the Wandsworth shield boss (circa BC 350 to 150), owned by the British Museum. One design element on the Pocklington shield, a scalloped border, "is not comparable to any other Iron Age finds across Europe, adding to its valuable uniqueness", said Paula Ware, managing director at MAP Archaeological Practice Ltd. "The discoveries are set to widen our understanding of the Arras (Middle Iron Age) culture and the dating of artefacts to secure contexts is exceptional," Ware added.

=== Other burials ===
The number of non-chariot burials vastly outweighs those with chariots. Such burials are always inhumations within a square barrow. Skeletal remains in the graves are laid out most commonly on a north-south axis where the head is facing north. The skeletons at Burton Fleming have been identified in three major poses: extended fully, with the legs bent at the knees (sometimes drawn up parallel with the thigh) and with the legs drawn up against the chest. Grave goods include metalwork, ceramics and animal remains. Pig and horse bones are frequently associated with the burials.

== Arras graves ==
The original excavations by William Watson uncovered more than 100 square-barrows, square earthworks several metres long containing a single inhumation grave often accompanied by grave-goods. Material uncovered in the graves is of particularly high quality and is often unique in Iron Age Britain and includes copper-alloys, iron, animal bone, coral, jet and enamel. Of the four barrows, most material from the King's Barrow, the Queen's Barrow, and the Charioteer's Barrow is accessioned to the Yorkshire Museum and the Lady's Barrow to the British Museum.

=== King's Barrow ===
Although little remained of the earthwork at the time of excavation, the barrow measured 8 metres (26 ft) in diameter and covered a circular grave 3.5 metres (11 ft) in diameter and 45 centimetres (18 in) deep It contained the body of a man, orientated on a north-south axis, above the remains of a two-wheeled cart. The wheels were placed above the skull of a horse. The wooden frame of the cart did not survive, but the iron tyres, nave-hoops, iron and copper linch pins did. Terret rings and other harness fittings were also recovered.

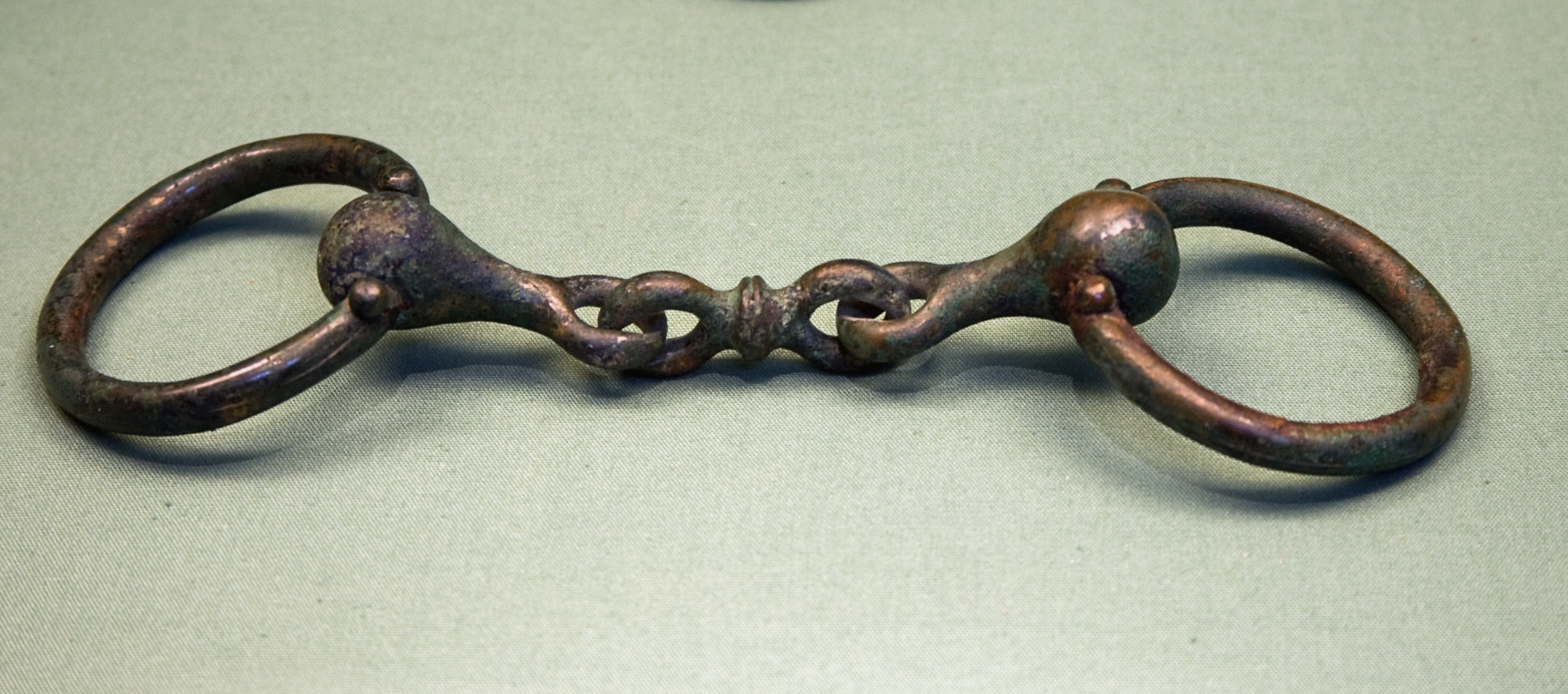
Horse-bit from the King's Barrow, now in the British Museum

=== Queen's Barrow ===
The Queen's Barrow is the only one of the four named graves that does not include a chariot burial. Small finds from this site are primarily items of personal decoration: a coral brooch, a disc pendant (with coral inlay), two bracelets, a gold ring, an amber ring, a bronze ring, a toilet-set and a necklace of green and blue glass beads.

=== Charioteer's Barrow ===
The Charioteer's Barrow measured 3.5 metres (11 ft) in diameter and stood 60 centimetres (24 in) high at the time of excavation. Despite the grave containing a chariot burial and grave goods, no skeletal remains were recorded. It is probable that the records have been lost, rather than the grave did not contain an inhumation. Iron tyres, nave-loops and other harness fittings were removed from the barrow.

=== Lady's Barrow ===
The Lady's Barrow contained a female skeleton and a dismantled two-wheeled chariot. Its earthwork measured 4.3 metres (14 ft) in diameter and was 45 centimetres (18 in) high. The inhumation pit was 3.6 metres (12 ft) in diameter and 1 metre (3 ft 3 in) deep. Details of the in situ remains are well-recorded:

Underneath the head of the woman was a mirror. Behind the back were the iron tires of two wheels laid partly the one over the other, and within each tire were two bronze hoops, those of the corresponding naves, and a circular piece of iron. In front of the face were two bits laid slightly above the bottom of the grave.

— William Greenwell; "Early Iron Age burials in Yorkshire", 1906.

== See also ==
- British Iron Age
- Burton Fleming
- Chariot burial
- Danes Graves
- La Tène culture
- Wetwang Slack
- William Greenwell
