= Danes Graves =

Archaeological site in the East Riding of Yorkshire, England

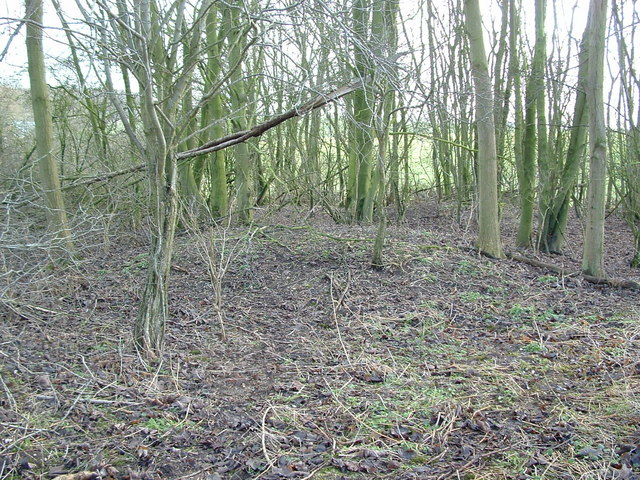
- A shallow barrow at Danes Graves

- Map showing the location of Danes Graves in the East Riding of Yorkshire
- 54.055610°N 0.44638196°W
- Type: Iron Age Cemetery
- Cultures: Arras Culture
- Location: near Kilham, East Riding of Yorkshire
- Region: Yorkshire

Site notes
- Public access: In dense woodland

Danes Graves is an archaeological site in the East Riding of Yorkshire. It forms part of the Arras Culture of inhumation and chariot burial prevalent in the region during the British Iron Age. It is a prehistoric cemetery site situated in Danesdale – a dry river valley with gravel and chalk deposits. The site is north of Driffield near the village of Kilham.

== Archaeological background ==
The earliest recorded excavation on the site of Danes Graves was in 1721, when several barrows were investigated, although no records of any findings now exist. The Yorkshire Antiquarian Club (who excavated at Arras, excavated six barrows in 1849, and William Greenwell opened 14 over a two-day period in March 1864. The other major figure in the recording of the Danes Graves cemetery is John Robert Mortimer, who claims that his application in 1871 to excavate more extensively was blocked because of Greenwell's lax excavation technique. The landowner, William Henry Harrison-Broadley responded that

"The investigations have been conducted so recklessly, so carelessly, and even so indecently – the graves were not even filled up again – that I am determined not to again allow them to be disturbed".

Large-scale excavations took place between 1897–98, following Harrison-Broadley's death and were run jointly by Greenwell and Mortimer.

Under Greenwell and Mortimer, an additional 53 barrows were excavated. Later reports by both men identified a range of sizes in the diameter of each barrow between 3-10metres. The graves were shallow and earthworks above rose to less than 1 metre.

Grave goods within the barrows were varied. Of 114 skeletons recorded from the site, brooches were evident in 30 of which 17 included ceramics, 6 included bracelets, 2 included beads, and one had a pin. The assemblage is similar to that of the Iron Age cemetery at Burton Fleming. A single chariot burial is recorded on the site which is now accessioned to the Yorkshire Museum.

The vast majority of skeletons were aligned on a north-south axis; a trait evident across Arras Culture sites and all were recorded as being found in a crouched position.

== See also ==
- Arras Culture
- British Iron Age
- Wetwang Slack
- Chariot burial
- Burton Fleming
