= Kendrick's Cave Decorated Horse Jaw =

Portable Ice Age artwork found in Wales

- Genogl Ogof Kendrick
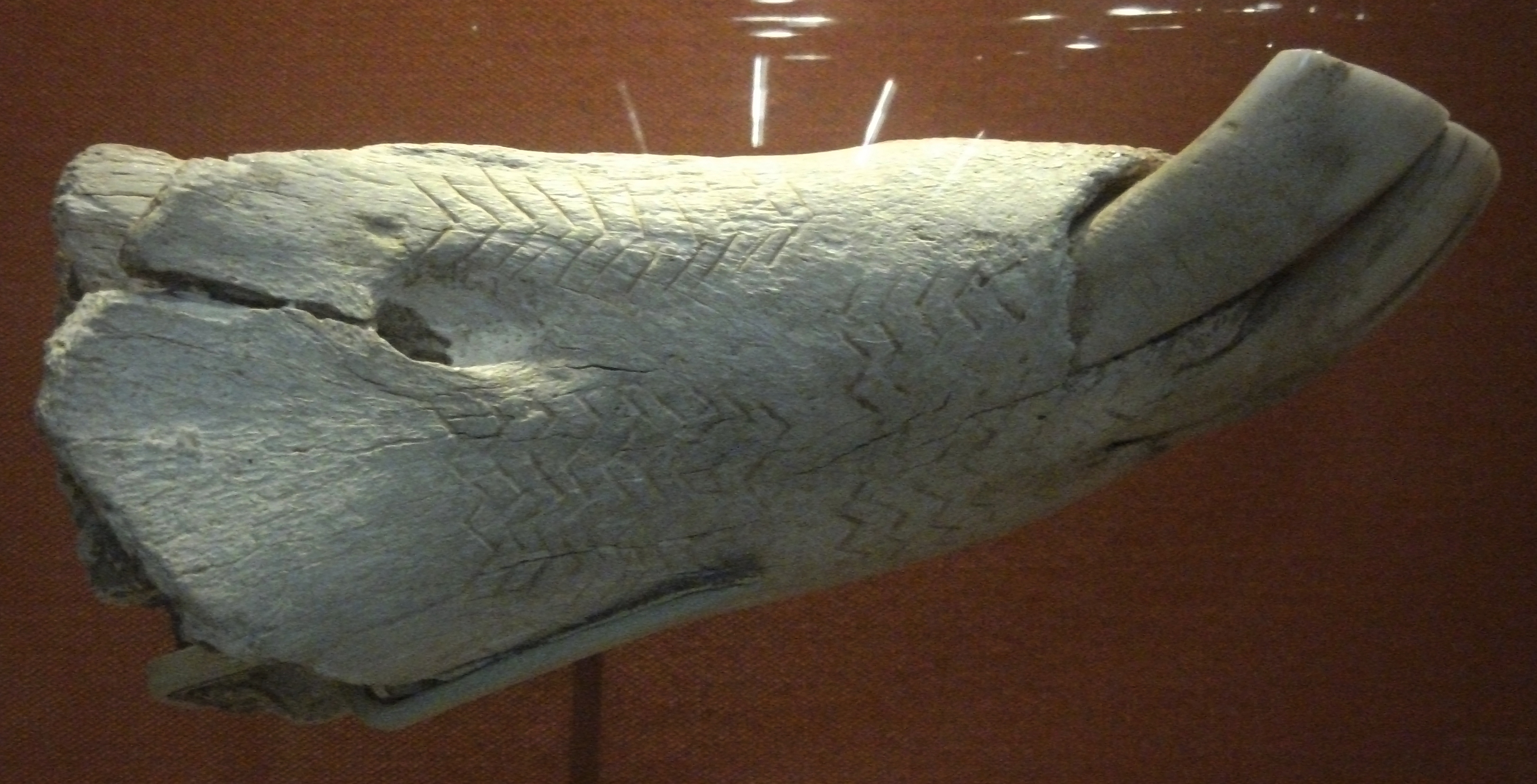
- Period/culture: Paleolithic era 10,000 years old
- Discovered: Kendrick's Cave, Llandudno
- Present location: British Museum

The Kendrick's Cave Decorated Horse Jaw (Welsh: Genogl Ogof Kendrick) is one of the finest pieces of portable artwork dated to the end of the last Ice Age or Late Glacial period that has been found in Britain. Others in Britain include the Robin Hood Cave Horse and the Pin Hole Cave man. It is the oldest known piece of portable art from Wales.

When originally acquired by the British Museum in 1959, the jaw was dated to between 8,000 and 25,000 years old but radiocarbon dating methods have enabled it to more accurately dated to the Upper Palaeolithic era, about 10,000 years ago.

The jaw was found by Thomas Kendrick, a lapidarist, in 1880 at Kendrick's Cave, Llandudno, Wales. It now forms part of the Christy Collection in the British Museum, where it is normally on display in Room 2. In 2013 it was displayed in the exhibition at the British Museum Ice Age Art: Arrival of the Modern Mind.

== Features and imagery ==
The jaw consists of a 13.8 cm piece of bone, with three remaining incisor teeth.

The underside includes incised blocks of zig-zag decoration created using a flint tool, possibly with a fairly short cutting edge. The zig-zag or herringbone effect is formed by five panels of incised chevrons. Each panel differs from the other with respect to the number of lines deployed, its length and width. Some lines meet neatly at the apex of the incision – while others overlap. The artwork may have been enhanced with ochre in the Ice Age – but all traces have long since disappeared. Either way, the incised lines create an effect whereby the areas between the incisions appear raised and dynamic.

== See also ==
- Archaeology of Wales
- Prehistoric art
- Prehistoric Wales
