= Creswell Crags =

Gorge with caves in East Midlands, England

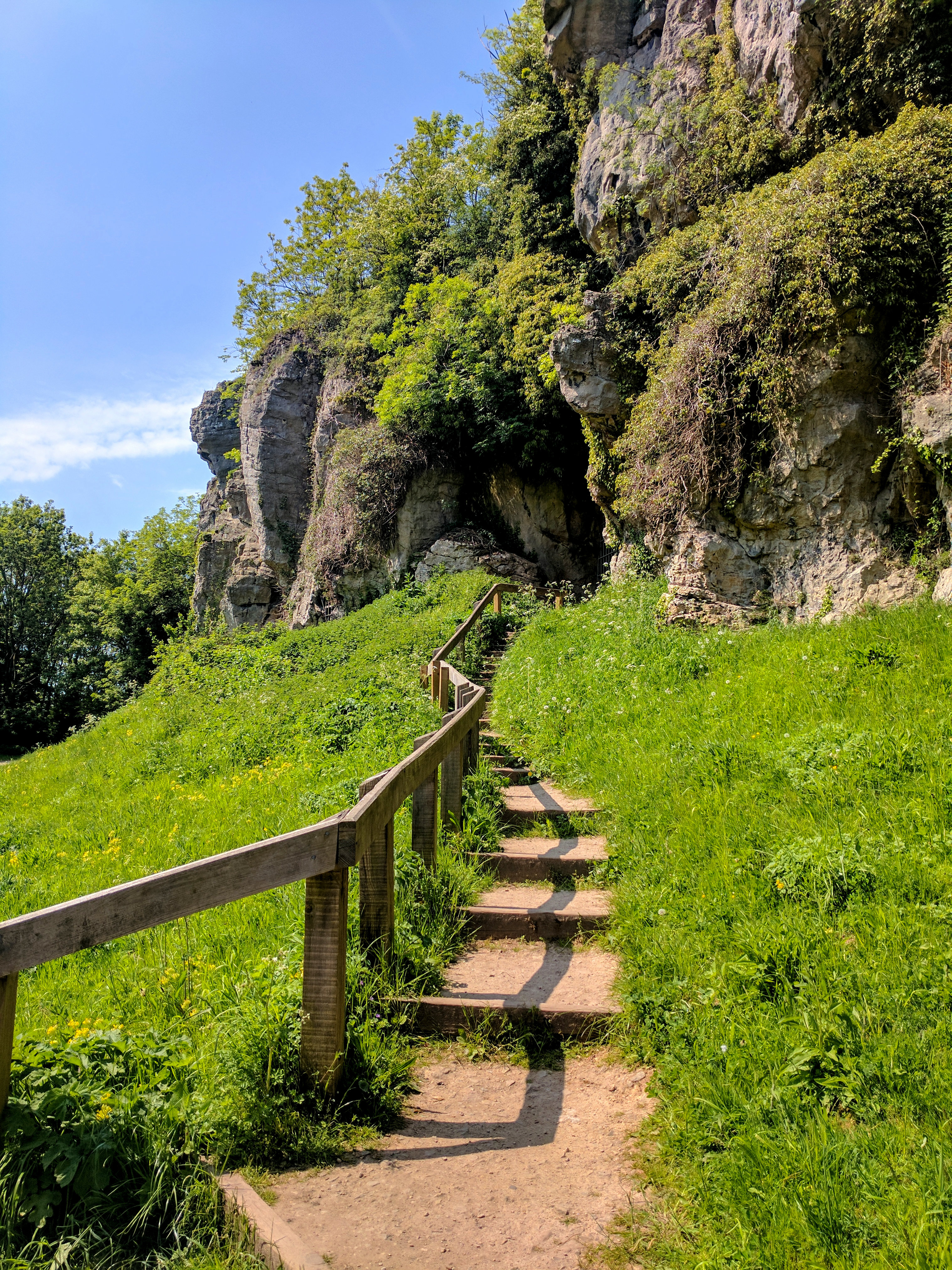
- Pin Hole Cave
- Interactive map of Creswell Crags
- Location: Crags Road, Welbeck, Worksop, Nottinghamshire, S80 3LH
- Coordinates: 53°15′49″N 1°11′38″W
- Geology: Limestone
- Access

Scheduled monument
- Official name: Palaeolithic and later prehistoric sites at Creswell Gorge including Pinhole Cave, Mother Grundy's Parlour and Robin Hood Cave
- Reference no.: 1003770
- Website: https://www.creswell-crags.org.uk/

Creswell Crags is an enclosed limestone gorge on the border between Derbyshire and Nottinghamshire, England, near the villages of Creswell and Whitwell. The cliffs in the ravine contain several caves that were occupied by Neanderthals and modern humans during the Last Glacial Period, between around 60,000 and 10,000 years ago. The caves contain Upper Palaeolithic cave art, the northernmost cave art in Europe with other Palaeolithic art objects having also been found in the caverns.

The caves contain occupation layers with evidence of flint tools including those of the Neanderthal-made Mousterian, and the modern human-made Lincombian-Ranisian-Jerzmanowician, Gravettian, and the eponymous Creswellian cultures.

== Layout ==
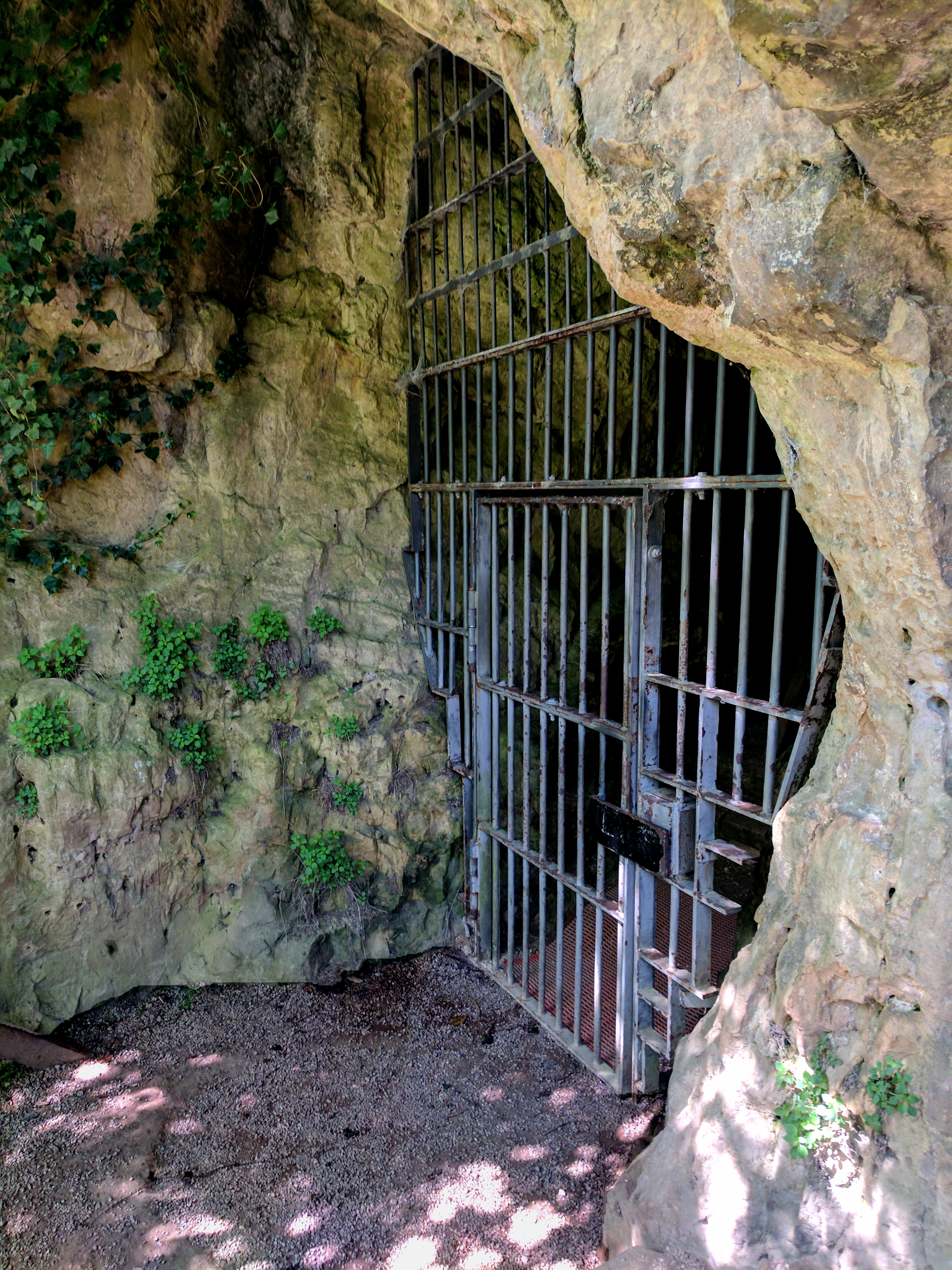
Robin Hood Cave

Creswell Crags contains a number of distinct caves which have yielded paleontological and archaeological remains:

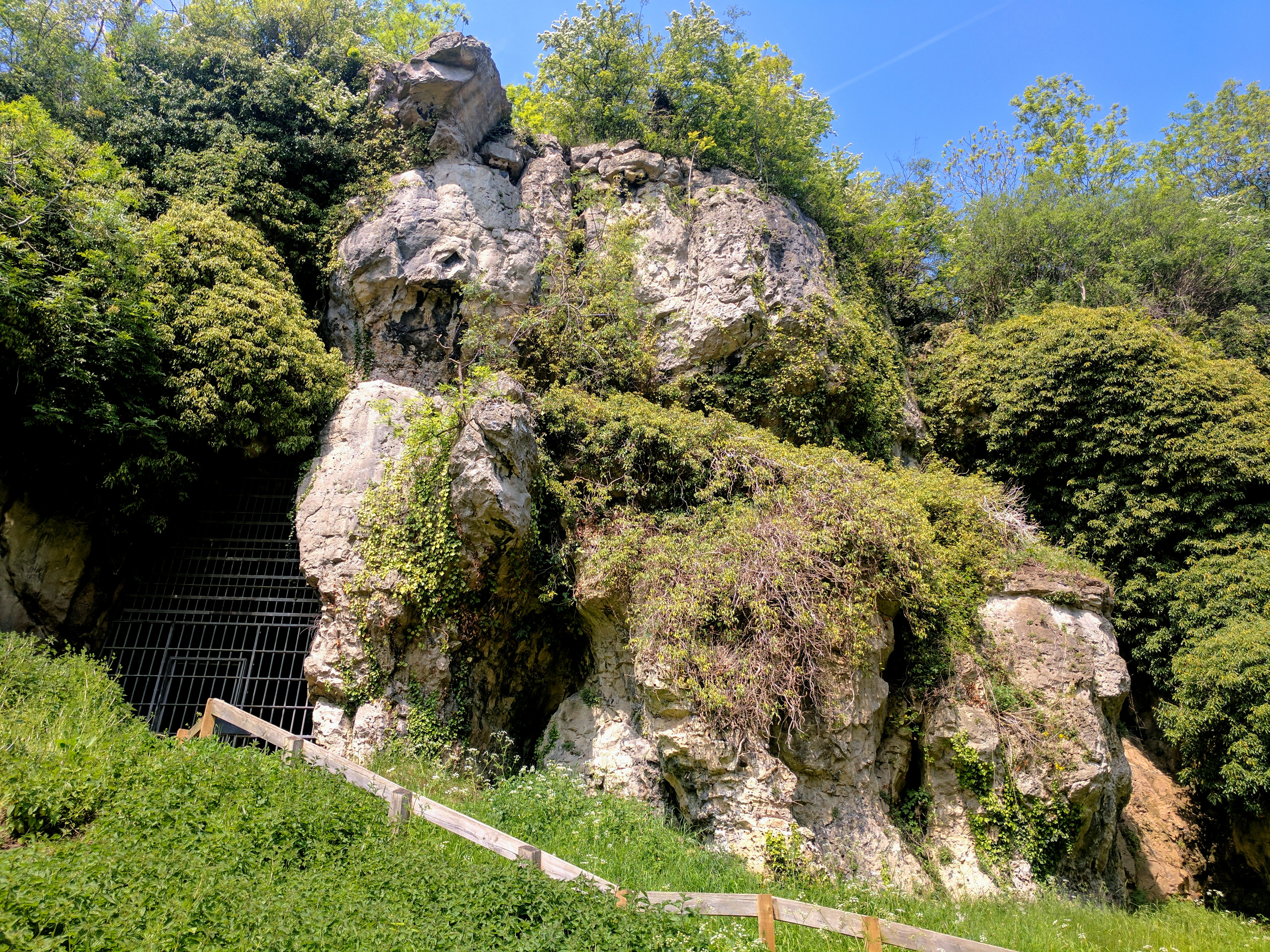
- Pin Hole Cave
  Mother Grundy's Parlour, which has produced numerous flint tools and split bones and was occupied until Mesolithic times.
- Robin Hood Cave, the location of a bone engraved with a horse's head.
- The Pin Hole, the location of the Pinhole Cave Man, a human figure engraved on bone and discovered in the 1920s, and an ivory pin with etched lines.
- Church Hole, with more than 80 engravings on its walls and occupied intermittently until Roman times.

== Archaeological and paleontological finds ==
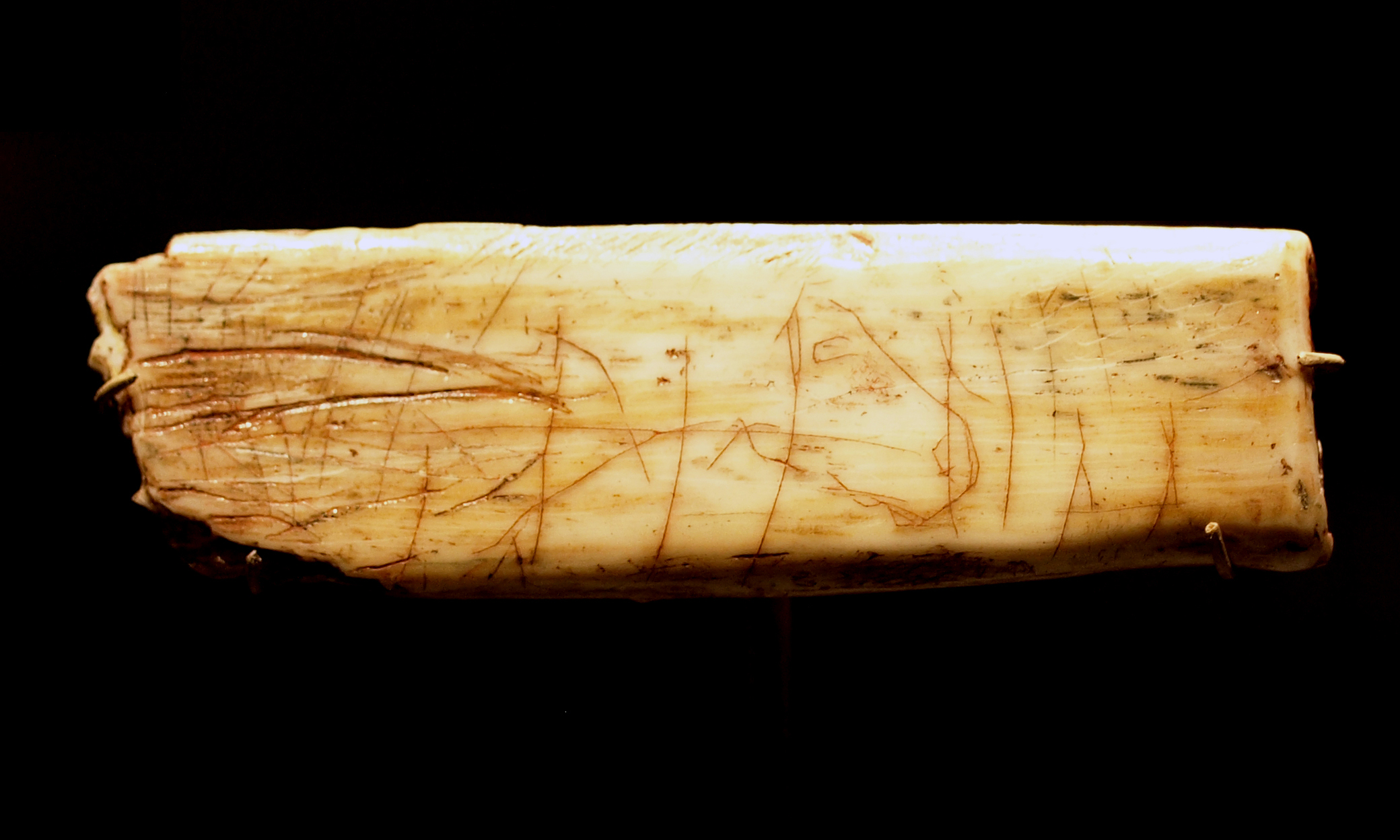
Robin Hood Cave horse engraving found in 1876

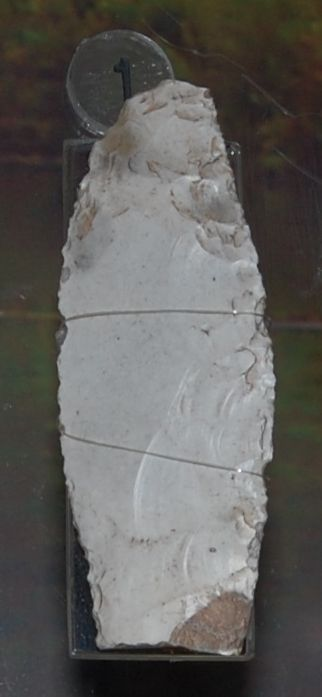
A leaf-point from Creswell Crags, at Derby Museum

In Mother Grundy's Parlour, in layers dating to the Last Interglacial (130,000–115,000 years ago), when Britain had a similar temperate climate and forested landscape to modern times (though Britain was likely uninhabited by humans), remains of hippopotamus and the extinct narrow-nosed rhinoceros have been found.

All of the major caves in the Creswell Crags, but especially Robin Hood Cave, show evidence of having been occupied during the late Middle Paleolithic (probably around 60,000–40,000 years ago) by Neanderthals, who created a variety of stone tools, including scrapers, choppers and bifacial tools found in the caverns, primarily using quartzite from local Triassic aged "bunter" pebble beds. The Creswell Crags show the most intensive evidence of occupation by Neanderthals of any site in Britain.

Robin Hood Cave and Pin Hole Cave have also yielded Initial Upper Paleolithic stone tools of the Lincombian-Ranisian-Jerzmanowician industry that are likely more than 36,000 years old, representing some of the oldest evidence for modern humans in Britain. Although no diagnostic Aurignacian stone tools have been found at Creswell Crags, a clearly human-modified antler from Pin Hole has been dated to the Aurignacian period, around 37,000 years ago. "Maisierian"-type tanged stone points found in Pin Hole indicate that Creswell Crags was later occupied by early Gravettian peoples, probably about 33,000 years ago.

Following the abandonment of Britain by modern humans due to the harsh environmental conditions in the time surrounding the Last Glacial Maximum, Britain was recolonised by Magdalenian peoples around 16-15,000 years ago. Magdalenian stone tools found at Creswell Crags have been assigned to the Creswellian industry named after the site. Creswellian stone tools have also been found in temporally equivalent sediments elsewhere in Britain, as distant as Kents Cavern in Devon.

A bone engraved with a horse's head and other worked bone items along with the remains of a variety of prehistoric animals have been found in excavations since 1876. The "Ochre Horse" was found on 29 June 1876 at the back of the western chamber in the Robin Hood Cave. In 2003, the Ochre Horse was estimated to be between 11,000 and 13,000 years old.

A canine tooth of the sabre-toothed cat Homotherium latidens was also excavated from Robin Hood Cave in 1876, one of only a handful of finds of this cat known from Britain. The tooth may have been transported into the cave by humans as is suggested for the canine sabre teeth of Homotherium found in Kents Cavern in Devon.

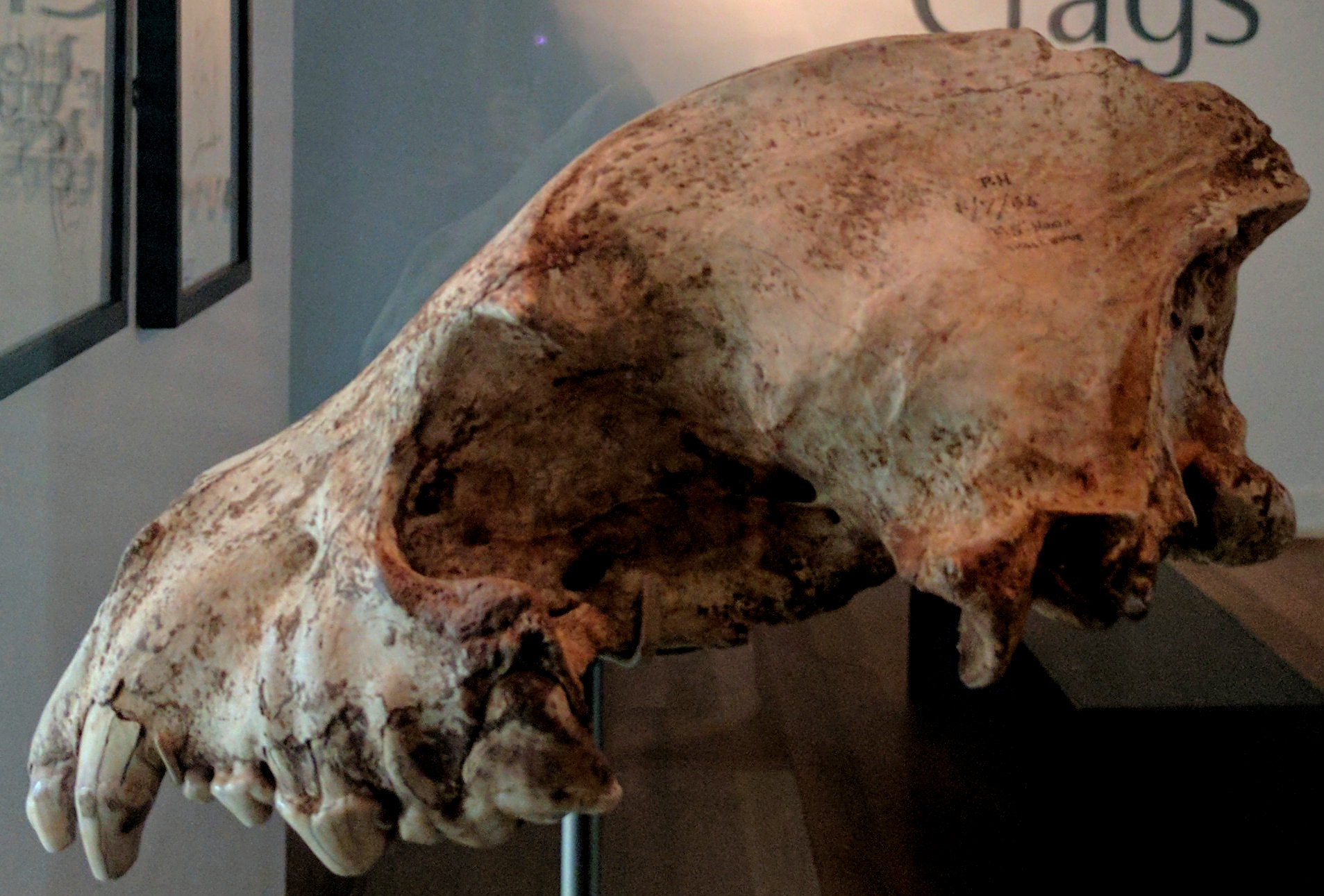
Skull of a cave hyena at Creswell Crags museum

Other remains found in Robin Hood Cave, which dates to the primarily to the Last Glacial Period (though spanning from shortly prior to the Last Glacial Period to historical times), includes those of cave hyenas, wolves, red foxes, brown bears, woolly mammoth, woolly rhinoceros, wild horse, wild boar, reindeer and red deer. Evidence has been found for the butchery of mountain hare by humans in the cave. At Pinhole Cave, animals found there (that are not found in Robin Hood Cave) include Irish elk, cave lions, steppe bison and Russet ground squirrels.

Neolithic, Bronze Age, Roman, Medieval and post-Medieval artifacts have also been found at Creswell Crags, such as pottery and antique coins.

=== Cave art ===
In April 2003, engravings and bas-reliefs were found on the walls and ceilings of some of the caves, an important find as it had previously been thought that no British cave art existed. The discoveries, made by Paul Bahn, Sergio Rippoll and Paul Pettitt, included an animal originally identified as an ibex but later confirmed as a stag. These, and subsequent finds included carvings on the ceiling of Church Hole Cave, have made Creswell a site of international importance. The finds are the most northerly yet discovered in Europe. Their subject matter includes representations of animals including bison and, arguably, several different bird species. Some workers, however, consider that the "bird" figures are more likely to be female anthropomorphs. The engravers seem to have made use of the naturally uneven cave surface in their carvings and it is likely that they relied on the early-morning sunlight entering the caves to illuminate the art.

Thin layers of calcium carbonate flowstone overlaying some of the engravings were dated using the uranium-series disequilibrium method, which showed the oldest of these flowstones to have formed at least 12,800 years ago. This provides a minimum age for the underlying engraving. The scientists and archaeologists concluded that it was most likely the engravings were contemporary with evidence for occupation at the site during the late glacial interstadial around 13,000–15,000 years ago. Most of the engravings are found in Church Hole Cave on the Nottinghamshire side of the gorge. Since this discovery, however, an engraved reindeer from a cave on the Gower Peninsula has yielded two minimum dates (through uranium-series dating) of 12,572 years BP and 14,505 years BP.

Not all of the figures identified as prehistoric art are in fact human made. An example given by archaeologists Paul Bahn and Paul Pettitt is the 'horse-head', Which they say is "highly visible and resembles a heavily maned horse-head... lacks any trace of work: it is a combination of erosion, black stains for the head, and natural burrow cast reliefs for the mane." Others are a 'bison-head' which they think may be natural and a 'bear' image which "lacks any evidence of human work." Notwithstanding they believe that more figures may be discovered in the future.

The site was the subject of the BBC Radio 4 documentaries Unearthing Mysteries, Nature and Drawings on the Wall, and featured in the 2005 BBC Two television programme Seven Natural Wonders, as one of the wonders of the Midlands. In the Drawings on the Wall (Episode 1) Dr Paul Pettitt was interviewed about the so-called 'naked ladies' engravings in Church Hole Cave.

== Tourism and museum ==
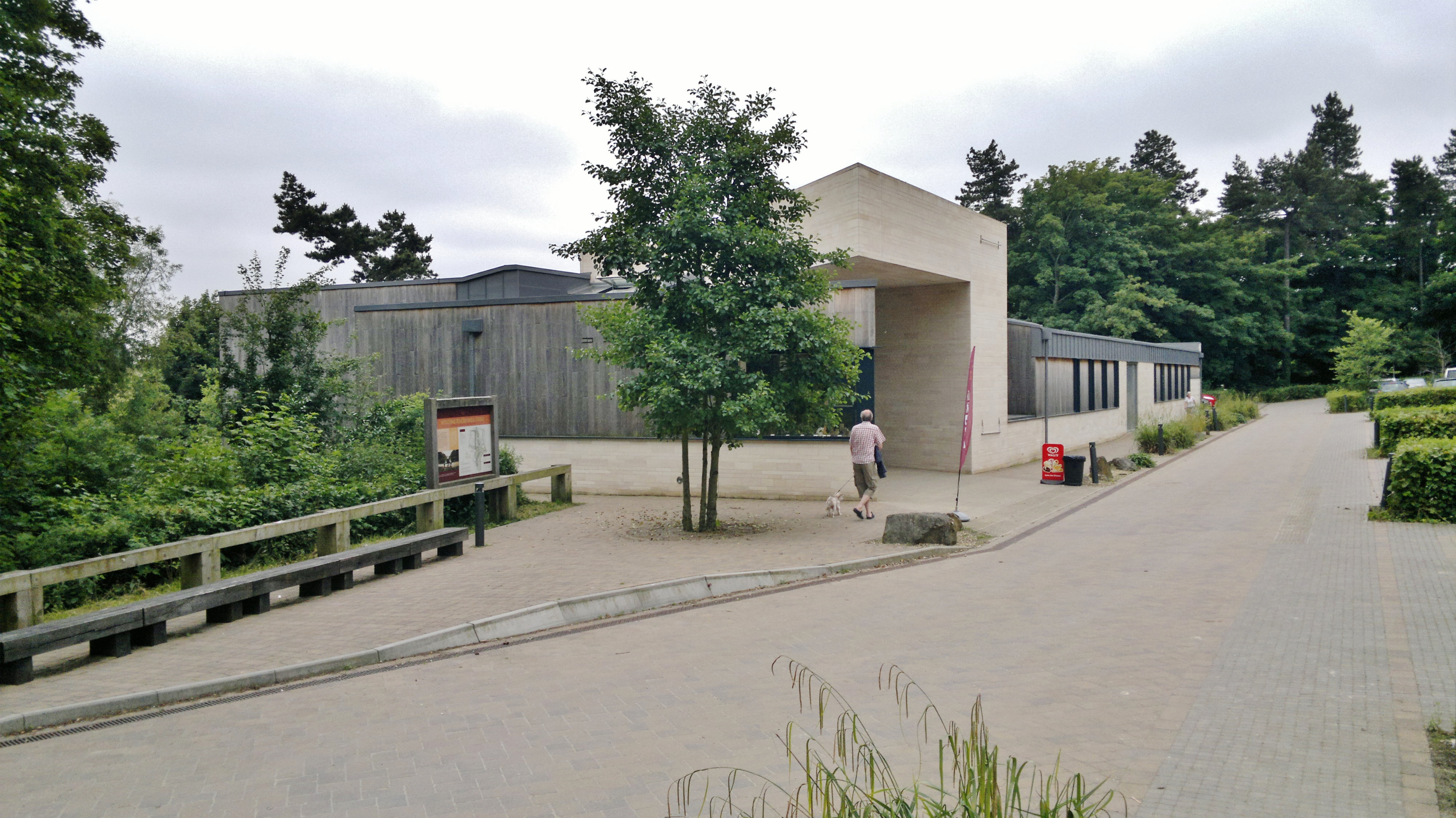
Creswell Crags Visitor Centre

The site is open to the public and has a visitor centre with a small museum of objects associated with the caves, including a cave hyena model. There is a cafe in the visitor centre.

== Designations ==
Creswell Crags
- Site of Special Scientific Interest
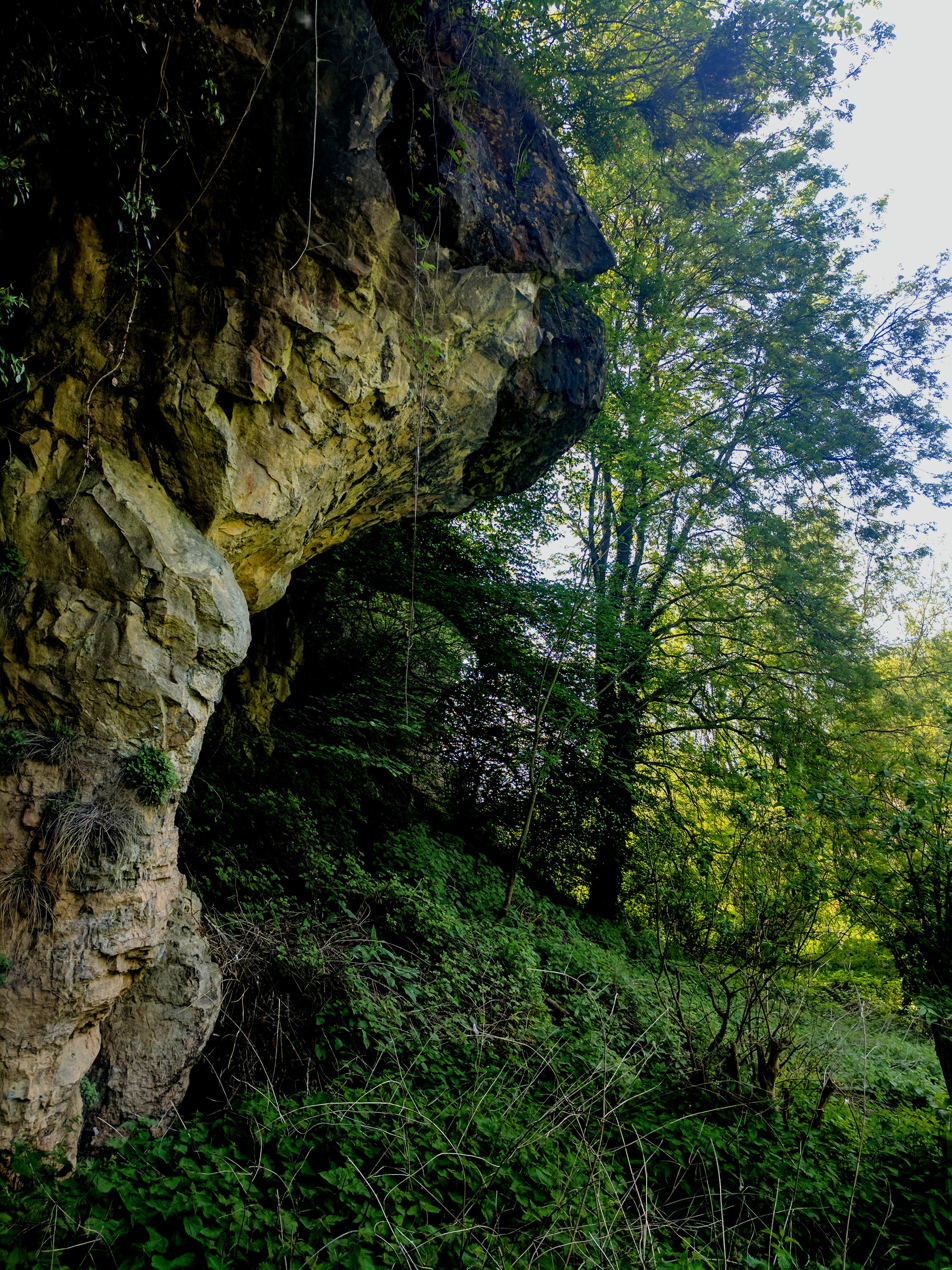
- Church Hole Cave
- Location of Creswell Crags.
- Area of search: Nottinghamshire/Derbyshire
- Interest: Biological; Geological
- Area: 0.19 km² The Creswell Crags have been designated as a Site of Special Scientific Interest (SSSI) since 1981, and also designated as a scheduled monument.

Creswell Crags first applied for World Heritage Site status in 1986, but was unsuccessful. Since then further research and development has been carried out and, in 2011, it was again put forward for consideration. In 2012 it was added to the United Kingdom's 'tentative list' – an essential prerequisite to formal nomination, evaluation and potential inscription as a World Heritage Site. The Tentative List identifies the universal outstanding value of Creswell Crags as being:

1. The outstanding landscape of a narrow limestone gorge containing a complex of caves having long-intact palaeoenvironmental cave and gorge sediment sequences, containing rich cultural archaeological remains as well as diverse animal bone, plant macro- and micro-fossil assemblages
2. In situ Palaeolithic rock art on the walls and ceilings of caves, dated directly to 13,000 years ago, providing direct cultural associations with Late Magdalenian human groups operating at extreme northern latitudes

In addition, Creswell Crags' significance has been enhanced by the discovery of a number of pieces of portable art made of engraved bone – the UK's only known figurative Ice Age art – as well as assemblages of bone, stone and ivory tools.

Creswell Crags was removed from the World Heritage Site tentative list in 2023.

== See also ==
- William Boyd Dawkins
- Hamburg culture
- Ahrensburg culture
- Palaeolithic art
- Swanscombe Palaeolithic site
- List of Sites of Special Scientific Interest in Derbyshire
