= Alfred Rust =

- Born: July 4, 1900; Hamburg, German Empire
- Died: August 14, 1983 (aged 83); Ahrensburg, West Germany
- Known for: Work on the prehistory of Germany, the Levant and Near East
- Awards: Albrecht-Penck-Medaille (1966)
- Scientific career
- Fields: Archaeology

Alfred Rust (July 4, 1900 – August 14, 1983) was a German prehistoric archaeologist. Though self-taught, he became a pioneer in the study of the Hamburgian culture of the late Paleolithic, especially through his excavations in northern Germany.

B.E. Roveland, University of Massachusetts Amherst, commenting on self-taught archaeologists who played a major role from 1930 and onwards in archaeological discoveries in northern Germany, specifically cited Rust as "the most effective of these amateurs, whose work on the now classic sites of Meiendorf and Stellmoor launched the study of the Hamburgian period."

== Youth ==
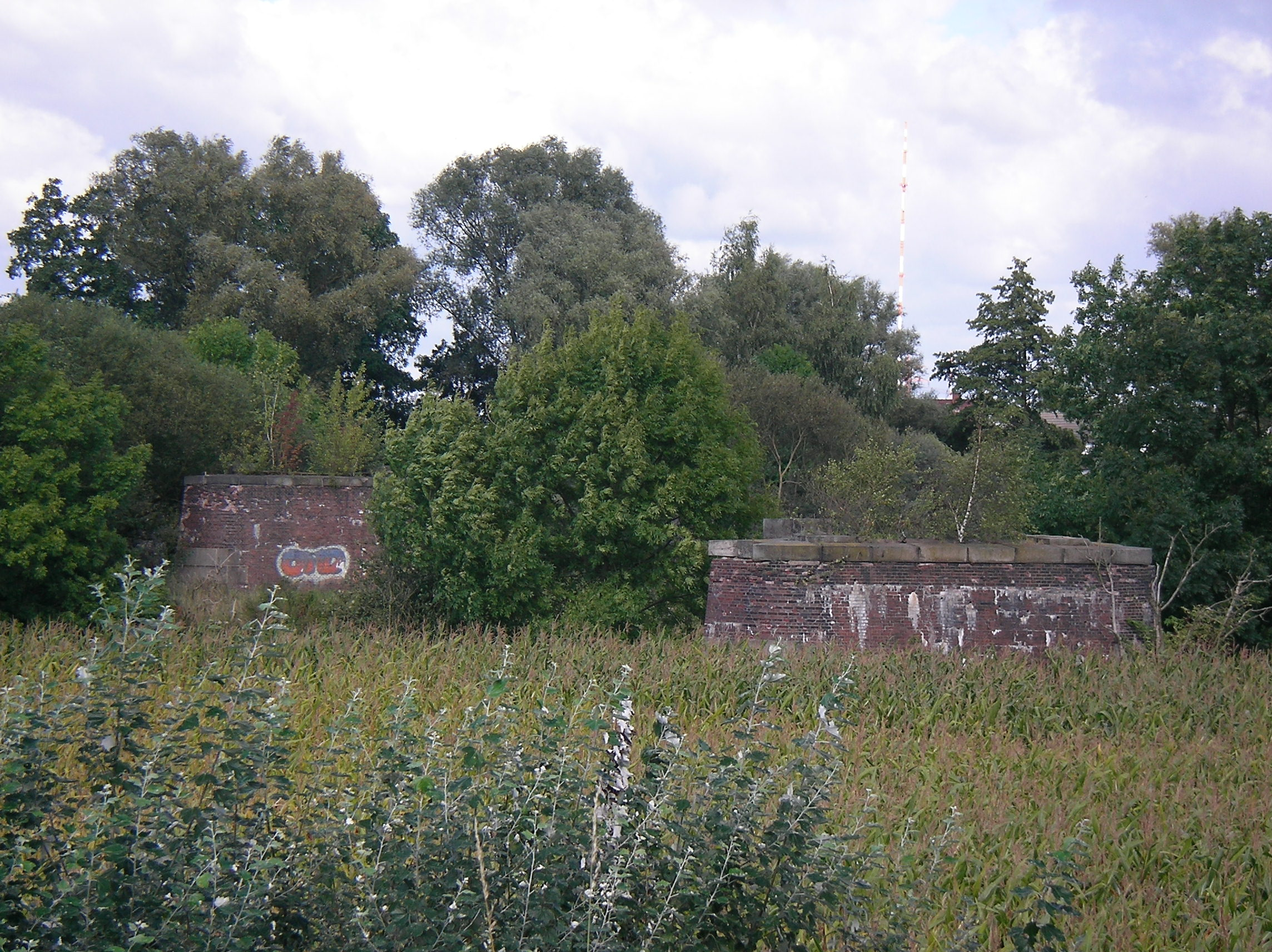
The swampy landscape around Hamburg has hardly changed since the days when Rust was a child (other than the graffiti on the little bridge over the Dove, an arm of the Elbe, and the antenna in the background ...).

Coming from a very modest family, raised by his single mother, Alfred Rust loved observing nature in the moors and marshes surrounding the city of Hamburg as a child. As a young man he trained as an electrical worker, but enrolled in night classes at the Institute of Archaeology of Hamburg (Volkshochschule zur Archäologie). He was hard working and passionate about prehistory, drawing the attention and kindness of his teachers.

== Journey to the Middle East ==
To better understand the origin of Paleolithic stone tools in Central Europe, (and no doubt attracted by the discovery in 1928 by Dorothy Garrod of the Natufian culture in Wadi en-Natuf in the current West Bank) Rust began a bike trip to the Middle East in 1930 with a friend. Leaving from Hamburg on 1 September, they crossed the Balkans, Turkey, Syria, Palestine, and finally succeeded at the cost many adventures and sufferings to Alexandria in Egypt. Exhausted and suffering from disease, Rust was hospitalized at the Danish hospital in Nebek, north of Damascus. During his convalescence, and for several months, he explored and excavated the caves carved into the cliffs of the wadi (valley) of Skifta, near the small town of Yabrud. He discovered, with the help of his friend and some local laborers, one of the most important Palaeolithic sites in the Middle East. The adventurous story of this discovery and the results of his excavations at Yabrud were published by Rust between the years 1931 and 1933 in Offa, the journal of Archaeology led by Gustav Schwantes (Rust's mentor) and Herbert Jankuhn.

== Maturity ==
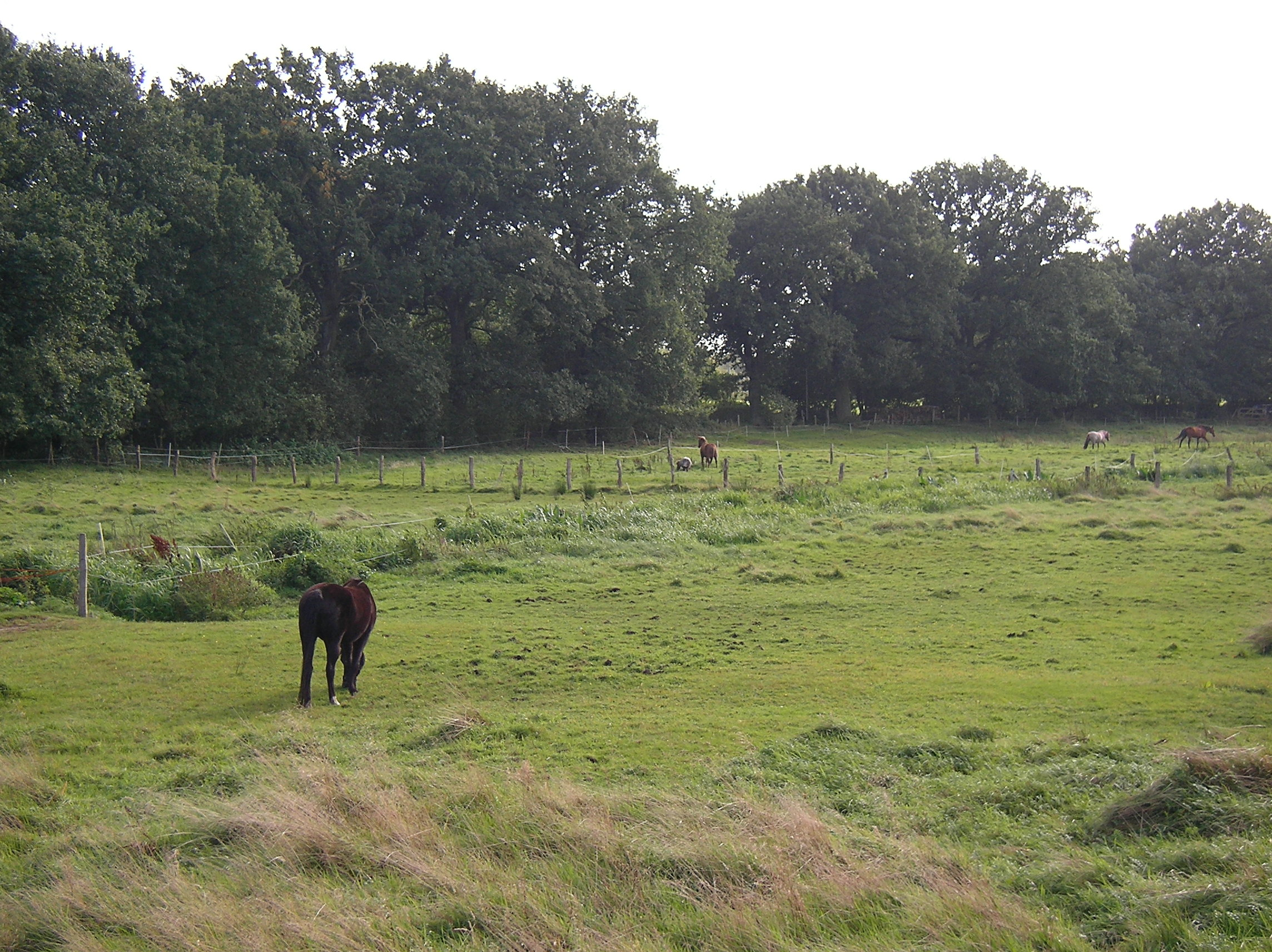
The lush meadows of Meiendorf (Schleswig-Holstein), where Rust began digging in 1930. Note the channels draining the water into a sump, and wetland vegetation.

After his return to Germany, Rust worked for an electricity company and pursued his vocation as an amateur archaeologist. He was encouraged by the pre-historian Gustav Schwantes, who was also self-taught in his youth. With hard work and the spirit of innovation, Rust used new methods (soil coring, excavation in floodplains with drainage by pumps) to examine the layers of peat around the areas left by the melting of the ice sheet which currently form the Meiendorfer Ahrensburg valley, near Hamburg (in the district of Stormarn, State of Schleswig-Holstein).

In the 1930s, Rust discovered the remains of Paleolithic settlements (tents, homes, carving reliefs etc. ...) in particular Meiendorf, the type site of the Hamburg culture.

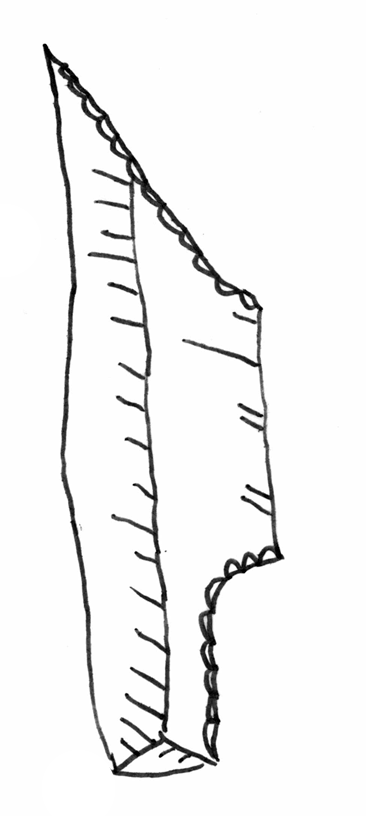
Kerbspitze (= "notched edge" in German) of flint with tang, typical of the Hamburgian culture

Rust showed (which was denied at the time) that groups of hunter-gatherers frequented the tundra stretching to the foot of the huge glaciers that covered northern Europe during the Ice Age. He found numerous flint tools (awls, scrapers, chisels for working bone and antler, pairs of blades for mounting on a pair of scissors) and carved stone, wood or bone weapons (spears). He also discovered the bones of sacrificed animals, especially deer, found intact except for a large stone which was placed intentionally in the thorax of each animal. Among his other notable discoveries: an amber plate with a hole and engraved figures (horse, bird, fish), a finely carved and incised stick, and a baton decorated with a large pair of reindeer antlers.

Rust, through his discoveries in the field excavations at Meiendorf, showed that reindeer hunters belonging to the Hamburg culture in the late Paleolithic were hunting in this region about 15000 years ago. During a period of warmer climate, about 13400 years ago, hunters belonging to the Magdalenian culture also lived at the foot of glaciers until a new cold period, 12,700 years ago, after which appeared the reindeer hunting Ahrensburg culture.

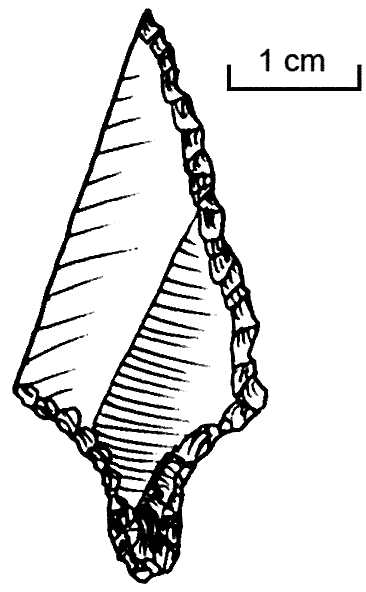
Arrowhead of the Ahrensburg culture. Note the small size, the thoroughness of the work, the tang at the base and the stem that allows a solid attachment to the shaft.

In Stellmoor ("marshy place" in German), a site representative of the Ahrensburg culture, by studying the weapons and their traces on the bones of game (perforations of the scapula in particular) Rust brought to light that the weapons and mode of hunting had evolved from the spear with a large blade to the smaller arrows made of pine with sharp points. Rust deduced that these different types of weapons matched a different hunting technique (as well as a social organization and lithic size): the spear was powerful but imprecise (used in killing large herds of reindeer driven by many beaters) and gave way to bow and arrows used in stalking, probably oriented thin by over-hunting and climate change.

== At the time of National Socialism ==
Rust was awarded an honorary doctorate from the University of Kiel on 1 June 1940. In the words of B.E. Roveland "Researchers [German archaeologists at sites in northern Germany] were followed with passion by a fascinated public, and in the socio-political and economic context of inter-war Germany, they caused a powerful movement of regional and national pride."

Rust had to yield to the entreaties of Wolfram Sievers (Director of the SS Ahnenerbe) and he joined the "Institute of ancestral heritage," which allowed him to escape conscription.

== After World War II ==
Rust was a member of the research department for prehistory (Landesamt für Vor-und Frühgeschichte) and worked on other tools of the Paleolithic. He also worked with the archaeologist Gustav Steffens in a series of excavations conducted on the "Stufe" (degree, escarpment) of Altona, near Wittenberg, and made important work on othercultures ("dating the Clactonian by the typology of tools, and Treene through geological stratigraphy").

Many of Rust's scientific findings were opposed from the year 1950 and scientific terminology that Rust had developed and he published in 1950 was abandoned in favor of the one established by a British archaeologist, Miss Dorothy Garrod.: ainsi la terminologie scientifique que Rust avait élaborée et qu'il publia en 1950. She continued his prospecting in the Holy Land where she had individualized Natufian culture in 1928, had excavated a site (the Mugharet el Emireh) in Lower Galilée. French archaeologists, F. Bordes and D. Sonneville-Bordes also searched the site at Yabrud in the years 1954–55.

However, in the 1990s, the originality of the work of Rust in Syria was recognized, especially his discovery of "previously unknown lithic industries, such as the Yabrudian and pre-Aurignacian.

And in the same year 1990, an excavation mission from Columbia University also made excavations at the site of Yabrud and its conclusions did justice to the vision of Rust, especially in the individualization of 45 layers of different cultures that had occupied it.

For its participation in the Ahnenerbe, Rust suffered criticism in his later years.

== Honours ==
Arms of the city of Ahrensburg : The baton decorated with a reindeer antler discovered by Rust appears under the representation of the castle.

Rust was made honorary doctorate in 1940 from the University of Kiel. In 1965, the town of Ahrensburg was made an honorary citizen. The baton decorated with a reindeer antlers discovered by Rust appears in the arms of the city, under the representation of the castle.

The Alfred-Rust-Wanderweg ("Promenade Alfred Rust"), from the station to Ahrensburg and east leading to Gute Stellen, was inaugurated in 2005.

A conference room for shows and exhibition, located Wulfdorfer Weg 71, 22926 Ahrensburg, was named "Alfred Rust Saal."

== Publications (excerpts) ==
- Rust, A., (De) Werkzeuge of Frühmenschen in Europa, Neumünster 1971.
- Rust, A., (De) Die Höhlenfunde von Jabrud (Syrian). Offa-Bücher 8, Neumünster, 1950.
- Rust, A., (De) Das altsteinzeitliche Rentierjägerlager Meiendorf, Neumünster 1937.
- Rust, A., (De) Die alt-und von mittelsteinzeitlichen Funde Stellmoor, Neumünster 1943.

== Sources ==
- (De) This article is partially or entirely from the Wikipedia article in German entitled "Alfred Rust" (see the list of authors)
- Documentary film "Das Geheimnis der Eiszeitjäger" ("Secrets of the hunters ice age"), Gisela.
- Graichen, Kay Sierig, Saskia & Weisheit (Germany, 2009), broadcast on Arte-TV Saturday, August 22, 2009.
