= Sherborne bone =

Forged paleolithic engraving on an animal rib

The Sherborne bone is a fragment of animal rib with a horse's head engraved on it, once dated to the Palaeolithic period, but now generally viewed as a modern forgery. The bone was found in 1911 in the rubble of a quarry near Sherborne in Dorset, by two schoolboys from the nearby Sherborne School. They presented it to their science master, Eliot Steel, who in turn sent it to Arthur Smith Woodward at the Natural History Museum, London. After Woodward published the discovery in 1914, its authenticity was the subject of dispute until radiocarbon dating proved that it could not be a genuine piece of Paleolithic art.

In 1994, radiocarbon dating showed that the bone was only about 700 years old. The engraving on it seems to have been inspired by the Robin Hood Cave Horse, a Paleolithic engraving from Derbyshire first published in 1877, and thus was presumably made at the end of the 19th or beginning of the 20th century.

== Discovery ==
In October 1911, Philip Grove and Arnaldo Cortesi, two boys at Sherborne School, presented a bone to their science master, Eliot Steel. Steel said that Cortesi had found it in a quarry near the school, where he had advised the boys that they could find fossils. Ross Jefferson, who had been a student at the Sherborne School a year ahead of Grove and Cortesi, later reported that Cortesi had been about to throw the bone into a fire when he had stopped him and advised him to show it to Steel.

Steel sent the bone to Arthur Smith Woodward at the Natural History Museum, who published it as "an apparent Palaeolithic engraving" of an ancient wild horse (equus przewalski), and observed that it was very similar to the Robin Hood Cave Horse. Initially, the discovery of the bone was thought to demonstrate the authenticity of the Robin Hood Cave Horse, which was at the time suspected of being a forgery.

== Authenticity ==
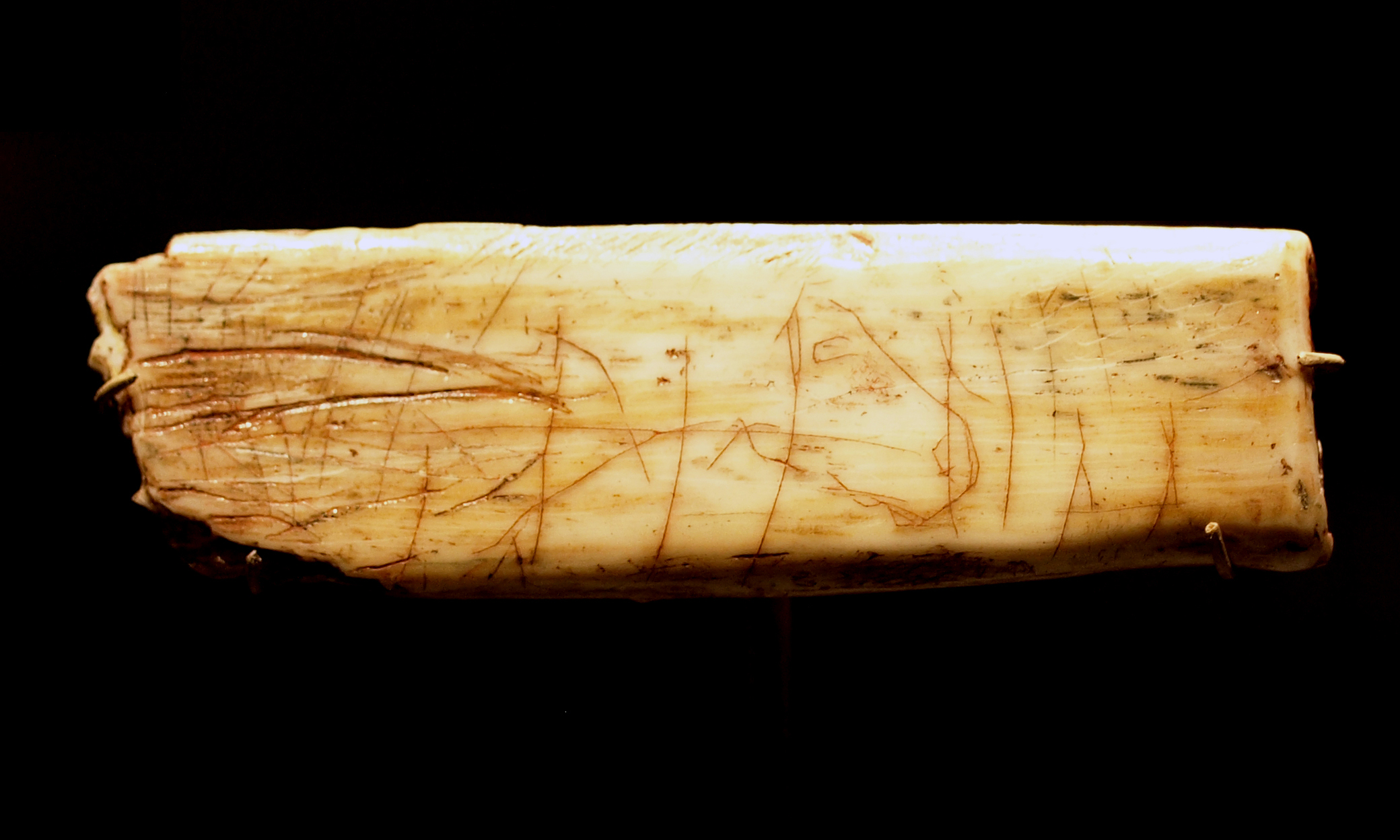
The Robin Hood Cave Horse, believed to have inspired the Sherborne forgery

Woodward's identification was soon challenged by William Sollas, who described the bone as "a forgery perpetrated by some school boys". In 1926, Solas' laboratory assistant Charles Bayzard, who had previously worked at Sherborne School, claimed that he had been told by some of the students there that the bone was a forgery intended to trick Steel. Steel responded that in fact the claim of forgery was a hoax perpetrated against Bayzard. Cortesi, by then a journalist with the New York Times, denied it was a forgery, and the family of Grove, who had been killed during the First World War, reported that he had always maintained that the find was genuine.

In 1957 Kenneth Oakley performed a fluorine test on the bone, the results of which were consistent with an Upper Palaeolithic date for the bone. In 1980, Ann Sieveking, after studying cracks in the bone, concluded that the engraving had been done after the cracks had been produced, and suggested that the Sherborne bone was "not an authentic Palaeolithic engraving".

In 1994, C.B. Stringer and others carried out a radiocarbon dating, which placed the bone in the 14th century AD; they concluded: "it now seems inescapable that the Sherborne engraving is a recent fake." This finding was accepted by J.H.P. Gibb, a housemaster at Sherborne School, and was soon publicized in the national press. As the design on the bone seems to have been inspired by the Robin Hood Cave Horse, the engraving must date to between the publication of that find in 1877 and the boys' presentation of the bone to Steel in 1911. d'Errico et al. suggest that the hoax was most likely carried out by schoolboys at Sherborne.
