= Federmesser culture =

European cultures 14ka to 12.8ka ago

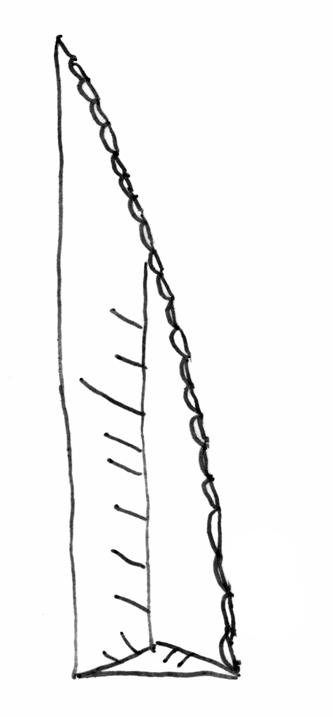
An arrow head from the Federmesser culture

Federmesser group is an archaeological umbrella term including the late Upper Paleolithic to Mesolithic cultures of the Northern European Plain, dating to between 14,000 and 12,800 years ago (the late Magdalenian). It is closely related to the Tjongerian culture, as both have been suggested. It includes the Tjongerian sites at Lochtenrek in the Frisian part of the Netherlands, spanning the area of Belgium, the Netherlands, northern France, northern Germany, southern Denmark, and Poland (Tarnowian and Witowian cultures). It is also closely related to the Creswellian culture to the west and the Azilian to the south. The name is derived from the characteristic small backed flint blades, in German termed Federmesser ("quill knife"). It is succeeded by the Ahrensburg culture after 12,800 BP.

== See also ==
- Late Glacial Maximum – Circa 24,000–16,000 BCE; most recent era when ice sheets were at their greatest extent
- Ahrensburg culture – Late Upper Paleolithic nomadic hunter culture
- Hamburg culture – Late Upper Paleolithic culture
- Magdalenian – Upper Paleolithic and Mesolithic cultures
- Kozarnika – Cave and archaeological site in Bulgaria
- Laacher See – Volcanic crater lake in western Germany
