= Kendrick's Cave =

Cave and archaeological site in the United Kingdom

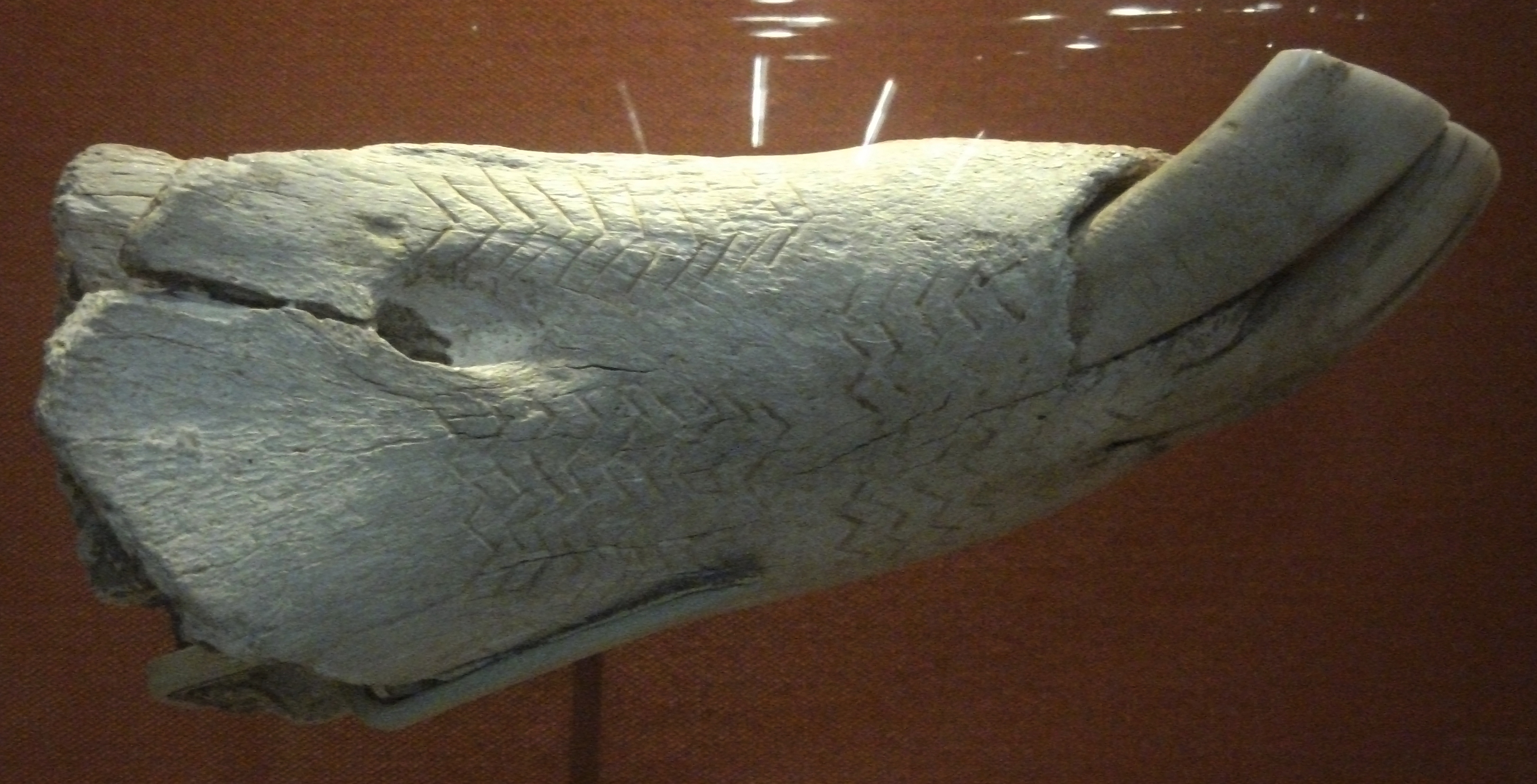
- The Kendrick's Cave Decorated Horse Jaw

- location in Wales Kendrick's Cave (the United Kingdom)
- 53°19′40″N 3°49′58″W
- Type: limestone massif
- Location: on the Great Orme
- Region: Llandudno, Wales

Site notes
- Excavation dates: 1880
- Archaeologists: Thomas Kendrick

Kendrick's Cave on the Great Orme, Llandudno, Wales, was the site of important archaeological finds by Thomas Kendrick in 1880. The site is a small natural cavern on the south of the Great Orme Head, a limestone massif on the seaward side of Llandudno (Ordnance Survey ref SH 78008284).

Kendrick, a lapidary, was clearing a cave in his garden to extend his workshop. In the process he found a decorated horse jaw, flint artefacts, bear teeth with holes for use as beads or pendants and human and animal bones. A project in 2008 involving the British Museum, the Field Club, Llandudno Museum and Archives, Llandudno and Colwyn Bay Historical Society, the National Museum of Wales, and Oxford and Bradford Universities reunited the once dispersed finds from the cave for an exhibition in Llandudno Museum.

== Human diet ==
An analysis of stable isotopes in the human bones found shows that they had a diet high in seafood. The individuals from Kendrick’s Cave show evidence of intensive consumption of marine and freshwater foods, including piscivorous marine mammals such as seals.

== Radiocarbon dating ==
The boundary start date for human activity at the site is 16,410–14,070 calibrated years before the present, with a boundary end date of 13,730–13,140 calibrated years before the present. This estimate is subject to more uncertainty than usual because the proportion of stable carbon derived from a marine diet by these humans is uncertain.

== Burial site ==
The presence of un-modified human bones has been taken to indicate that the cave was a burial site rather than a camp site.

== Ancient DNA ==
DNA from one specimen, Kendricks_074, showed that this person was male and carried haplogroup U5a2. A number of British Mesolithic individuals carry the U5 mitochondrial haplogroup, including one individual from Kent’s Cavern who also carried U5a2. Analysis of the 476,347 single nucleotide polymorphisms recovered from Kendricks_074 shows that he shares most drift with the individuals belonging to the ~14,000–7,000-year-old Villabruna genetic cluster. Eleven Mesolithic individuals from elsewhere in the British Isles, the Western Hunter-Gatherer population, can also be modeled as having entirely Villabruna ancestry, except for Cheddar Man with some 85% Villabruna ancestry.

== A different contemporary culture with genetically-different individuals ==
However, a Palaeolithic individual from Gough’s Cave in SW England, who possibly lived at approximately the same time as Kendricks_074, shares most drift with the individuals belonging to the ~19,000–14,000-year-old Goyet Q2 genetic cluster. De-fleshing marks and secondary treatment of human material at Gough’s Cave (also found at other Magdalenian culture sites such as Brillenhöhle and Hohle Fels in Germany and Maszycka Cave in Poland) has been taken as evidence of cannibalism. This suggests that at least two different human groups, with different genetic affinities and different dietary and cultural behaviours, were present in Britain during the Late Glacial.

== Recent Excavations ==
Kendrick's Upper Cave was excavated by Catherine Rees, George Nash and Kathryn Price in 2016 (Rees & Nash 2017). The excavation was inadvance of a conservation exercise to project the fragile sediments within the cave interior. In advance of installing protective steel grilles across both southerly‑facing entrances, Rees and Nash (2017) led an archaeological evaluation involving two narrow, hand‑excavated trenches and associated post‑holes. Their principal objective was to record the stratigraphic sequence and any surviving deposits before the installation of concrete foundations and metal grilles designed to deter vandalism and unauthorized entry The two trenches (approx. 0.7 m wide each, measuring ~4.4 m and ~1.54 m in length), ran across the future grille locations and were excavated to natural bedrock. All sediments were sieved where health and safety allowed, and detailed drawn, photographic and section records were made. Results showed that all excavated strata derived from the post‑Medieval or 19th-century periods. In particular, Trench 1 revealed occupation layers connected with a former stone-built structure at the cave mouth, including beaten-earth, ash, lime mortar, mortar fragments, coal inclusions and 19th‑century pottery and bone. Trench 2 similarly contained only modern or re‑deposited material, disturbed by roots and possible explosive enlargement of the entrance in the 18th or 19th century

Although no prehistoric deposits or datable artefacts were recovered during the 2016 evaluation, Rees and Nash concluded that archaeological potential remains elsewhere in the cave interior where earlier excavations (Stone & Davies in the 1970s) had yielded Mesolithic/Neolithic remains and rich faunal assemblages. Moreover, their extensive archival research into Thomas Kendrick and the history of the site has revised earlier views: Kendrick was not merely a working tradesman, but an entrepreneurial collector who played a major role in early museum‑style tourism in Llandudno, as well as in the initial recovery of significant Palaeolithic finds.

In summary, the 2016 excavation by Rees & Nash was a carefully planned heritage protection exercise that confirmed modern disturbance in the entrance zones but reinforced the broader value and preserved potential of Kendrick’s Upper Cave as a Scheduled Monument worthy of further scientific investigation.

== See also ==
- Kendrick's Cave Decorated Horse Jaw
- Prehistoric Wales
