= Bromme culture =

Prehistoric culture in northern Europe

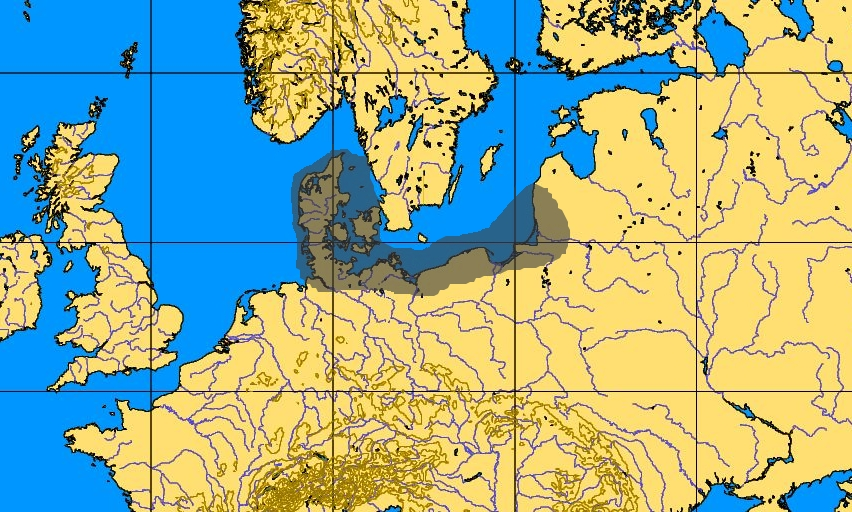
- Geographical range: North Europe
- Period: Late Upper Paleolithic
- Dates: c. 11,600 BC – c. 9800 BC
- Preceded by: Hamburg culture
- Followed by: Ahrensburg culture

The Bromme culture (Danish: Brommekultur) is a late Upper Paleolithic culture dated to c. 11,600 to 9,800 cal BC, which corresponds to the second half of the Allerød Oscillation.

Only a few carbon 14 datings have been made of the Bromme hunters. These dates fall within the second half of the Allerød period. The development of the lithic technology, is unbroken development from the Federmesser hunters in beginning of the Allerød. At the beginning of the Younger Dryas, the transition Ahrensburg culture is smooth.

The culture is named after a settlement at Bromme in western Zealand, and it is known from several settlements in Denmark and Schleswig-Holstein. In Sweden, it is known from the settlement at Segebro, near Malmö, but also from Uppåkra and Vångamossen at lake Finja in northern Scania.

== Characteristics ==
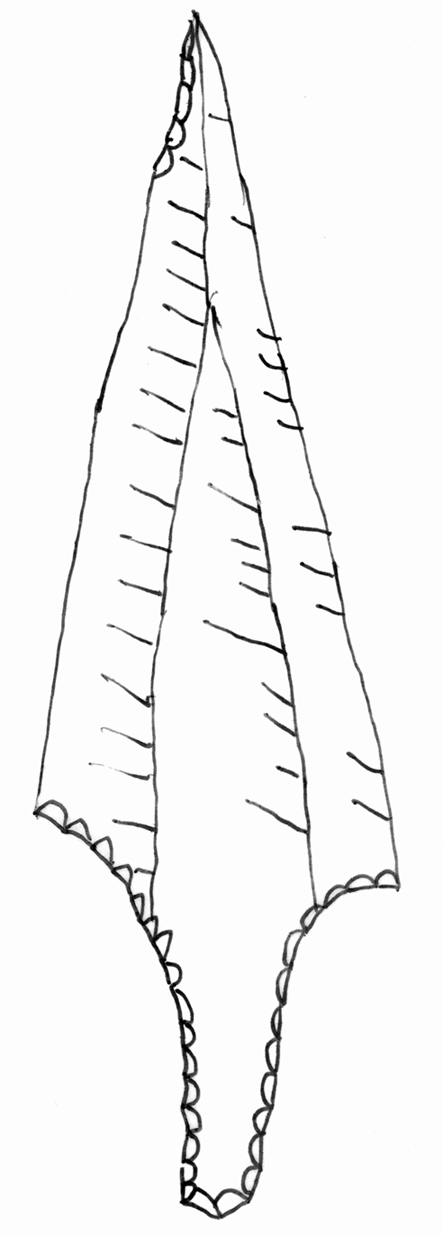
A Bromme culture arrow head

Almost all tools were made of sturdy lithic flakes. The tools were awls (sticklar), scrapers, and tanged points. Stone axes were missing. At this time, reindeer was the most important prey, but the Bromme people also hunted moose/elk, wolverine and beaver. The landscape was a combination of taiga and tundra.

The Bromme hunters lived in varied environment and the settlements they have left us are different. One single settlement is not enough to create a robust picture of Bromme people’s life. Their activities lasted all year round, but we have not discovered settlements from the winter periods—even settlements with favorable conservation conditions provide no information to solve this dilemma. The Bromme hunters lived in a young, fast-developing ecosystem. The environment changed rapidly. No fixed living place in the landscape could provide food all year long. They probably split into small groups to master the seasonal variations in food supplies. Other times of the year, they lived in a larger group at other places. This model of living corresponds to the currents seasonal migrations within Greenland, where many families traveled into the fjords from July-August-September, and then wander inland to campsites by lakes and rivers, which they used year after year.

In the end of summer they lived again by the seacoast with reindeer skins and meat from the hunting parties. Bromme hunters maybe met with other families out on the coast. At these gatherings they hunted together, married, told each others stories and exchange myths. We do not know much of these larger settlements which are now below sea level. Our gathered information of the Bromme hunters is still in its beginning, the same as it has been for several millennia. Underwater archaeology is a possible solution for this problem, once it has been further developed.
