= Ahrensburg =

- Town
- Ahrensburg Palace

- Flag Coat of arms

- Location of Ahrensburg within Stormarn district
- Interactive map of Ahrensburg
- Location within Germany Location within Schleswig-Holstein
- Coordinates: 53°40′29″N 10°14′28″E
- Country: Germany
- State: Schleswig-Holstein
- District: Stormarn
- Subdivisions: 5

Government
  - Mayor: Eckart Boege (SPD)

Area
  - Total: 35.29 km^{2} (13.63 sq mi)
- Elevation: 46 m (151 ft)

Population (2025-12-31)
  - Total: 34,531
  - Density: 978.5/km^{2} (2,534/sq mi)
- Time zone: UTC+01:00 (CET)
  - Summer (DST): UTC+02:00 (CEST)
- Postal codes: 22926
- Dialling codes: 04102
- Vehicle registration: OD
- Website: www.ahrensburg.de

Ahrensburg (German pronunciation: [ˈaːʁənsˌbʊʁk]; Northern Low Saxon: Ahrensborg) is a town in the Stormarn district of the German state of Schleswig-Holstein. It is located northeast of Hamburg and is part of the Hamburg Metropolitan Region. Its population is around 31,000. Schloss Ahrensburg, the town's symbol, is a Renaissance castle dating from 1595.

== Geography ==
Ahrensburg is situated in the Tunneltal, in which Alfred Rust excavated many items dating back to the ice age.

Ahrensburg is situated next to the Autobahn A1 and on the railway route between the Hanseatic cities of Hamburg and Lübeck.

== History ==
=== Early history ===
The Ahrensburger Tunneltal is a place of numerous excavations from the Upper Paleolithic culture. The culture is called Ahrensburg culture by archaeologists.

=== Middle Ages ===
The town dates back to the 13th Century, when the Counts of Schauenburg founded the village of Woldenhorn (which later became the town of Ahrensburg) and the neighbouring villages Ahrensfelde, Meilsdorf and Beimoor. Woldenhorn is first mentioned in the year 1314. The village came into the possession of the Cistercian Reinfeld Abbey in 1327, and Woldenhorn became the seat of the monastery reeve until the middle of the 16th century.

The "Arx Arnsburga", also called Arnesvelde castle, was built around the year 1200. Ruins of the castle are still visible in the Hagen forest to the south of the town. The town coat of arms shows the castle in the upper field. There are records of reeves based in the castle in 1295 and 1304. In 1326, Count John III of Schauenburg had his reeve relocated to Trittau and abandoned the castle.

=== Modern period ===
After the dissolution of the monasteries due to the Reformation, the whole area came into the possession of the king of Denmark. He rewarded his general Daniel Rantzau 1567 with lordship over these villages. His brother and heir Peter Rantzau built the Renaissance Ahrensburg Palace in the form of a water castle, now the symbol of the town, and the castle church around 1595. The construction of almshouses directly by the church was exemplary.

The "Ahrensburg Estate" belonged to the so-called Noble Estates, which possessed a large amount of freedom and self-administration.

The Rantzaus' estate was heavily indebted by the middle of the 18th century and, in 1759, was acquired by the businessman Heinrich Carl von Schimmelmann. Schimmelmann remodelled the castle and village in the baroque style and the current layout of the town reflects these plans.

On 7 June 1867 the estate village Woldenhorn became an independent Prussian country community and renamed itself Ahrensburg after a decision by the community council. It belonged to the "Amt Ahrensburg", from which the "amtsfreie" community once more seceded in 1912.

The construction of the railway between Hamburg and Lübeck in the year 1865 made Ahrensburg a popular destination for outings outside Hamburg and the number of inhabitants increased. By 1910, the population had reached 2,750. The incorporation of various surrounding communities in the year 1928 led to an increase in the town area to about 5 km^{2}.

Building of the settlements "Daheim/Heimgarten" (partially on the territory of the current community of Ammersbek) and "Am Hagen" (originally called "Franz Seldte Settlement") commenced in 1933. The rush of settlers from around Hamburg lead to the creation of the current housing layout.

When Ahrensburg received city rights in 1949, the town had some 17,775 inhabitants – around half of which were refugees from the former eastern German regions.

Erica Keck, who was elected mayor in 1950, became the first female elected mayor in Germany.

The company Hela Gewürzwerk Hermann Laue moved its seat from Hamburg to Ahrensburg between 1989 and 1991.

== Religion ==
Ahrensburg was the seat of the Stormarn Provost of the Lutheran church from 1823 until 1899.

The town had a small Jewish community until the beginning of the 1930s. The Synagogue was burnt down in the Kristallnacht in 1938 during the period of Nazism. The Jewish cemetery (opened in 1822) can still be seen at the edge of town (Ahrensburg-West).

== Politics ==
Since the local election on 26 May 2013, the town council is made up as follows:

Distribution of vote and seats in local council
Party	Overall % of vote	Number of seats in council
CDU	34.5%	11 seats
SPD	27.8%	8 seats
WAB	12.0%	4 seats
GRÜNE	19.3%	6 seats
FDP	6.4%	2 seats

== Twin towns – sister cities ==
Ahrensburg is twinned with:

- Esplugues de Llobregat, Spain
- Feldkirchen in Kärnten, Austria
- Ludwigslust, Germany
- Viljandi, Estonia

== Notable people ==
- Waldemar Bonsels (1880–1952), author of Maya the Bee and her adventures
- Jonathan Meese (born 1970), artist. He grew up in Ahrensburg, attended the Stormarn School and lives in Ahrensburg.

=== Personalities who are associated with the city ===
- Dagmar Berghoff (born 1943), television presenter and actress
- Wolfgang Kieling (1924–1987), actor
- Hellmuth von Mücke (1881–1957), naval officer, politician and writer
- Benedikt Pliquett (born 1984), goalkeeper
- Christian Tümpel (1937–2009), university lecturer, theologian and art historian in Nijmegen
- Daniela Ziegler (born 1948), actress
- Axel Zwingenberger (born 1955), boogie-woogie pianist

=== Honorary citizen ===
- 1965 – Alfred Rust (1900–1983), archeologist, controversial because of his membership in the NS-group Ahnenerbe.
