= Hamburg culture =

Late Upper Paleolithic culture

- Geographical range: Northern Europe
- Period: Late Upper Paleolithic
- Dates: c. 13,000 BC – c. 11,000 BC
- Preceded by: Magdalenian
- Followed by: Federmesser culture Bromme culture

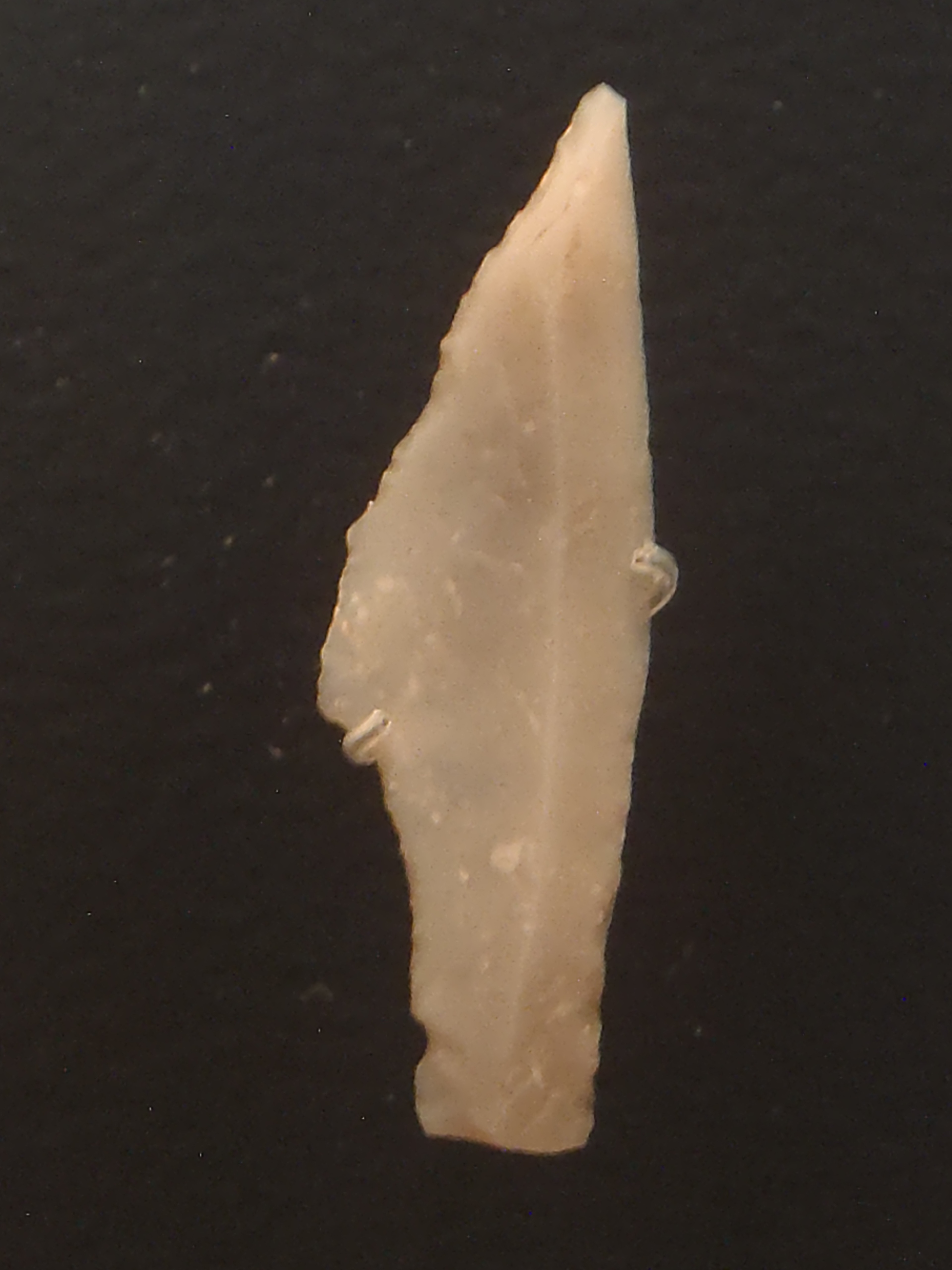
Shouldered point from Bjerlev Hede in central Jutland. Dated around 12,500 BC and considered the oldest hunting tool from Denmark

The Hamburg culture or Hamburgian (15,500-13,100 BP) is a Late Upper Paleolithic hunter-gatherer archaeological culture in northern Europe that existed during the final stages of the Last Glacial Period, beginning during the Bölling interstadial. It forms part of the broader Magdalenian group. Sites are found close to the ice caps of the time. They extend as far north as the Pomeranian ice margin.

The Hamburgian culture is known from sites across the North European plain, including Netherlands, the Jutland Peninsula of Denmark, Northern Germany and Poland. The culture reached as far northwest as Scotland, as evidenced by the stone tools found at the Howburn Farm site in South Lanarkshire, dating to 14,700 to 14,000 years ago. In 1994 remains were also reported from Skane in southern Sweden.

The peoples who produced the Hamburgian culture are generally interpreted as specialist hunters of reindeer, following their migrations across the northern European landscape.^{ix}

The culture is characterized by shouldered points and zinken tools, which were used as chisels when working with antler. In later periods tanged Havelte-type points appear, sometimes described as most of all a northwestern phenomenon. Notwithstanding the spread over a large geographical area in which a homogeneous development is not to be expected, the definition of the Hamburgian as a technological complex of its own has not recently been questioned.

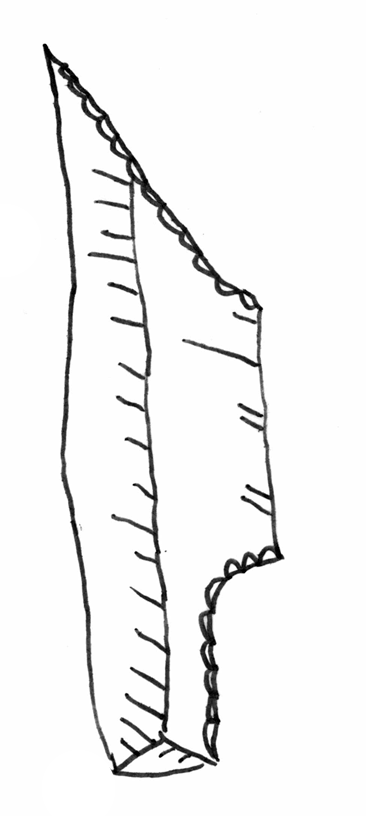
A Hamburg culture shouldered point

The distribution of the finds in the settlements show that the settlements were small and only inhabited by a small group of people. At a few settlements, archaeologists have discovered circles of stones, interpreted as weights for a teepee covering.

== See also ==
- Federmesser culture
- Alfred Rust
- Creswellian
- Ahrensburg culture
- Nationalencyklopedin
