= Pinhole Cave Man =

Upper Paleolithic engraving of a human figure

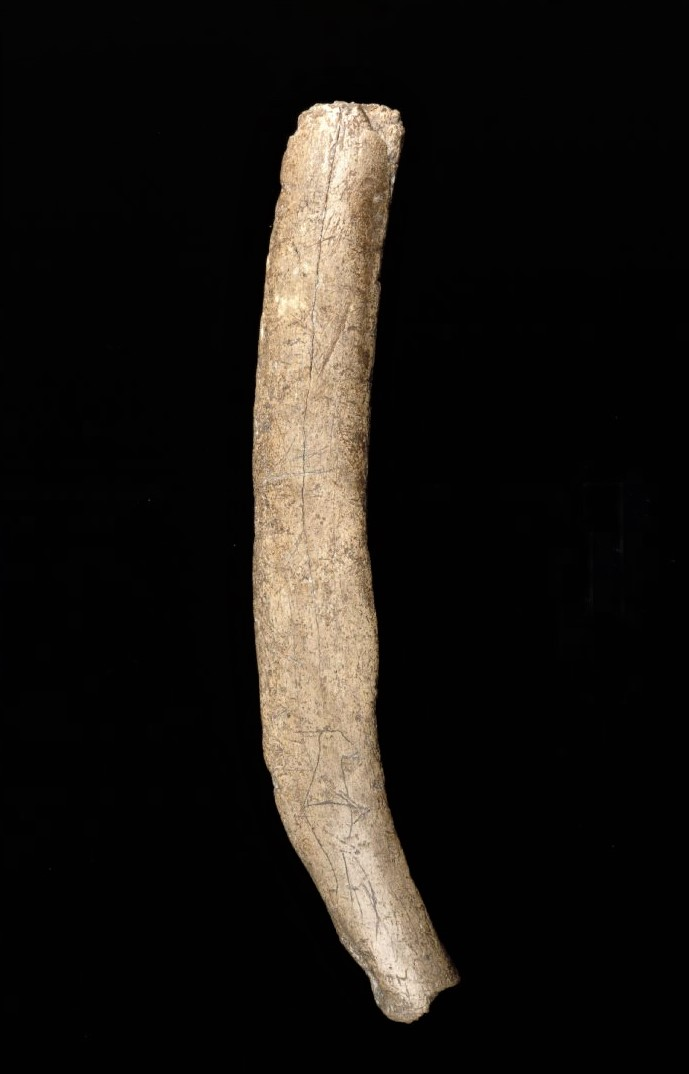
- The rib bone, with the carving at the bottom
- Material: Woolly rhinoceros Bone
- Height: 20.8 cm
- Width: 3 cm
- Created: c. 12,000 years ago
- Discovered: 1926; Creswell Crags, United Kingdom
- Discovered by: A. L. Armstrong
- Present location: British Museum, London

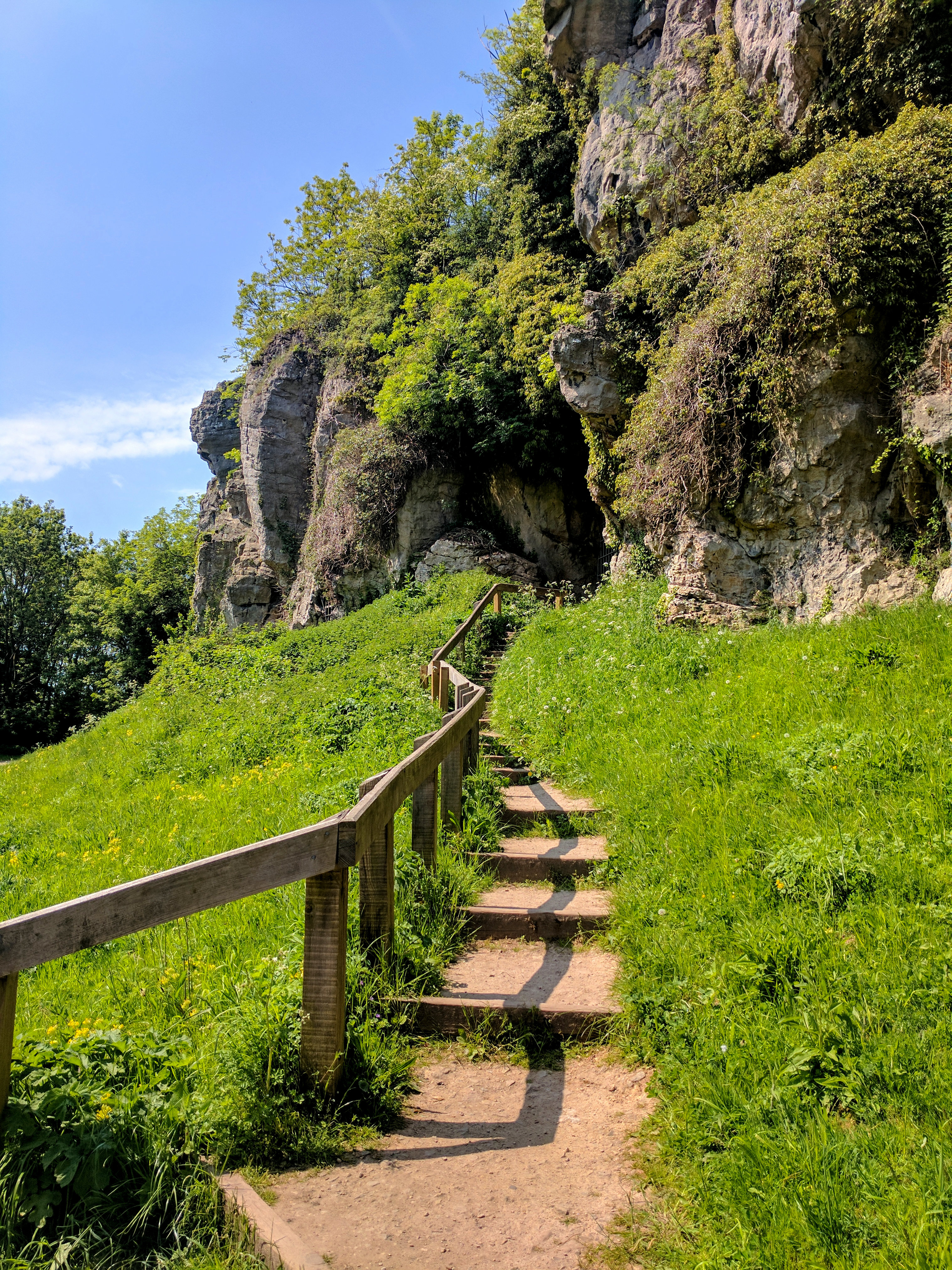
Pin Hole Cave

The Pinhole Cave Man or Pin Hole Cave Man is the common name for an engraving of a human figure on a woolly rhinoceros rib bone dating to the Upper Paleolithic that is now in the British Museum (cataloged as Palart 854). In 1926, a woolly rhinoceros rib (Coelodonta antiquitatis) that was broken at both ends was found in Pin Hole Cave, Creswell Crags, Derbyshire, England.

== Description ==
The bone is dated to the Late Upper Paleolithic, around 12,000 years old. Near one of the broken ends is engraved a male human figure. The drawing, 5 centimetres (2.0 in) tall, faces to the right; the whole bone is 20.8 centimetres (8.2 in) long. It is clearly a man as he has a penis – this may have been an earlier feature of the bone that was enhanced. His thin arm stretches out from his body. His head may be wearing a mask – or he is just drawn with a protruding nose and jaw. He has legs that appear incomplete, a crooked back, and a long engraved line across his upper body. The surface of the bone is scratched all over; on the reverse side of the bone there are two parallel engraved lines.

== Significance ==
This is one of only two pieces of British Upper Paleolithic portable art which shows a figure. The other is the Robin Hood Cave Horse, another image engraved on bone, found in the nearby Robin Hood Cave. It is similar to other pictures of male humans known from France at this period. The lack of clothes and the "cartoon" or "masked" heads are common features which suggest an artistic fashion. Like many human depictions in Palaeolithic art, the figure is crudely drawn; animals are typically better executed. This was not through a lack of ability, as animals are often represented with degrees of realism – see for example the Robin Hood Cave Horse. It may even be part of a more complex carving.

== Discovery ==
Pinhole Cave Man was discovered in 1926 by the archaeologist A. L. Armstrong, who described the engraving as "a masked human figure in the act of dancing a ceremonial dance". The drawing was discovered after a stalagmitic film was removed from the bone's surface near the base of the Later Upper Palaeolithic lithic distribution.

== Exhibitions ==
Pinhole Cave Man has been shown in various places:

- It was lent to the Cresswell Crags Museum from 2009 to 2011.
- It was included in the "Fantastic Creatures" exhibition held from January to April 2012 in the Hong Kong Museum of Art, and from June to September 2011 in the Ulsan Museum in South Korea.
- It was featured in the Ice Age Art exhibition at the Fundación Botín in Santander, Spain, in 2013.

== See also ==
- List of Stone Age art
- Art of the Upper Paleolithic
