= Ahrensburg culture =

Late Upper Paleolithic nomadic hunter culture

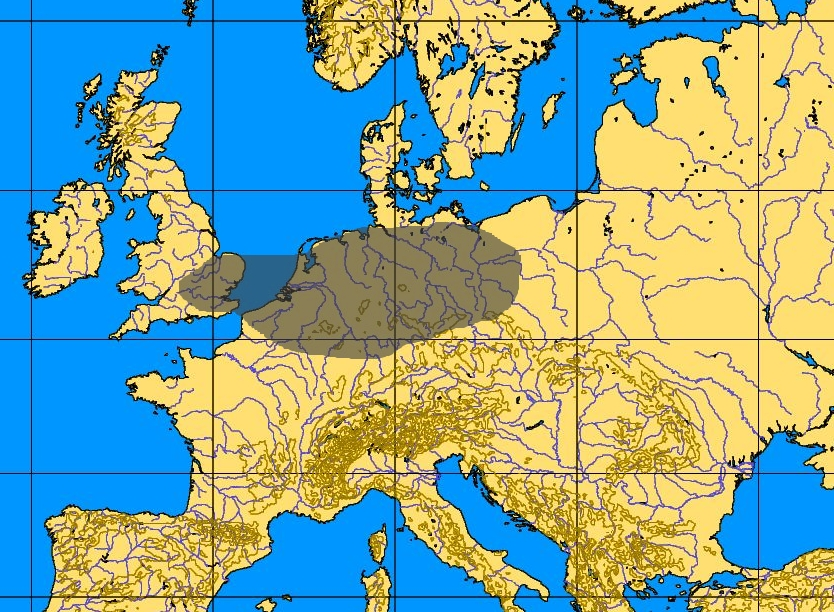
- Map showing distribution of Ahrensburg culture, map is outdated and does not show extent in far north of Britain
- Geographical range: Europe
- Period: Late Upper Palaeolithic
- Dates: c. 12,900–11,700 BP
- Type site: Ahrensburg
- Preceded by: Magdalenian
- Followed by: Maglemosian culture; Swiderian culture

The Ahrensburg culture or Ahrensburgian (c. 12,900 to 11,700 BP) was a late Upper Paleolithic nomadic hunter culture (or technocomplex) in north-central Europe during the Younger Dryas, the last spell of cold at the end of the Weichsel glaciation resulting in deforestation and the formation of a tundra with bushy arctic white birch and rowan. Some skeletons of reindeer have flint arrow tips in them, showing that the culture mastered the use of bows and arrows. The Ahrensburgian was preceded by the Hamburg and Federmesser cultures and superseded by the Maglemosian and Swiderian cultures. Ahrensburgian finds were made in southern and western Scandinavia, the North German plain and western Poland. The Ahrensburgian area also included vast stretches of land now at the bottom of the North and Baltic Sea, since during the Younger Dryas the coastline took a much more northern course than today.

The culture is named after a tunnel valley near the town of Ahrensburg, 25 km (16 mi) northeast of Hamburg in the German state of Schleswig-Holstein, where Ahrensburg find layers were excavated in Meiendorf, Stellmoor and Borneck. While these as well as the majority of other find sites date to the Young Dryas, the Ahrensburgian find layer in Alt Duvenstedt has been dated to the very late Allerød, thus possibly representing an early stage of Ahrensburgian which might have corresponded to the Bromme culture in the north. Artefacts with tanged points are found associated with both the Bromme and the Ahrensburg cultures.

The culture reached as far north as the Isles of Orkney in northern Scotland.

== Origin ==
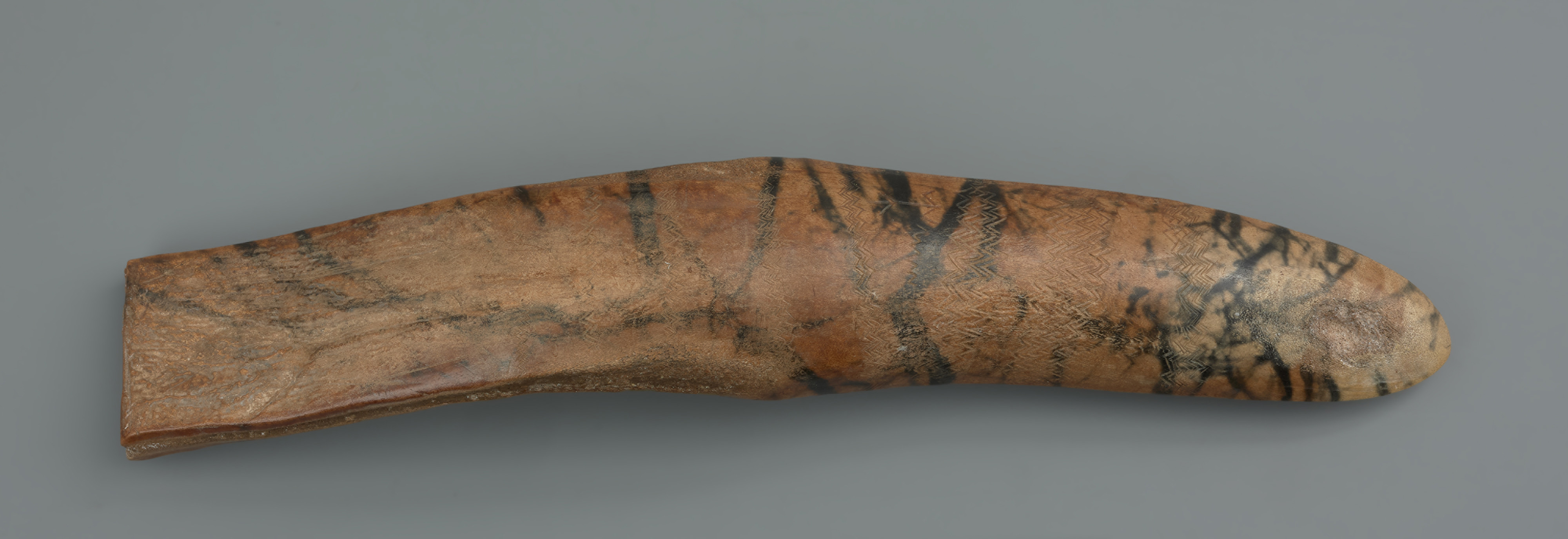
Insignia from Rusinow, radiocarbon dating 10776 to 10641 BCE. National Museum in Szczecin

The Ahrensburg culture belongs to a Late Paleolithic and early Mesolithic (or Epipaleolithic) cultural complex that started with the glacial recession and the subsequent disintegration of Late Palaeolithic cultures between 15,000 and 10,000 BCE. The extinction of mammoth and other megafauna provided an incentive to exploit other forms of subsistence that included maritime resources. Northward migrations coincided with the warm Bølling and Allerød events, but much of northern Eurasia remained inhabited during the Younger Dryas. During the holocene climatic optimum, the increased biomass led to a marked intensification in foraging by all groups, the development of inter-group contacts, and ultimately, the initiation of agriculture.

The different technolithic complexes are chronologically associated with the climatic chronozones. The re-colonisation of Northern Germany is connected to the onset of the late Glacial Interstadial between Weichsel and the Dryas I glaciation, at the beginning of the Meiendorf Interstadial around 12,700 BCE. Palynological results demonstrate a close connection between the prominent temperature rise at the beginning of the Interstadial and the expansion of the hunter-gatherers into the northern Lowlands. The existence of a primary “pioneer phase” in the re-colonisation is contradicted by proof of e.g. an early Central European Magdalenian in Poland. Today it is commonly accepted that the Hamburgian, featured by "Shouldered Point" lithics, is a techno-complex closely related to the Creswellian and rooted in the Magdalenian. Within the Hamburgian techno-complex, a younger dating is found for the Havelte phase, sometimes interpreted as a northwestern phenomenon, perhaps oriented towards the former coastline. The Hamburgian culture existed during the warm Bølling period, the brief Dryas II glaciation (lasting 300 years) and in the early warmer Allerød period.

However, the distribution of the Hamburgian east of the Oder River has been confirmed and Hamburgian culture can also be distinguished in Lithuania. Finds in Jutland indicates the expansion of early Hamburgian hunters and gatherers reached further north than previously expected. The Hamburgian sites with shouldered point lithics reach as far north as the Pomeranian ice margin. The younger Havelte phase has been proven for the area beyond the Pomeranian ice margin and on the Danish Isles after c. 12,300 BCE.

The "Backed Point" lithics of Federmesser culture are usually dated in the Allerød Interstadial. Early Federmesser finds follows shortly or are contemporary to Havelte. The culture lasted approximately 1200 years from 11,900 to 10,700 BCE., and is located in Northern Germany and Poland to south Lithuania. Fish-hooks were discovered in Allerød layers and emphasize the importance of fishing in the Late Palaeolithic. A certain survival of late Upper Palaeolithic traditions similar to contemporary Azilian (France, Spain) becomes apparent, such as the amber elk from Weitsche that can be considered as a link to the Mesolithic, amber animal sculptures.

Bromme culture sites are found in the entire southern and southeastern Baltic, and are dated to the second half of Allerød and the early cold Dryas III period. The "classical" Brommian complex is typified by simple and fast, but uneconomical, flint processing using unipolar (single-platform) cores. A new development noticed in Lithuania introduced both massive and smaller "tanged Points". In Bromme culture this technology is proposed to be an innovation derived from tanged Havelte groups. As such, derivation of Bromme culture and even migration of its representatives from the territories of Denmark and northern Germany have been proposed, although other sources hold early Bromme not to be very well defined in (late Allerød) Northern Germany, where it groups with Federmesser.

Ahrensburg culture is normally associated with the Younger Dryas glacialization and the Pre-boreal period. The traditional view of the Ahrensburg culture being a direct inheritor of the Bromme culture in the late Dryas period is contradicted by new information that the Ahrensburgian techno-complex probably already started before the Younger Dryas, strengthening proposals to a direct derivation from the Havelte stage of the Hamburg culture. Some recent finds, such as the Hintersee 24 site in southern Landkreis Vorpommern-Greifswald, would contribute to the argument of an early Ahrensburgian in northern Germany. Alternatively, flint artefacts of Bromme tanged-point groups is considered to prelude the techno-complex of the Ahrensburg culture and would point to the provenience of Ahrensburg from Bromme culture. As such, the Grensk culture in Bromme territory at the source of the Dnieper River was proposed to be the direct originator of Ahrensburgian culture. However, the exact typological chronology of this culture is still unclear. Though associated with the Bromme complex, Grensk culture has its roots more defined in the local Mammoth Hunters' culture.

Another possibility derives from the observation that on a regional scale, the Hamburgian culture is succeeded geographically as well as chronologically by the Federmesser culture, or Arch-Backed Piece Complex. The existence of a genuine Federmesser occupation in southern Scandinavia is highly controversial, and there is wide, though not unanimous, agreement that some Federmesser types constitute an integral part of the early Brommean artefact inventory. Still, Federmesser types are also often found in close association with Hamburgian assemblages (e.g. at Slotseng and Sølbjerg) and tentative, dating from northern Germany shows some degree of contemporaneity between the late Hamburgian Havelte sites and the Federmesser ones. Therefore, in southern Scandinavia the Federmesser may represent a brief transitory phase between the Hamburgian and the Brommean. This corresponds with the notion that "tanged point cultures" such as "Brommian" or "Bromme-Lyngby" appear to be based on the Magdalenian, during the Allerød and were closely associated with reindeer hunting.

== Stellmoor ==
Stellmoor was a seasonal settlement inhabited primarily during October, and bones from 650 reindeer have been found there. The hunting tool was bow and arrow. From Stellmoor there are also well-preserved arrow shafts of pine intended for the culture's characteristic skaftunge arrowheads of flint. A number of intact reindeer skeletons, with arrowheads in the chest, has been found, and they were probably sacrifices to higher powers. At the settlements, archaeologists have found circles of stone, which probably were the foundations of hide teepees.

== Scandinavia, Hensbacka group ==
The earliest reliable traces of habitation in the northern territories of Norway and western Sweden date to the transition period from the Younger Dryas to the Preboreal. More favourable living conditions, and past experience gained through seasonal rounds, prompted increased maritime resource exploitation in the northern territories. The Hensbacka group on the west coast of Sweden exemplifies the cultural fragmentation process that took place within the Continental Ahrensburgian. Instead of new immigrations at the beginning of the Mesolithic, the discovery of deposited bones and new dating indicate that there was no (significant) break in settlement continuity. New knowledge provides aspects for a further autochthonous development, with a rapid climatic change stimulating a swift cultural change.

== See also ==
- Late Glacial Maximum
- Paleolithic Europe
