= Creswellian culture =

Archaeological culture

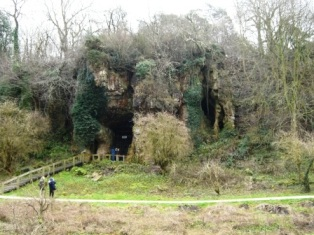
- Geographical range: Great Britain
- Period: Upper Paleolithic
- Dates: between 13,000–11,800 BP
- Type site: Creswell Crags
- Major sites: Gough's Cave, Kents Cavern

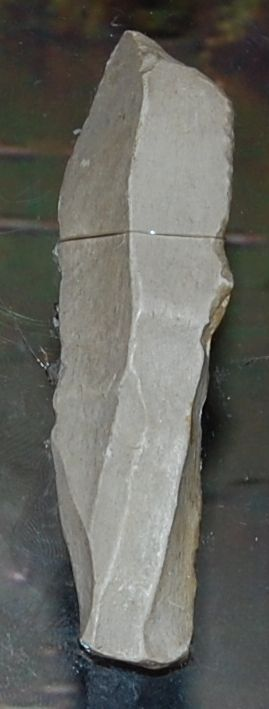
Cast of a Cresswell point, from Creswell Crags, at Derby Museum.

The Creswellian is a British Upper Palaeolithic culture named after the type site of Creswell Crags in Derbyshire by Dorothy Garrod in 1926. It is also known as the British Late Magdalenian. According to Andreas Maier: "In current research, the Creswellian and Hamburgian are considered to be independent but closely related entities which are rooted in the Magdalenian." The Creswellian is dated between 13,000 and 11,800 BP and was followed by the most recent ice age, the Younger Dryas, when Britain was at times unoccupied by humans.

== History ==
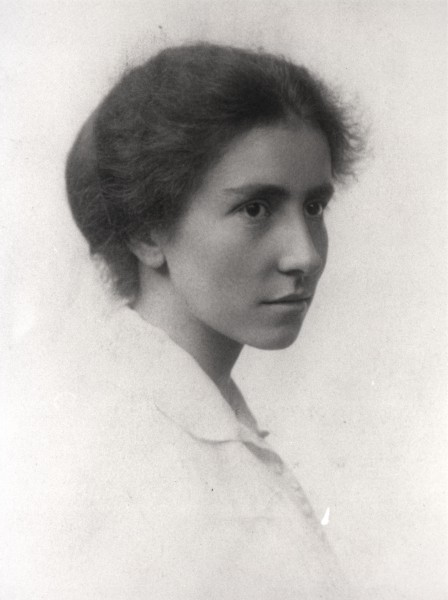
Dorothy Garrod

The term Creswellian appeared for the first time in 1926 in Dorothy Garrod's The Upper Palaeolithic Age in Britain. This was the first academic publication by Dr Garrod who in 1939 became the first woman ever to be elected as a professor at Cambridge. It is also the first monograph about the Upper Paleolithic of Britain at the national level and it remained the only one on the subject for half a century. Garrod suggested that the British variant of the Magdalenian industry is different enough to create a specific name:

"I propose tentatively "Creswellian", since Creswell Crags is the station in which it is found in greatest abundance and variety."

— Dorothy Garrod, The Upper Palaeolithic Age in Britain, Oxford, Clarendon Press, 1926, p. 194.

The definition of Creswellian was refined since then and now refers exclusively, in the British context, to the Late Magdalenian-style industry.

== Description ==
Diagnostic tools used to identify the period include trapezoidal backed blades called Cheddar points, variant forms known as Creswell points, and smaller bladelets. Other tool types include end scrapers made from long, straight blades. A special preparation technique was employed to remove blades from a core through striking in a single direction, leaving a distinct 'spur' on the platform. The tools were made using a soft hammerstone or an antler hammer.

Other finds include Baltic amber, mammoth ivory and animal teeth and bone. These were used to make harpoons, awls, beads and needles. Unusual bevelled ivory rods, known as sagaies have been found at Gough's Cave in Somerset and Kent's Cavern in Devon.

Twenty eight sites producing Cheddar points are known in England and Wales though none have so far been found in Scotland or Ireland, regions which it is thought were not colonised by humans until later. Most sites are caves but there is increasing evidence for open air activity and that preferred sources of flint were exploited and that tools travelled distances of up to 100 miles from their sources. Some of the flint at Gough's Cave came from the Vale of Pewsey in Wiltshire whilst non-local seashells and amber from the North Sea coast also indicate a highly mobile population. This matches evidence from the Magdelanian cultures elsewhere in Europe and may suggest that exchange of goods and the sending out of specialised expeditions seeking raw materials may have been practised. Analysis of debitage at occupation sites suggests that flint nodules were reduced in size at source and the lighter blades carried by Creswellian groups as 'toolkits' in order to reduce the weight carried.

Comparison of flint from Kent's Cavern and Creswell Crags has led some archaeologists to believe that they were made by the same group.

Food species eaten by Creswellian hunters focused on the wild horse (Equus ferus) or the red deer (Cervus elaphus), probably depending on the season, although the Arctic hare, reindeer, mammoth, Saiga antelope, wild cow, brown bear, lynx, Arctic fox and wolf were also exploited.

Highly fragmentary fossil bones were found in Gough's Cave at Cheddar. They had marks that suggested actions of skinning, dismembering, defleshing and marrow extraction. The excavations of 1986-1987 noted that human and animal remains were mixed, with no particular distribution or arrangement of the human bones. They also show the signs of the same treatments as the animal bones. These findings were interpreted in the sense of a nutritional cannibalism. However, slight differences from other sites in skull treatment leave open the possibility of elements of ritual cannibalism.

== See also ==
- Hamburg culture
