= Robin Hood Cave Horse =

Engraved fragment of a horse's head

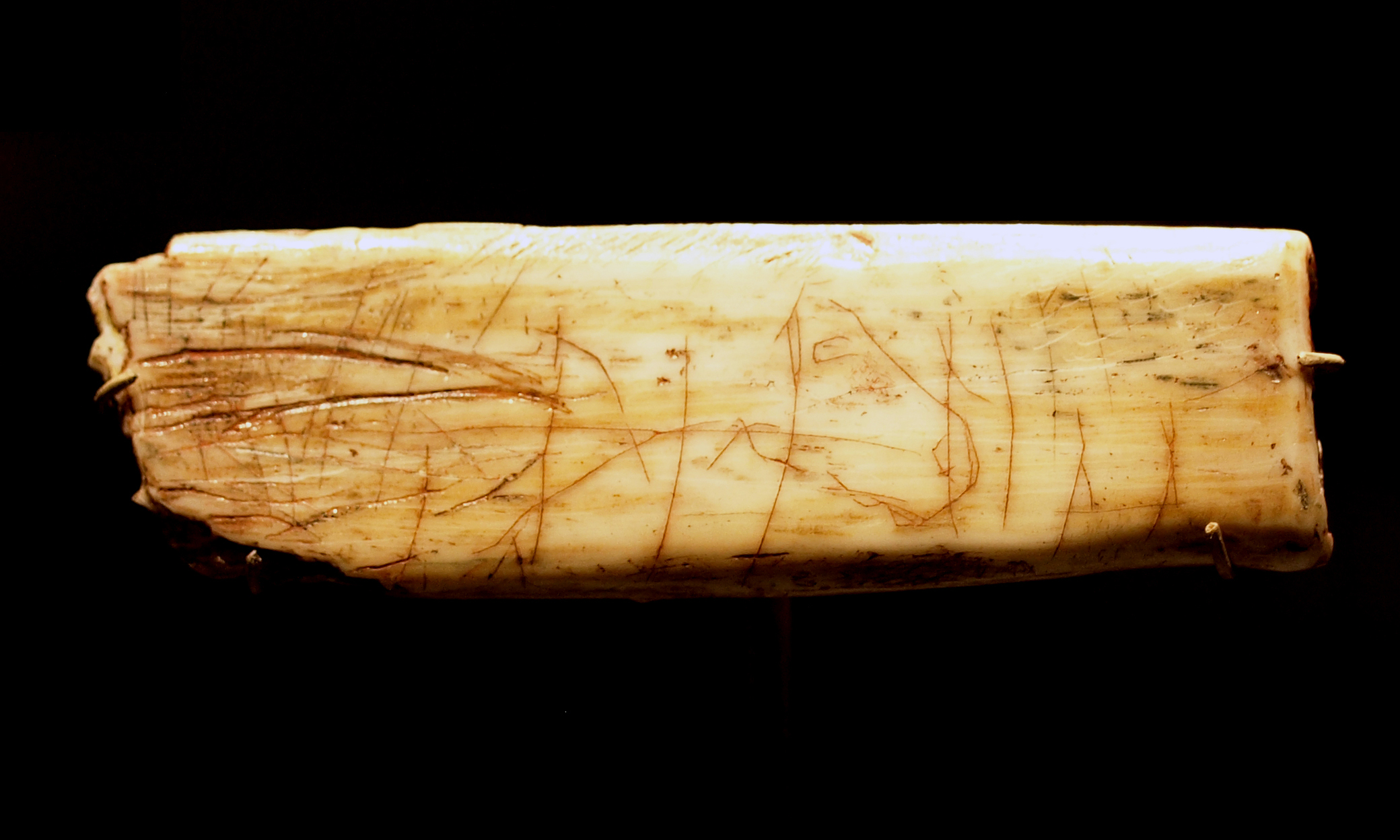
- Engraving of a horse's head on fragment of rib
- Material: Bone
- Size: Length: 7.3 cm
- Created: c. 12,750 years ago
- Discovered: July 1876; England, United Kingdom
- Discovered by: J.M. Mello
- Present location: British Museum, London

Map showing the location of Robin Hood Cave within Derbyshire

The Robin Hood Cave Horse (previously known as the Ochre Horse) is a fragment of a rib engraved with a horse's head, discovered in 1876, in the Robin Hood Cave in Creswell Crags, Derbyshire. It is the only piece of Upper Paleolithic portable art showing an animal to have been found in Britain. It is now in the British Museum, but normally not on display. In 2013, it was displayed in the exhibition at the British Museum Ice Age Art: Arrival of the Modern Mind. A replica of the artifact is displayed at the Creswell Crags Museum.

== Discovery ==
Early excavations of the Robin Hood Cave were carried out by Professor Sir William Boyd Dawkins, who wrote several papers on his findings. In July 1876, the Reverend J.M. Mello discovered the decorated rib at the back of the western chamber in the Robin Hood Cave in Creswell Crags. Dawkins described it as "the head and fore quarters of a horse incised on a smoothed and rounded fragment of rib, cut short off at one end and broken at the other. On the flat side, the head is represented with the nostrils and mouth and neck carefully drawn. A series of fine oblique lines show that the animal was hog-maned. They stop at the bend of the back which is very correctly drawn..." After its discovery and into the 1920s, some suggested that this piece was fraudulent. Although accepted now by most as authentic, some still today suggest that the piece is a genuine Paleolithic work originating from France and fraudulently found or left to be found in the Robin Hood Cave. Similar accusations were made against a Machairodus or sabre-toothed cat tooth found at the same time, and equally singular among the many thousands of animal remains excavated at the site (now acknowledged as authentic). Modern scientific tests do, however, support the local origin of the tooth, which has a similar chemical profile to other local animal remains, and differs from French examples. In the 1920s, three further fragments claimed as showing engraved animals were found, but these are less widely accepted, and might be wholly caused by natural means, such as the action of roots.

There are no real reasons to doubt that it was originally left in Robin Hood's Cave during the Ice Age. In the 1920s, the Pinhole Cave Man, a human figure engraved on a bone, was found nearby, and in 2003, the first British examples of cave art were also found at Creswell Crags.

In 2003, the decorated rib was estimated to be between 12,500 and 13,000 years old. The style of the horse inscription resembles drawings found on French Late Magdalenian sites, where horses are the most popular subject, even though they represent a relatively small proportion of the animal bones found in sites occupied by humans.

=== The sequence of markings ===
The horse motif was the first image to be engraved. Later, vertical lines are overlain across the body and in front of the horse. The overall effect creates an impression of a palisade, fence or even falling spears. If this is the case, we might be seeing a scene in which horses are guided by a wooden structure—maybe for hunting purposes. The deeply scored horizontal lines behind and over the horse were drawn last. They appear frenetic and may constitute a form of erasure. Similar, but more curved, lines are also present on the other side of the rib.

== See also ==
- Prehistoric art
- List of Stone Age art
- Art of the Upper Paleolithic
