= Table of years in the environment =

This is a table of articles covering the environment by year. They discuss topics such as environmental law, conservation, environmentalism and environmental issues.

== 1900s ==
1900 1901 1902 1903 1904 1905 1906 1907 1908 1909
1910 1911 1912 1913 1914 1915 1916 1917 1918 1919
1920 1921 1922 1923 1924 1925 1926 1927 1928 1929
1930 1931 1932 1933 1934 1935 1936 1937 1938 1939
1940 1941 1942 1943 1944 1945 1946 1947 1948 1949
1950 1951 1952 1953 1954 1955 1956 1957 1958 1959
1960 1961 1962 1963 1964 1965 1966 1967 1968 1969
1970 1971 1972 1973 1974 1975 1976 1977 1978 1979
1980 1981 1982 1983 1984 1985 1986 1987 1988 1989
1990 1991 1992 1993 1994 1995 1996 1997 1998 1999

== 2000s ==
2000 2001 2002 2003 2004 2005 2006 2007 2008 2009
2010 2011 2012 2013 2014 2015 2016 2017 2018 2019
2020 2021 2022 2023 2024

== See also ==
- Human impact on the environment
- List of environmental issues
