= Timeline of environmental history =

This timeline lists events in the external environment that have influenced events in human history. This timeline is for use with the article on environmental determinism.

For the history of humanity's influence on the environment, and humanity's perspective on this influence, see timeline of history of environmentalism. See list of years in the environment for the past 150 years on more discrete subjects that relate to environmental law, conservation, environmentalism and environmental issues. See List of periods and events in climate history for a timeline list focused on climate.

== Pre-Holocene (1.5 Ma) ==
The time from roughly 15,000 to 5,000 BCE was a time of transition, and swift and extensive environmental change, as the planet was moving from an Ice age, towards an interstadial (warm period). Sea levels rose dramatically (and are continuing to do so), land that was depressed by glaciers began lifting up again, forests and deserts expanded, and the climate gradually became more modern. In the process of warming up, the planet saw several "cold snaps" and "warm snaps", such as the Older Dryas and the Holocene climatic optimum, as well as heavier precipitation. In addition, the Pleistocene megafauna became extinct due to environmental and evolutionary pressures from the changing climate. This marked the end of the Quaternary extinction event, which was continued into the modern era by humans. The time around 11,700 years ago (9,700 BC) is widely considered to be the end of the old age (Pleistocene, Paleolithic, Stone Age, Wisconsin Ice Age), and the beginning of the modern world as we know it.

Year(s)		Event(s)
Start	End	Event(s)
c. 2,588,000 BC	c. 12,000 BC	Pleistocene era
c. 21,000 BC		Recent evidence indicates that humans processed (gathered) and consumed wild cereal grains as far back as 23,000 years ago.
c. 20,000 BC		Antarctica sees a very rapid and abrupt 6 °C increase in temperatures
c. 19,000 BC		Last Glacial Maximum/sea-level minimum
c. 20,000 BC	c. 12,150 BC	Mesolithic 1 period
c. 17,000 BC	c. 13,000 BC	Oldest Dryas stadial (cool period) during the last Ice age/glaciation in Europe.
c. 13,000 BC		Beginning of the Holocene extinction. Earliest evidence of warfare. Meltwater pulse 1A raises sea level 20 meters. Missoula floods occur.
c. 12,670 BC	c. 12,000 BC	Bølling oscillation interstadial (warm and moist period) between the Oldest Dryas and Older Dryas stadials (cool periods) at the end of the Last glacial period. In places where the Older Dryas was not seen, it is known as the Bølling–Allerød warming.
c.12,340 BC	c.11,140 BC	Cemetery 117: site of the world's first known battle/war.
c.12,500 BC	c.10,800 BC	Natufian culture begins minor agriculture
c. 12,150 BC	c. 11,140 BC	Mesolithic 2 (Natufian culture), some sources have Mesolithic 2 ending at 9500 BC
c. 12,000 BC	c. 11,700 BC	Older Dryas stadial (cool period)
c. 11,700 BC	c. 10,800 BC	Allerød oscillation
c.13,000 BC	c.11,000 BC	Lake Agassiz forms from glacial meltwater. It bursts and floods out through the Mackenzie River into the Arctic Ocean at 11,000 BC, possibly causing the Younger Dryas cold period.
c. 12,000 BC	c. 8,000 BC	Göbekli Tepe, world's earliest known temple-like structure, is created.
c. 10,800 BC		Younger Dryas impact event is proposed to have occurred, causing the onset of the Younger Dryas.
c. 10,800 BC		Younger Dryas cold period begins.
c. 10,000 BC		Preboreal period begins.; World: Sea levels rise abruptly and massive inland flooding occurs due to glacier melt.; Neolithic culture begins, end of most recent glaciation.; First cave drawings of the Mesolithic period are made, with war scenes and religious scenes, beginnings of what became story telling, and metamorphosed into acting.

== 10th millennium BC ==
Year(s)		Event(s)
Start	End	Event(s)
c. 9700 BC		Lake Agassiz reforms from glacial meltwater; Bering Sea: Land bridge from Siberia to North America disappears as sea level rises. See Beringia for further information; North America: Long Island becomes an island, and not just a terminal moraine, when rising waters break through on the western end of the interior lake
c. 9660 to c. 9600 BC		Younger Dryas cold period ends. Pleistocene ends and Holocene begins. Large amounts of previously glaciated land become habitable again. Some sources place the Younger Dryas as stretching from 10,800 BC to 9500 BC. This cool period was possibly caused by a shutdown of the North Atlantic thermohaline circulation (Gulf Stream/Jet Stream), due to flooding from Lake Agassiz as it reformed.
c. 9500 BC		Ancylus Lake, part of the modern-day Baltic Sea, forms.; There is evidence of harvesting, though not necessarily cultivation, of wild grasses in Asia Minor about this time.; End of the pre-Boreal period of European climate change.; Pollen Zone IV Pre-boreal, associated with juniper, willow, birch pollen deposits.; Neolithic era begins in Ancient Near East.; Evidence of the earliest settlement in Jericho; In Antarctica, long-term melting of the Antarctic ice sheets is commencing.; Creosote bush – Larrea tridentata clonal colony, named "King Clone", germinates in the Mojave Desert near the Lucerne Valley in California.
c. 9270 BC		Greenland sees an abrupt and rapid 4 °C rise in temperatures
c. 9000 BC		First stone structures at Jericho built.

== 9th millennium BC ==
Year(s)		Event(s)
Start	End	Event(s)
c. 8500 BC to 7370		Jericho is established as one of the oldest cities in the world sometime between 8500 BC and 7370 BC
c. 8000 BC		Transition from Boreal period to Atlantic period; Last Glacial Period ends; Upper Paleolithic period ends and the Mesolithic period begins; Old Man of the Mountain formed in New Hampshire by retreating glaciers; Antarctica — long-term melting of the Antarctic ice sheets is under way.; Asia — rising sea levels caused by postglacial warming.; North America — The glaciers were receding and by 8000 BC the Wisconsin glaciation had withdrawn completely.; World — Inland flooding due to catastrophic glacier melt takes place in several regions.; Neolithic Revolution, some humans begin to switch from a hunter-gatherer existence to agriculture.

== 8th millennium BC ==
Year(s)		Event(s)
Start	End	Event(s)
c. 7900 BC	c. 7700 BC	Lake Agassiz refills from glacial melt-water around 7900 BC as Glaciers retreat north
c. 7640 BC		Date theorized for impact of Tollmann's hypothetical bolide with Earth and associated global cataclysm.
c. 7500 BC		Mesolithic hunters reach Ireland; 9,500-year-old Norway spruce – Picea abies clonal colony named "Old Tjikko" germinates in Sweden.
7500–7000 BC	3500–3000 BC	Neolithic Subpluvial begins in northern Africa, Mesolithic period ends. Until about 5000 BC, the Sahara desert is substantially wetter than today, comparable to a savannah as part of the African humid period.

== 7th millennium BC ==
Year(s)		Event(s)
Start	End	Event(s)
c. 6600 BC		Jiahu symbols, carved on tortoise shells in Jiahu, Northern China
c. 6500 BC		English Channel formed; Ubaid period begins in Mesopotamia; Chalcolithic (Copper Age) and invention of the wheel occur during this time; Paleolithic period ends and Neolithic period begins in China, continues to 2300 BC
c.6440±25 BC		Kurile volcano on Russia's Kamchatka Peninsula has VEI 7 eruption. It is one of the largest of the Holocene epoch
c. 6400 BC		Lake Agassiz drains into oceans for the final time, leaving Lakes Manitoba, Winnipeg, Winnipegosis, and Lake of the Woods, among others in the region, as its remnants. The draining may have caused the 8.2 kiloyear event, 200 years later
c. 6200 BC		8.2-kiloyear event, a sudden significant cooling episode
c. 6100 BC		The Storegga Slide, causing a megatsunami in the Norwegian Sea
c. 6000 BC		Climatic or Thermal Maximum, the warmest period in the past 125,000 years, with minimal glaciation and highest sea levels. (McEvedy); Rising sea levels form the Torres Strait, separate Australia from New Guinea.; Increasing desiccation of the Sahara. End of the Saharan Pluvial period.; Associated with Pollen Zone VI Atlantic, oak-elm woodlands, warmer and maritime climate. Modern wild fauna plus, increasingly, human introductions, associated with the spread of the Neolithic farming technologies.; Rising sea levels from glacial retreat flood what will become the Irish Sea, separating the island of Ireland from the British Isles and Continental Europe.

== 6th millennium BC ==
Year(s)		Event(s)
Start	End	Event(s)
c. 5600 BC		According to the Black Sea deluge theory, the Black Sea floods with salt water. Some 3000 cubic miles (12,500 km^{3}) of salt water is added, significantly expanding it and transforming it from a fresh-water landlocked lake into a salt water sea.
c. 5500 BC		Beginning of the desertification of north Africa, which ultimately leads to the formation of the Sahara desert from land that was previously savannah, though it remains wetter than today. It's possible this process pushed people in the area into migrating to the region of the Nile in the east, thereby laying the groundwork for the rise of Egyptian civilization.
c. 5300 BC		Vinča symbols (Tărtăria tablets), an example of proto-writing
c. 5000 BC		The Older Peron transgression, a global warm period, begins.; Use of a sail begins. The first known picture is on an Egyptian urn found in Luxor.; Transition from Atlantic period to Subboreal period; Metallurgy appears
5000 BC	700 BC	Megalithic Temples of Malta were created

== 5th millennium BC ==
Year(s)		Event(s)
Start	End	Event(s)
c. 4570 BC	c. 4250 BC	Merimde culture on the Nile River
4400 BC	3500 BC	Amratian/Naqada I culture in Predynastic Egypt
4000 BC	3100 BC	Uruk period begins in Mesopotamia

== 4th millennium BC ==
Year(s)		Event(s)
Start	End	Event(s)
3900 BC		Intense aridification triggered worldwide migration to river valleys, which might have caused changes in human behaviour.; End of the Ubaid period.
3600 BC	2800 BC	Climatic deterioration in Western Europe and the Sahara as the African humid period ends.; In Europe Pollen zone VII Sub Boreal, oak and beech.; Glacial advances of the Piora Oscillation, with lower economic prosperity in areas not able to irrigate in the Middle East.
3500 BC to 3000 BC		The end of the Neolithic Subpluvial era and return of extremely hot and dry conditions in the Sahara Desert, hastened by the 5.9 kiloyear event and the Piora Oscillation.
3500 BC	3200 BC	Gerzeh/Naqada II culture in Egypt
3200 BC	3000 BC	Naqada III and Protodynastic Period of Egypt
3100 BC	2686 BC	Early Dynastic Period of Egypt. The hallmarks of Ancient Egypt (art, architecture, religion) all formed during this period. This is widely assumed to be the time and place of the first writing system, the Egyptian hieroglyphs (date is disputed, some claim they were used as far back as 3200 BC, while others believe they weren't invented until the 28th century BC).
between 3000 BC and 2800 BC		30 km/19 mi-wide Burckle Crater is formed in Indian Ocean from a possible meteor or comet impact.

== 3rd millennium BC ==
Year(s)		Event(s)
Start	End	Event(s)
c. 30th century BC		c. 3000 BC: Stonehenge begins to be built. In its first version, it consists of a circular ditch and bank, with 56 wooden posts. (National Geographic, June 2008).; Sumerian Cuneiform script, considered among the oldest writing systems, is created.
c. 2880 BC		Germination of Prometheus (a bristlecone pine of the species Pinus longaeva), formerly the world's oldest known non-clonal organism.
c. 2832 BC		Germination of Methuselah (a bristlecone pine of the species Pinus longaeva), currently the world's oldest known non-clonal organism.
2807 BC		Suggested date for an asteroid or comet impact occurring between Africa and Antarctica, around the time of a solar eclipse on May 10, based on an analysis of flood stories. Possibly causing the Burckle crater and Fenambosy Chevron.
2650 BC		Sumerian epic of Gilgamesh describes vast tracts of cedar forests in what is now southern Iraq. Gilgamesh defies the gods and cuts down the forest, and in return the gods say they will curse Sumer with fire (or possibly drought). By 2100 BC, soil erosion and salt buildup have devastated agriculture. One Sumerian wrote that the "earth turned white." Civilization moved north to Babylonia and Assyria. Again, deforestation becomes a factor in the rise and subsequent fall of these civilizations.; Some of the first laws protecting the remaining forests decreed in Ur.
c. 2630 BC	1815 BC	Construction of the Egyptian pyramids.
2500 BC		Sahara becomes fully desiccated, and conditions become largely identical to those of today. Desiccation had been proceeding from 7500 to 6000 BC, as a result of the shift in the West African tropical monsoon belt southwards from the Sahel, and intensified by the 5.9 kiloyear event. Subsequent rates of evaporation in the region led to a drying of the Sahara, as shown by the drop in water levels in Lake Chad. Tehenu of the Sahara attempt to enter into Egypt, and there is evidence of a Nile drought in the pyramid of Unas.
2300 BC		Neolithic period ends in China.
2200 BC		Beginning of a severe centennial-scale drought in northern Africa, southwestern Asia and midcontinental North America, which very likely caused the collapse of the Old Kingdom in Egypt as well as the Akkadian Empire in Mesopotamia. This coincides with the transition from the Subboreal period to the subatlantic period.

== 2nd millennium BC ==
Year(s)		Event(s)
Start	End	Event(s)
c. 2000 BC	c. 1000 BC	Continued mountain formation in the Himalayas contributes to the drying up of the Sarasvati River and the desertification of the Thar Region. This contributes to the decline of the Harappan civilization.
1900 BC		The Atra-Hasis Epic describes Babylonian flood, with warnings of the consequences of human overpopulation.
Around 1600 BC		Minoan eruption destroys much of Santorini island, but does not destroy (contrary to what was previously believed) the Minoan civilization on Crete. This may have inspired the legend of Atlantis.
1450 BC		Minoan civilization in the Mediterranean declines, but scholars are divided on the cause. Possibly a volcanic eruption was the source of the catastrophe (see Minoan eruption). On the other hand, gradual deforestation may have led to materials shortages in manufacturing and shipping. Loss of timber and subsequent deterioration of its land was probably a factor in the decline of Minoan power in the late Bronze Age, according to John Perlin in A Forest Journey.
1206 BC	1187 BC	Evidence of major droughts in the Eastern Mediterranean. Hittite and Ugarit records show requests for grain were sent to Egypt, probably during the reign of Pharaoh Merenptah. Carpenter has suggested that droughts of equal severity to those of the 1950s in Greece, would have been sufficient to cause the Late Bronze Age collapse. The cause may have been a temporary diversion of winter storms north of the Pyrenees and Alps. Central Europe experienced generally wetter conditions, while those in the Eastern Mediterranean were substantially drier. There seems to have been a general abandonment of peasant subsistence agriculture in favour of nomadic pastoralism in Central Anatolia, Syria and northern Mesopotamia, Palestine, the Sinai and NW Arabia.

== 1st millennium BC ==
Year(s)		Event(s)
Start	End	Event(s)
800 BC	500 BC	Sub-Atlantic period in Western Europe.; Pollen Zone VIII, sub-Atlantic. End of last Sea Level rise.; Spread of "Celtic fields", Iron Age A, and Haalstadt Celts.; Increased prosperity in Europe and the Middle East.
800 BC	200 BC	Axial Age, a revolution in thinking that we know as Philosophy, begins in China, India, and Europe, with people such as Socrates, Plato, Homer, Laozi, Confucius, among others, alive at this time.
753 BC		Ancient Rome begins, with the founding of Rome. This marks the beginning of Classical antiquity.
771-221 BC		The Eastern Zhou period of China is characterized by the formation of larger and more powerful political systems, whose ability to transform their environment is much greater than earlier states. They establish parks to protect wildlife for hunting purposes.
508 BC		Democracy created in Athens, Ancient Greece
356 BC	323 BC	Alexander the Great
269 BC	232 BC	Reign of Ashoka the Great, and the beginning of propagation of Buddhism
221 BC		The Qin dynasty founds China's first empire period of China, conquers large areas of the East Asian mainland, and soon collapses, but is soon rebuilt by the Han dynasty, whose population and environmental impact is similar to that of the Roman Empire. Qin established some of the world's first environmental protection laws.
c. 225 BC		The Sub-Atlantic period began about 225 BC (estimated on the basis of radiocarbon dating) and has been characterized by increased rainfall, cooler and more humid climates, and the dominance of beech forests. The fauna of the Sub-Atlantic is essentially modern although severely depleted by human activities. The Sub-Atlantic is correlated with pollen zone IX; sea levels have been generally regressive during this time interval, though North America is an exception.
c. 200 BC		Sri Lanka becomes the first country in the world to have a nature reserve when King Devanampiya Tissa of Anuradhapura established a wildlife sanctuary.

== 1st millennium AD ==
=== 1st century ===
Year(s)		Event(s)
Start	End	Event(s)
79 AD		Mount Vesuvius erupts, burying Pompeii and Herculaneum

=== 2nd century ===
Year(s)		Event(s)
Start	End	Event(s)
114	117	Rome reaches its greatest expanse in terms of territory, stretching from the Sahara desert, to England and Belgium, along the Danube River and Black Sea to Mesopotamia and modern-day Kuwait.
186		Hatepe eruption in New Zealand turns the skies red over Rome and China.

=== 3rd century ===
Year(s)		Event(s)
Start	End	Event(s)
235	284	Crisis of the Third Century affects Ancient Rome

=== 4th century ===
Year(s)		Event(s)
Start	End	Event(s)
c. 300		Migration Period begins. This leads in a couple of centuries to the fall of Rome.
301		San Marino founded, claims to be the world's oldest republic

=== 5th century ===
Year(s)		Event(s)
Start	End	Event(s)
c. 400	c. 800	Migration Period
c. 450		Malaria epidemic in Italy.
476		Fall of Rome, end of the Western Roman Empire

=== 6th century ===
Year(s)		Event(s)
Start	End	Event(s)
535	536	535–536: global climate abnormalities affecting several civilizations.

=== 7th century ===
Year(s)		Event(s)
Start	End	Event(s)
600		Mount Edziza volcanic complex in British Columbia, Canada erupts
650		Muslim conquests of the Middle East, North Africa, and Europe

=== 8th century ===
Year(s)		Event(s)
Start	End	Event(s)
Dates unknown		Classical Maya civilization begins to decline; Beowulf saga is probably written in Europe sometime in this century
750		Muslim Caliphate is moved to Baghdad, ushering in its golden age as a cultural crossroads
774	775	Unusually-high levels of Carbon 14 are found in tree rings throughout Japan, most likely from a gamma-ray burst, previously thought to be from cosmic rays or abnormally strong solar flares
772	804	Charlemagne invades what is now northwestern Germany, battling the Saxons for more than thirty years and finally crushing their rebellion, incorporating Old Saxony into Francia and the Christian world.

=== 9th century ===
Year(s)		Event(s)
Start	End	Event(s)
c. 850		Severe drought exacerbated by soil erosion causes collapse of Central American city states and the end of the Classic Maya civilization.
874		According to Landnámabók, the settlement of Iceland begins.

=== 10th century ===
Year(s)		Event(s)
Start	End	Event(s)
930		Althing, oldest parliamentary institution in the world that is still in existence, is founded
980s		Greenland settled by Viking colonists from Iceland

== 2nd millennium ==
=== 11th century ===
Year(s)		Event(s)
Start	End	Event(s)
985	1080	Norse Colony at L'Anse aux Meadows
1006		SN 1006 supernova, brightest apparent magnitude stellar event in recorded history (−7.5 visual magnitude)
1054		SN 1054 supernova, created the Crab Nebula
1099		The Hodh Ech Chargui and Hodh El Gharbi Regions of southern Mauritania become desert.

=== 12th century ===
Year(s)		Event(s)
Start	End	Event(s)
1104		Venetian Arsenal in Venice, Italy is founded, employed 16,000 at its peak for the mass production of sailing ships in large assembly lines, hundreds of years before the Industrial Revolution
1150		Renaissance of the 12th century in Europe, blast furnace for the smelting of cast iron is imported from China
1185		First record of windmills in Europe
Dates unknown		Nan Madol is constructed on Pohnpei in Micronesia

=== 13th century ===
Year(s)		Event(s)
Start	End	Event(s)
c. 1250	c. 1850	Start of the Little Ice Age, a stadial period within our interglacial warm period
1257		Catastrophic eruption of Samalas in Indonesia, with climate effects comparable to that of the 1815 Tambora eruption. This contributed to the cooling seen in the Little Ice Age.
end of the 13th century		beginning of the Renaissance era in Italy, gradually spreads throughout Europe.

=== 14th century ===
Year(s)		Event(s)
Start	End	Event(s)
1315	1317	Great Famine of 1315–1317 (Europe)
1347	1350s	Bubonic plague decimates Europe, creating the first attempts to enforce public health and quarantine laws.
1350		Western Settlement in Greenland abandoned, possibly due to the deteriorating climate caused by the onset of the Little Ice Age

=== 15th century ===
Year(s)		Event(s)
Start	End	Event(s)
1408		Last known recording (a wedding) of Norse settlers in Greenland
1453		1452/1453 mystery eruption contributes to fall of Constantinople.
1492		Christopher Columbus lands in Caribbean islands, starting the Columbian exchange, causing the Aztec Empire and Inca Empire to fall to the Spanish in the next century, as well as bringing various species of animals and plants across the Atlantic Ocean.

=== 16th century ===
Year(s)		Event(s)
Start	End	Event(s)
1585	1587	Roanoke Colony, now in North Carolina
End of the 16th century		End of the Renaissance era, gradual transition towards the Baroque, Romantic, Enlightenment, and Modern eras.

=== 17th century ===
Year(s)		Event(s)
Start	End	Event(s)
1600		Huaynaputina erupts in South America. The explosion had effects on climate around the Northern Hemisphere (Southern hemispheric records are less complete), where 1601 was the coldest year in six centuries, leading to a famine in Russia; see Russian famine of 1601–1603.
1610		It has been posited that 1610 marks the beginning of the Anthropocene, or the 'Age of Man', marking a fundamental change in the relationship between humans and the Earth system.

=== 18th century ===
Year(s)		Event(s)
Start	End	Event(s)
c. 1750		Beginning of Industrial Revolution, which eventually turns to use of coal and other fossil fuels to drive steam engines and other devices. Anthropogenic carbon pollution presumably increases.
1755		Great Lisbon earthquake occurred in the Kingdom of Portugal on Saturday, 1 November, the holiday of All Saints' Day, at around 09:40 local time; subsequent fires and a tsunami almost totally destroyed Lisbon and adjoining areas, accentuating political tensions in the kingdom and profoundly disrupting Portugal's colonial ambitions.
1770		Failure of the monsoons in the late 1760s contribute to the Bengal famine of 1770 where 10 million people die. This forces a change in tax policy in the British Empire, which was a cause of the American War of Independence.
1783		The volcano Laki erupts, emitting sufficient sulfur dioxide gas and sulphate particles to kill a majority of Iceland's livestock and cause an unusually cold winter in Europe and Western Asia.
1789	1793	A recent study of El Niño patterns suggests that the French Revolution was caused in part by the poor crop yields of 1788–89 in Europe, resulting from an unusually strong El-Niño effect between 1789 and 1793.
1798		Thomas Robert Malthus publishes An Essay on the Principle of Population, thus beginning Malthusian economics.

=== 19th century ===
Year(s)		Event(s)
Start	End	Event(s)
1804		World population reaches 1 billion.
1815		Eruption of Mt. Tambora in what is now Indonesia, largest in the 2nd millennium AD. Leads to the...
1816		... "Year Without a Summer" across North America and Europe.
1845	1857	Unusually wet weather in Northern Europe causes crop failures. The worst crop affected was the potato on which both Ireland (the Great Famine) and Scotland (the Highland Potato Famine) were heavily dependent. Elsewhere in Europe, the food shortages lead to civil unrest and the revolutions of 1848. Counting the Irish diaspora and the forty-eighters, millions of Europeans emigrate to North America, South America, and Australia.
1859		John Tyndall discovers that some gases block infrared radiation. He suggests that changes in the concentration of these gases could bring climate change.
1883		Eruption of Krakatoa in Indonesia. The sound of the explosion is heard as far as Australia and China, the altered air waves causes strange colours on the sky and the volcanic gases reduce global temperatures during the following years. A disputed but vivid sunset was captured in Edvard Munch's The Scream.
1896		Svante Arrhenius mathematically quantifies the effects of carbon dioxide on climate change related to the Industrial Revolution and the burning of fossil fuels.

=== 20th century ===
Year(s)		Event(s)
Start	End	Event(s)
1900		The 1900 Galveston hurricane hits Galveston, Texas and reverses the city's previously rapid growth.
1906		San Francisco earthquake causes collapse of insurance markets and the Panic of 1907.
1908		Tunguska event decimates a remote part of Siberia.
1914	1918	World War I, which involves heavy bombardment, explosions, and poison gas warfare.
1918		Spanish flu kills between 20 and 50 million people worldwide shortly after World War I.
1927		World population reached 2 billion.
1932	1937	Exceptional precipitation absence in northern hemisphere exacerbated by human activities causes the Dust Bowl drought of the US plains and the Soviet famine of 1932–1933 (harsh economic damage in US and widespread death in USSR).
1939	1945	World War II, with heavy bombardment, genocide, and explosions. Towards the end of the war, nuclear warfare occurs for the first and only time when Hiroshima and Nagasaki are bombed.
post-1945		Nuclear tests are performed by the United States, Soviet Union, India, Pakistan, China, North Korea, the United Kingdom, and France. Above-ground detonations continue until the Partial Test Ban Treaty is signed in 1963, causing fallout and spreading radiation around the explosion sites.
1955		Gilbert Plass submits his seminal article "The Carbon Dioxide Theory of Climatic Change".
1957		Sputnik is launched, becomes first man-made object to orbit the Earth, and begins the Space Race between the United States and the Soviet Union, culminating with the first man in space in 1961, and the Moon landing, humanity's first ventures to the Moon in 1969.
1960		World population reached 3 billion.
1963		The Clean Air Act is passed in the United States, with subsequent amendments in 1970, 1977 and 1990.
1974		World population reached 4 billion.
1970s	2010s	Deindustrialization occurs in the Midwest and then much of the United States, as manufacturing industries (and their pollution) move to China and other Asian countries.
1980		Mount St. Helens erupts explosively in Washington state.
1984		Bhopal disaster.
1986		Chernobyl meltdown and explosion, contaminating surrounding area, including Pripyat.
1987		World population reached 5 billion.
1987		The Montreal Protocol comes into effect, phasing out chlorofluorocarbons (CFCs) and other substances responsible for ozone depletion.
1992		The Earth Summit is held in Rio, attended by 192 nations.
1997		The Kyoto Protocol is signed, committing nations to reducing greenhouse gas emissions.
1999		World population reached 6 billion.

== 3rd millennium ==
=== 21st century ===
Year(s)		Event(s)
Start	End	Event(s)
2004		The Sumatra–Andaman Earthquake causes large tsunamis in the Indian Ocean, killing nearly a quarter of a million people.
2005		Hurricanes Katrina, Rita, and Wilma cause widespread destruction and environmental harm to coastal communities in the US Gulf Coast region, especially the New Orleans area.
2008		Cyclone Nargis makes landfall over Myanmar, causing widespread destruction and killing over 130,000 people.
2010		Earthquake in Haiti destroyed vital infrastructure and kills over 100,000 people.; Earthquake in Chile of a magnitude of 8.8, caused damage on many cities.; The eruption of the Eyjafjallajökull volcano affected activities in Europe and across the world.; Deepwater Horizon oil spill in Gulf of Mexico causes millions of barrels of oil to pollute the gulf.
2011		Tsunami in Japan An earthquake and later a tsunami hit the country’s main island of Honshu on March 11, 2011. After this disaster, the nuclear power plant in Fukushima, Japan releases significant levels of radiation due to damage from the earthquake.; World human population reached the 7 billion.; Tornadoes of 2011, a series of destructive and record-breaking tornado outbreaks and tornado outbreak sequences strike the heartland of the United States, killing hundreds of people, injuring scores more, and causing billions of dollars in damages, particularly in St. Louis and Joplin in Missouri, Tuscaloosa and Birmingham in Alabama, and elsewhere.
2012		Hurricane Sandy devastates the eastern third of North America, from Florida to Quebec, and from Michigan to Nova Scotia, as the largest Atlantic basin hurricane in history.
2013		Typhoon Haiyan (Yolanda) ravages the central Philippines, with explosive strengthening and a record-setting wind-speed at landfall of 314 kilometres per hour (195 mph).; A multivortex tornado touches down in El Reno, Oklahoma and grows to a record-setting width of 4.2 kilometres (2.6 mi).; Minamata Convention on Mercury is signed, committing nations to reducing mercury poisoning.
2015		A global climate change pact is agreed at the COP 21 summit, committing all countries to reduce carbon emissions for the first time.
2016		150 nations meeting at the UNEP summit in Rwanda agree to phase out hydrofluorocarbons (HFCs), as an extension to the Montreal Protocol.

== See also ==
- Behavioral modernity
- Chronology of the universe
- Civilization
- Cradle of civilization
- Culture
- History of life
- Formation and evolution of the Solar System
- Geologic time scale
- Global temperature record
- History of Earth
- Human evolution
- Human evolutionary genetics
- Human history
- Kardashev scale
- List of years in the environment
- Paleoclimatology
- Paleotempestology
- Recorded history
- Snowball Earth
- Technological singularity
- Timeline of human evolution
- Timeline of the evolutionary history of life
- World history
