= Outline of environmental history =

This page has a list of articles related to environmental history, the study of human interaction with the natural world over time.

== Articles titled "History of ..." ==
- History of agriculture in India (from ancient times)
- History of agriculture in the People's Republic of China (from ancient times)
- History of agriculture in the United States
- History of the anti-nuclear movement (from before 1945)
- History of the bicycle (from 1817 with archetype)
- History of biotechnology
- History of climate change science (from the early 19th century)
- History of coal mining (from ancient times)
- History of coal mining in the United States
- History of cycling
- History of cycling in New Zealand (from the 1860s)
- History of the diesel car (from 1933)
- History of electric power transmission (from the late 19th century)
- History of electricity sector in Canada (from the late 19th century)
- History of electricity supply in Queensland
- History of the electric vehicle (from the mid-19th century)
- History of ethanol fuel in Brazil (from the 1970s)
- History of flooding in Canada
- History of Hydro-Québec (from 1944)
- History of the jet engine
- History of manufactured gas (from the 18th century)
- History of nanotechnology (from the 1980s)
- History of nuclear weapons (from the 1930s)
- History of numerical weather prediction (from 1950)
- History of the oil shale industry (from the mid-19th century)
- History of the oil tanker (since 1863?)
- History of organic farming (from ancient times)
- History of passive solar building design
- History of the petroleum industry in Canada (from the late 1950s?)
- History of the petroleum industry in Canada (frontier exploration and development) (from 1920)
- History of the petroleum industry in Canada (natural gas) (most significantly from 1980)
- History of the petroleum industry in Canada (natural gas liquids) (from 1914)
- History of the petroleum industry in Canada (oil sands and heavy oil) (from 1719)
- History of the petroleum industry in the United States (from the early 19th century)
- History of plug-in hybrids (most significantly from 2002)
- History of rail transport (from nearly 500 years ago) (See also: Category:History of rail transport.)
- History of rapid transit (from 1863)
- History of road transport (from ancient times)
- History of Statoil (1972–2007)
- History of the steam engine (from the first century CE)
- History of steam road vehicles (experimentally from the 17th century)
- History of sustainability (from the earliest civilizations)
- History of the Venezuelan oil industry (from before European colonization)
- History of waste management (from ancient times)
- History of water filters (from ancient times)
- History of water fluoridation (from c. 1901, with research on cause Colorado brown stain)
- History of water supply and sanitation (from ancient times)
- History of wildfire suppression in the United States
- Environmental history of Latin America

== Timelines ==
- Timeline of alcohol fuel
- Timeline of the Deepwater Horizon oil spill
- Timeline of the Deepwater Horizon oil spill (May 2010)
- Timeline of the Deepwater Horizon oil spill (June 2010)
- Timeline of the Deepwater Horizon oil spill (July 2010)
- Timeline of the Deepwater Horizon oil spill (August 2010)
- Timeline of environmental events
- Timeline of environmental history
- Timeline of the Fukushima Daiichi nuclear disaster
- Timeline of the Fukushima Daini nuclear accidents
- Timeline of genetically modified organisms
- Timeline of history of environmentalism
- Timeline of major U.S. environmental and occupational health regulation
- Timeline of Minamata disease
- Timeline of the New Zealand environment
- Timeline of nuclear weapons development
- Timeline of relief efforts after the 2010 Chile earthquake
- Timeline of relief efforts after the 2010 Haiti earthquake

== Environmental history books ==
Title	Theme(s) and subtheme(s)	Author(s)	Year(s)
1491: New Revelations of the Americas Before Columbus		Charles C. Mann	2005
Changes in the Land: Indians, Colonists, and the Ecology of New England	Land and water: hunting and fishing	William Cronon	1983
Ecological Imperialism: The Biological Expansion of Europe, 900-1900	Introduced species: epidemics	Alfred Crosby	1986
The Evolution of the Conservation Movement, 1850-1920 (collection of books and other publications)	Conservation movement		
Famine 1975! America's Decision: Who Will Survive?	Overpopulation: food security	William and Paul Paddock	1967
The Ghost Map: The Story of London's Most Terrifying Epidemic - and How it Changed Science, Cities and the Modern World	Pollution: water pollution	Steven Berlin Johnson	2006
The Improving State of the World: Why We're Living Longer, Healthier, More Comfortable Lives On a Cleaner Planet	Environmental skepticism	Indur M. Goklany	2007
A Short History of Progress	Environmental history	Ronald Wright	2004
Struggle for the Land: Native North American Resistance to Genocide, Ecocide and Colonization	Various themes	Ward Churchill	1993, 1999, 2002

== Miscellaneous topics ==
- Category:Environment by year
- Growth of photovoltaics
- Instrumental temperature record
- List of years in the environment
- Table of years in the environment
- Temperature record of the past 1000 years

== Gallery ==
Oil consumption per day by region from 1980 to 2006

Biodiversity hotspots

== See also ==
- Category:Environment by year
- Lists of environmental topics
