= Timeline of the New Zealand environment =

This is a timeline of environmental history of New Zealand. It includes notable events affecting the natural environment of New Zealand as a result of human activity.

== Pre 1700s ==
14th century

- Arrival of Māori who brought with them the kiore rat.

16th century

- Final extinction of all eleven species of moa.

1642

- Tasman is first European to reach New Zealand.

== 1760s ==
1769

- New Zealand mapped by James Cook, and the Norway rat believed to have arrived in New Zealand aboard his ship, the Endeavour. Feral pigs – called "Captain Cookers" in New Zealand – possibly arrived with Cook in the course of visits to New Zealand (1773–1774) during his second voyage (1772–1775).

== 1790s ==
- European sealers and whalers arrive.

== 1800s ==
- Gorse introduced as hedging plant.
- Rabbits introduced.
- Sheep and cattle introduced.

== 1830s ==
1837

- Australian brush-tailed possum introduced.

== 1840s ==
1840

- Treaty of Waitangi

== 1860s ==
- Ship rat spreads throughout North Island.

1860

- Australian magpie introduced.

1861

- The Protection of Certain Animals Act passed - legislated that: "No Deer of any kind, Hare, Swan, Partridge, English Plover, Rook, Starling, Thrush or Blackbird" could be shot for the rest of the decade.

1864

- Wild Birds Protection Act - legislated that: "No Wild Duck, Paradise Duck, or Pigeon indigenous in the colony shall be hunted, taken, or killed except during the months of April, May, June, and July in any year".

1867

- Trout and Salmon Protection Act passed - made provision for "the preservation and propagation of Salmon and Trout in this Colony".

== 1870s ==
- Ship rat spreads throughout the South Island.
- Rook introduced from Europe

1870

- Hedgehogs, which devour large quantities of insects, are introduced.

1875

- Seal hunting restricted to a short annual season.

1876

- Rabbit Nuisance Act passed.

1879

- Ferrets introduced to control rabbits even after warnings were made of their effects on bird life.

== 1880s ==
1882

- Small Birds Nuisance Act passed.

1884

- One hundred stoat and weasel were caught in Lincolnshire, England, for shipment to New Zealand. The passage is expected to take 45 days and 1,500 live pigeons were also shipped for their consumption.

1885

- Stoats and weasels are liberated as a misguided attempt to control rabbits.

1887

- 23 September — Te Heuheu Tūkino IV gifts Ruapehu, Tongariro and Ngauruhoe to people of New Zealand.

== 1890s ==
1890

- An area of land, that will become the Trounson Kauri Park, is set aside by the Government.

1893

- Rainbow trout successfully introduced by the Auckland Acclimatisation Society.

1894

- Protection of fur seal population due to declining numbers.
- Lyall's wren becomes extinct, killed by cats.
- Tongariro National Park Act passed.

1897

- Kapiti Island is designated as an island reserve.

== 1900s ==
1900

- Egmont National Park established

1901

- Noxious Weeds Act passed

1903

- Scenery Preservation Act passed.

1904

- Scenery Preservation Commission appointed.

1907

- Tongariro National Park is formally gazetted.
- Last known huia sighted and then shot.

1907

- Human population reached one million.

== 1920s ==
1921

- Herbert Guthrie-Smiths Tutira: The Story of a New Zealand Sheep Station is published.
- Animals Protection and Game Act 1921–22

1923

- The Royal Forest and Bird Protection Society of New Zealand is formed.

1929

- Attempt made to protect bush in an area near what will be the Abel Tasman National Park.

== 1930s ==
1936

- Protection removed from mustelids.

== 1940s ==
1941

- Soil and Rivers Control Act was enforced. This was the first piece of coordinated environmental legislation in New Zealand.

1942

- Abel Tasman National Park established.

1946

- Possums no longer protected.

1948

- Takahē rediscovered in the Murchison Mountains in Fiordland.

1949

- Forests Act 1949 is passed.

== 1950s ==
1952

- Waipoua Forest Sanctuary formed.
- Fiordland National Park established.
- Population reaches two million.

1953

- Aoraki / Mount Cook National Park established.
- The Wildlife Act 1953 is passed.

1954

- Trials on usage on 1080 in New Zealand begin.
- 28 July — Te Urewera National Park gazetted. Additions made later.

== 1960s ==
1964

- Mount Aspiring National Park established.

1965

- Hydro dam proposed at Tuapeka River mouth is opposed by local residents.

1967

- Rudd is illegally introduced into New Zealand.

1967

- Water and Soil Conservation Act was enforced.
- Save Manapouri Campaign gains nationwide headlines.

== 1970s ==
1970

- 264,907 New Zealanders, almost 10 percent of the population, sign the Save Manapouri petition.
- Environmental Defence Society is formed.

1971

- CoEnCo is formed.
- The Marine Reserves Act 1971 is passed.

1972

- The Values Party is formed at Victoria University of Wellington.
- The Clean Air Act 1972 is passed.

1973

- Government decides to put South Island beech forests up for tender for chipping.
- Population reaches three million.

1974

- Greenpeace New Zealand is formed.
- The Save Aramoana Campaign is formed.
- Project Jonah is established.

1975

- 4 July — The Maruia Declaration, calling for protection of native forests, is signed. It attracted 341,160 signatures by the time it was presented to Parliament in 1977.
- An import ban on all whale products is announced by government.
- Friends of the Earth New Zealand is formed.
- The Treaty of Waitangi Act 1975 is passed in Government and the Waitangi Tribunal is established.

1976

- CoEnCo renamed as ECO.
- NZ rejoins the International Whaling Commission.

1977

- The "Territorial Sea and Exclusive Economic Zone Act" is passed.
- Queen Elizabeth II National Trust Act set up to encourage the protection of private land from development.
- 20 July — The Maruia Declaration with a 341,159 signature petition is presented to Government.
- 23 December — The Reserves Act is passed (includes provision for Wilderness Areas).
- 23 December — The Wild Animal Control Act is passed.

1978

- Tree top protest in Pureora Forest to halt the logging of native forest.
- 1 April — The Reserves Act 1977 comes into force.

1979

- Five black robins left but saved from extinction by Don Merton and team.
- The Litter Act 1979 is passed.
- 1 January — Marine Mammals Protection Act came into force.

== 1980s ==
1980

- Protests over a proposed aluminium smelter at Aramoana (See also: Independent State of Aramoana)
- Clyde Dam protests.
- Native Forest Restoration Trust established to purchase and protect native forests.
- The National Parks Act 1980 was enforced.

1982

- The approval of the water rights necessary for the high Clyde Dam is overturned on appeal in Gilmore v. National Water and Soil Conservation Authority (1982).
- The National Government enacts the Clutha Development (Clyde Dam Empowering) Act 1982 to overturn the High Court case refusing water rights.

1983

- Friends of the Earth NZ joins Friends of the Earth International.
- 1 October — Fisheries Act comes into force (establishes a fishing quota system).

1984

- New Zealand's nuclear-free zone declared by the Labour Government.

1985

- 10 July — Bombing of Rainbow Warrior by French secret agents.

1986

- The Environment Act is passed, establishing the Ministry for the Environment (MfE) and the Parliamentary Commissioner for the Environment (PCE).
- Quota Management System (QMS) introduced to conserve fish stocks within the Exclusive Economic Zone.
- Kea are given full protection.
- West Coast Accord signed for the protection of portions of native forest from logging.

1987

- Paparoa National Park established.
- 1 January — Environment Act comes into force.
- 1 April — Conservation Act 1987 comes into force (establishes the Department of Conservation and Fish & Game).

1989

- The Tasman Accord is signed between Tasman Forestry Ltd environmental groups and the Government.
- 1 June — Trade in Endangered Species Act 1989 comes into force (CITES).

== 1990s ==
1990

- Banning of wood chip exports.
- Creation of Tongariro National Park World Heritage site.
- Creation of Te Wahipounamu World Heritage site.
- Green Party of Aotearoa New Zealand is formed.
- Establishment of the Forest Heritage Fund (later renamed "Nature Heritage Fund").
- Ministry for the Environment Green Ribbon Award established.

1991

- Protests over the mining of ilmenite on the West Coast.
- Resource Management Act 1991 passed into law.
- Crown Minerals Act 1991 is passed.

1993

- Biosecurity Act 1993 is passed.
- Forests Act 1949 is amended.
- Forest and Bird develop the Forest Friendly Awards to classify invasive garden plants.
- The Government launches the Environment 2010 Strategy
- 9 June — New Zealand Post issues a set of stamps on conservation.
- 1 July — Te Ture Whenua Māori Act 1993 comes into effect.
- 15 November — A West Coast environmentalist claims his house was the target of arson due to his anti-mining stance.

1994

- Rats eradicated from Kapiti Island.
- Resource consent given to mine sand in Mangawhai Harbour.
- Basel Convention comes into force in New Zealand.

1996

- Environment Court, formerly called the Planning Tribunal, is constituted by the Resource Management Amendment Act 1996 with upgraded powers.
- Kahurangi National Park gazetted.
- Fisheries Act 1996 is passed (though parts of it come into force only spasmodically over the next few years).
- Hazardous Substances and New Organisms Act 1996 is passed.
- Ozone Protection Layer Act 1996 is passed.

1997

- Native Forest Action commences lobbying to save West Coast forests.
- Wild Greens group formed.
- Zerowaste Trust established.

1998

- Creation of New Zealand Sub-Antarctic Islands World Heritage site.
- 22 May — New Zealand signs the Kyoto Protocol.

1999

- Labour/Alliance coalition Government gains power paving the way for protection of West Coast native forests.
- DOC publishes "Karst Management Guidelines" to assist with cave and karst protection.
- Karori Wildlife Sanctuary construction completed, limited public access available.
- Proposed West Coast ilmenite mine project is abandoned. (The Press — 6 February 1999)

== 2000s ==
2000

- The Energy Efficiency and Conservation Act 2000 is passed, establishing the Energy Efficiency and Conservation Authority as a Crown agent.
- A gondola is proposed from Lake Wakatipu area to the Milford Sound road.
- Varroa bee mite discovered in New Zealand.
- West Coast loop road through conservation land is promoted by group of South Island mayors.
- 15 June — Biotech lobby group Life Sciences Network web site goes live.
- Forests (West Coast Accord) Act 2000 passed

2001

- Moratorium on new marine farming applications, initially for two years.
- Forest restoration on the Kāpiti Coast.
- National Pest Plant Accord is developed to prevent the spread of invasive plants.
- German tourist fined for smuggling a gecko.
- 30 May — Government announces transfer of all Timberlands managed forests to DOC.
- 18 August — Macraes mine extension turned down by Sandra Lee-Vercoe, the Minister of Conservation.
- 21 October — The Waigani Convention came into force.

2002

- Rakiura National Park established.
- Labour led government abolishes logging of native trees on public land.
- Waste Strategy released by the Ministry for the Environment.
- Ferrets no longer able to be legally bred, sold or distributed.
- The Climate Change Response Act 2002 is passed.
- 25 January — New Zealand Environment magazine launched.
- 22 December — New Zealand ratifies the Kyoto Protocol.

2003

- Govt^{3}, a sustainability programme for government department, is established
- YHA NZ started a Young Environmentalist programme.
- The WWF Living Planet report ranks New Zealand as having the fourteenth largest ecological footprint per capita.
- 24 April — New Zealand population is estimated to top 4,000,000.
- 26 May — Campbell Island declared rat free.
- 26 May — Ministry of Agriculture and Forestry, Ministry for the Environment, and Fonterra sign the Dairying and Clean Streams Accord.
- June — Consultation is sought on an Agricultural emissions research levy (commonly called the "flatulence tax" or "fart tax").
- 5 September — New Zealand Environment magazine discontinued.
- 11 September — Environment Minister addresses pollution in the Rotorua lakes.
- 31 October — Businessman jailed for clearing native bush (this has set a legal precedent)

2004

- Rock snot, (Didymosphenia geminata), an invasive freshwater weed is found in some New Zealand rivers.
- Group to proceed with the Milford Gondola.
- Nitrates an increasing problem in Canterbury's groundwater.
- Monorail proposed to shorten tourist trip between Queenstown and Milford Sound.
- Pike River mine given go-ahead despite protests by environmental groups.
- Kaikōura Green Globe Conference declaration.
- Rats successfully eradicated from Raoul Island.
- 20 January — Two Czech visitors fined for plant smuggling.
- 8 February — 13,000-litre diesel spill in Milford Sound.
- 12 March — Mount Burnett mining road application turned down.
- 25 March — Cypress mine, an open cast coal mine, is proposed for the West Coast.
- 29 March — Meridian Energy proposed Project Aqua is cancelled.
- 10 May — Kaikōura Island protected.
- 17 May — Montréal Protocol comes into force.
- 18 October — More invasive plants discovered in Auckland
- 3 November — PCE releases report on the environmental effects of farming.
- 31 December — Moratorium on marine farms lifted after the passing of the Aquaculture Reform Bill.

2005

- Non-toxic shot only is to be used for waterfowl hunting from the 2005 season onwards.
- The position of Minister of Climate Change is established.
- 14 March — Application lodged for mining black sands off the west coast of the North Island.
- 1 April — The Income Tax Act 2004, which makes it easier to claim environmental expenditure, comes into force.
- 22 April — Landsborough Station purchased.
- 1 May — Pesticides blamed for killing native frogs.
- 26 May — Environment Court rules in favour of Solid Energy for the Cypress mine.
- 1 July — Molesworth Station transferred from LINZ to DOC.
- 28 July — First criminal conviction for killing a fur seal is handed down.
- September — Rock snot found in the Buller River.
- November — Last remaining use of reusable glass milk bottles will end.
- 18 November — Cavers protest about potential damage to Te Tahi Cave when used for adventure racing.
- 20 December — A tunnel is proposed to link Queenstown and the Milford Sound road.

2006

- 26 January — New Zealand is rated top in the Pilot 2006 Environmental Performance Index.
- February — The fishing industry proposes limits on bottom trawling.
- 17 March — Proposal to build a gondola between Queenstown and the Milford Sound road is postponed.
- 8 April — A pipe bomb is used to blow up a conservationist's letterbox.
- 9–12 April — Geckos are stolen from a Christchurch zoo but later recovered.
- 12 May — An application for proposed aerial walkway in the Hokitika Scenic Reserve is rejected by Department of Conservation.
- 24 October — The WWF Living Planet report ranks New Zealand with the ninth largest per capita ecological footprint.
- 30 November — Great white sharks will be protected within New Zealand's EEZ from April 2007.

2007

- January — DOC considers that almost half of the native plants and animals are threatened.
- 20 February — Wa$ted!, a programme investigating household sustainability, begins a two-season run on New Zealand television.
- 23 March — Prime Minister Helen Clark puts forward aspirations for New Zealand to be the first sustainable country.
- 4 April — The OECD releases a report on the performance of the New Zealand Government.
- 4 April — Bottom trawling is prohibited in selected areas.
- 30 May — Government gives $9.88 million to clean up the Tui mine tailings site.
- 30 November — The orange roughy fishery is closed to allow stocks of the fish to recover.
- 13 December — The proposed tunnel linking Queenstown and Milford Sound is blocked by the New Zealand Conservation Authority.

2008

- The Waste Minimisation Act 2008 is passed.
- 31 January — Environment New Zealand 2007, a State of the Environment report, is released.
- 10 February — The Green Party leak Chapter 13 of Environment New Zealand 2007 State of the environment report, which slates the dairy industry and the high level of consumption in New Zealand.
- 20 February — A survey shows that 53% of New Zealanders' are deeply concerned that we are not doing enough to protect the environment.
- 4 March — The World Economic Forum Travel and Tourism Competitiveness Report rates New Zealand at 24 out of 130 countries for environmental sustainability.
- April — Greenhouse gas emissions in New Zealand are 26% higher than 1990 levels, the required level for the Kyoto Protocol.
- 10 September — The Climate Change Response (Emissions Trading) Amendment Act 2008 is passed, establishing the New Zealand Emissions Trading Scheme.

2009

- Govt^{3} is discontinued.
- 3 February — The National-led Government announces reforms to the Resource Management Act

== 2010s ==
2010

2011

- June — The Parliamentary Commissioner for the Environment recommends against a moratorium on 1080, citing the ensuing damage to native forests and animals if such a ban went ahead.
- 1 July — the Environmental Protection Authority begins operation.
- 5 October — the container ship Rena runs aground on Astrolabe Reef, 12 nautical miles off Tauranga, resulting in New Zealand's worst oil spill.

2012

- Concerns about hydraulic fracturing in New Zealand (fracking) are highlighted in the media.

2013

- Department of Conservation publishes findings raising concerns about the impact of introduced trout on native fish.

2014

- West Coast Wind-blown Timber (Conservation Lands) Act 2014 passed

=== 2019 ===
- The Climate Change Response (Zero Carbon) Amendment Act 2019 is passed.
- The Climate Change Commission is established.

=== 2020 ===
- The government declares a climate emergency.

== See also ==
- Environment of New Zealand
- Timeline of environmental events
- Timeline of New Zealand history
