= 1966 in the environment =

This is a list of notable events relating to the environment in 1966. They relate to environmental law, conservation, environmentalism and environmental issues.

== Events ==
- A number of protected areas were established in 1966, including the Allagash Wilderness Waterway in Maine, Éamon de Valera Forest in Israel, and Gamla Varberg nature reserve in Sweden.
- Hari Singh reconstitutes the Indian Forest Service.

=== November ===
- An unusually strong Sirocco caused the 1966 flood of the Arno and 1966 Venice flood on November 4, destroying many priceless buildings and works of art.

== See also ==
- Human impact on the environment
- List of environmental issues
- List of years in the environment
