= Timeline of history of environmentalism =

This timeline of the history of environmentalism is a listing of events that have shaped humanity's perspective on the environment. This timeline includes human induced disasters, environmentalists that have had a positive influence, and environmental legislation.

For a list of geological and climatological events that have shaped human history see Timeline of environmental history and List of years in the environment.

== 7th century B.C. ==
- The Book of Deuteronomy in the Torah states: "When you besiege a city for a long time, making war against it in order to take it, you shall not destroy its trees by wielding an axe against them. You may eat from them, but you shall not cut them down. Are the trees in the field human, that they should be besieged by you?"
- The Book of Deuteronomy also emphasizes that individuals must take responsibility for their own waste to mitigate adverse human impacts on the environment: "Designate a place outside the camp where you can go to relieve yourself. As part of your equipment have something to dig with, and when you relieve yourself, dig a hole and cover up your excrement."

== 7th century ==
- 630s — Caliph Abu Bakr commanded his army: "Bring no harm to the trees, nor burn them with fire, especially those which are fruitful. Slay not any of the enemy's flock, save for your food."
- 676 — Cuthbert enacts protection legislation for birds on the Farne Islands (Northumberland, England).

== 9th–12th centuries ==
- Arabic medical treatises dealing with environmentalism or environmental science, including pollution, were written by Al-Kindi, Qusta ibn Luqa, Al-Razi, Ibn al-Jazzar, al-Tamimi, al-Masihi, Avicenna, Ali ibn Ridwan, Ibn Jumayʿ, Isaac Israeli ben Solomon, Abd-el-latif, Ibn al-Quff, and Ibn al-Nafis. Their works covered a number of subjects related to pollution, such as air pollution, water pollution, soil contamination, municipal solid waste mishandling, and environmental impact assessments of certain localities.
- Cordoba, Al-Andalus, had waste containers and waste disposal facilities for litter collection.
- William the Conqueror, a great lover of hunting, established the system of forest law. This operated outside the common law, and served to protect game animals and their forest habitat from destruction. In the year of his death, 1087, a poem, "The Rime of King William", inserted in the Peterborough Chronicle, expresses English indignation at the forest laws.

== 14th century ==
- 1306 — King Edward I of England bans the burning of sea-coal by proclamation in London, after its smoke had become a problem.
- 1366 — In september, the city of Paris forces butchers to dispose of animal wastes outside the city.
- 1388 — The English Parliament passes an act forbidding the throwing of filth and garbage into ditches, rivers and waters. The city of Cambridge also passes the first urban sanitary laws in England.

== 15th century ==
- 1420 to 1427, Madeira islands: destruction of the laurisilva forest, or the woods which once clothed the whole island when the Portuguese settlers decided to clear the land for farming by setting most of the island on fire. It is said that the fire burned for 7 years.

== 17th century ==
- 1609 — Hugo Grotius publishes Mare Liberum (The Free Sea) with arguments for the new principle that the sea was international territory free to use for seafaring trade. The ensuing debate had the British Empire and France claim sovereignty over territorial waters to the distance within which cannon range could effectively protect it, the three mile (5 km) limit.
- 1640 — Isaac Walton writes The Compleat Angler about fishing and conservation.
- 1664 — John Evelyn publishes one of the first texts on forestry, Sylva, or A Discourse of Forest-Trees and the Propagation of Timber in His Majesty's Dominions, in response to deforestation in England.
- 1690 — Colonial Governor William Penn requires Pennsylvania settlers to preserve 1-acre (4,000 m^{2}) of trees for every five acres cleared.

— The last Mauritius dodo dies. The extinction was due to hunting, but also by the pigs, rats, dogs and cats brought to the island by settlers. Later the species has become an icon of animal extinction.

== 18th century ==
- 1710 — Jonathan Swift notes the contents of London's gutters: "sweepings from butchers' stalls, dung, guts and blood, drowned puppies, stinking sprats, all drenched in mud..."
- 1730 — In India, hundreds of Bishnois of Khejarli are killed trying to protect trees from Maharaja Abhai Singh of Marwar, who needed wood to fuel the lime kilns for cement to build his palace. This event has been considered as the origins of the 20th century Chipko movement.
- 1739 — Benjamin Franklin and neighbors petition Pennsylvania Assembly to stop waste dumping and remove tanneries from Philadelphia's commercial district. Foul smell, lower property values, disease and interference with fire fighting are cited. The industries complain that their rights are being violated, but Franklin argues for "public rights." Franklin and the environmentalists win a symbolic battle but the dumping goes on.
- 1748 — Jared Eliot, clergyman and physician, writes Essays on Field Husbandry in New England promoting soil conservation.
- 1762 to 1769 — Philadelphia committee led by Benjamin Franklin attempts to regulate waste disposal and water pollution.
- 1773 — William Bartram, (1739–1823). American naturalist sets out on a five-year journey through the US Southeast to describe wildlife and wilderness from Florida to the Mississippi. His book, Travels, is published in 1791 and becomes one of the early literary classics of the new United States of America.
- 1798 – Thomas Robert Malthus publishes An Essay on the Principle of Population, an evolutionary social theory of population dynamics as it had acted steadily throughout all previous history.

== 19th century ==
- 1820 — World human population reached 1 billion.
- 1828 — Carl Sprengel formulates the Law of the Minimum stating that economic growth is limited not by the total of resources available, but by the scarcest resource.
- 1828/1830- Thomas Carlyle introduces the use of the term "environment" in its modern sense.
- 1836 — Ralph Waldo Emerson publishes Nature.
- 1845 — First use of the term "carrying capacity" in a report by the US Secretary of State to the Senate.
- 1848 — Henry David Thoreau publishes Civil Disobedience.
- 1849 — Establishment of the U.S. Department of Interior.
- 1851 — Henry David Thoreau delivers an address to the Concord (Massachusetts) Lyceum declaring that "in Wildness is the preservation of the World." In 1863, this address is published posthumously as the essay "Walking" in Thoreau's Excursions.
- 1854 — Henry David Thoreau publishes Walden; or, Life in the Woods.
- 1859 — Publication of second edition of William Elliott's Carolina Sports by Land and Water (first published in 1846), an early example of the hunter-as-conservationist, a phenomenon which became increasingly important for conservationism.
- 1860 — Henry David Thoreau delivers an address to the Middlesex (Massachusetts) Agricultural Society, entitled "The Succession of Forest Trees," in which he analyzes aspects of what later came to be understood as forest ecology and urges farmers to plant trees in natural patterns of succession; the address is later published in (among other places) "Excursions", becoming perhaps his most influential ecological contribution to conservationist thought.
- 1862 — John Ruskin publishes Unto This Last, which contains a proto-environmental indictment of the effects of unrestricted industrial expansion on both human beings and the natural world. The book influences Mahatma Gandhi, William Morris and Patrick Geddes.
- 1864 — George Perkins Marsh publishes Man and Nature (revised 1874 as The Earth as Modified by Human Action), the first systematic analysis of humanity's destructive impact on the natural environment and a work which becomes (in Lewis Mumford's words) "the fountain-head of the conservation movement."
- 1865 — William Stanley Jevons publishes The Coal Question raising concerns about the sustainability of coal energy.
- 1866 — The term ecology is coined in German as Oekologie by Ernst Haeckel (1834–1919) in his Generelle Morphologie der Organismen. Haeckel was an anatomist, zoologist, and field naturalist appointed professor of zoology at the Zoological Institute, Jena, in 1865. Haeckel was philosophically an enthusiastic Darwinian. Ecology is from the Greek oikos, meaning house or dwelling, and logos meaning discourse or the study of.

— The American Society for the Prevention of Cruelty to Animals is founded.

- 1869 — Samuel Bowles publishes Our New West, an influential traveller's account of the wilds and peoples of the West, in which he advocates preservation of other scenic areas such as Niagara Falls and the Adirondacks.
- 1872 — The term acid rain is coined by Robert Angus Smith in the book Air and Rain.

— World's first national park, Yellowstone National Park.
— Arbor Day was founded by J. Sterling Morton of Nebraska City, Nebraska. It occurs every year on the last Friday in April in the US.

- 1873 — International Meteorological Organization is formed.
- 1873 — Friedrich Nietzsche develops the notion of a lifeless earth without redemption or replacement in his essay "On Truth and Lies in the Non-Moral Sense," and introduces the image of nature without humanity in a manner that not previously been made explicit.
- 1874 — Charles Hallock establishes Forest and Stream magazine sparking a US national debate about ethics and hunting.

— German graduate student Othmar Zeidler first synthesises DDT, later to be used as an insecticide.

- 1876 — British River Pollution Control Act makes it illegal to dump sewage into a stream.
- 1879 — U.S. Geological Survey formed. John Wesley Powell, explorer of the Colorado River a decade earlier, will become its head in March 1881.
- 1883 — Francis Galton coins the still controversial concept of eugenics in his book Inquiries into Human Faculty and Its Development.
- 1889 — The Extermination of the American Bison by William Temple Hornaday, described by a contemporary scholar as the first important text of the American wildlife conservation movement, is published. The book argues for the protection of the small number of bison in Yellowstone National Park.
- 1890 — Yosemite National Park Bill, established the Yosemite and Sequoia National Parks in California.
- 1891 — Oscar Baumann, Austrian explorer of East Africa, publishes an eye-witness account of the extreme drought period 1883–1902 called Emutai by the Maasai.

— General Revision Act.

- 1892 — John Muir, (1838–1914), founded the Sierra Club.
- 1895 — Svante Arrhenius presented to the Stockholm Physical Society the paper “On the Influence of Carbonic Acid in the Air upon the Temperature of the Ground.” It is the first scientific work concerning the influence of a rise in carbon dioxide on atmospheric warming. He used previous studies by Josef Stefan, Arvid Högbom, Samuel Langley, Léon Teisserenc de Bort, Knut Ångström, Alexander Buchan, Luigi De Marchi, Joseph Fourier, C.S.M. Pouillet, and John Tyndall.
- 1895 — Sewage cleanup in London means the return of some fish species (grilse, whitebait, flounder, eel, smelt) to the River Thames.

== 20th century ==
- 1902 — George Washington Carver writes How to Build Up Worn Out Soils.
- 1903 — March 14, US President Theodore Roosevelt creates first National Bird Preserve, (the beginning of the Wildlife Refuge system), on Pelican Island, Florida

— 7300 hectares of land in the Lake District of the Andes foothills in Patagonia are donated by Francisco Moreno as the first park, Nahuel Huapi National Park, in what eventually becomes the National Park System of Argentina.

- 1905 — The term smog is coined by Henry Antoine Des Voeux in a London meeting to express concern over air pollution.

— The National Audubon Society is founded.

- 1906 — Antiquities Act, passed by US Congress which authorized the president to set aside national monument sites.

— San Francisco earthquake and subsequent fires destroy much of the city.

- 1908 — Muir Woods National Monument was established on January 9 and now governed by the National Park Service.

— The National Conservation Commission, appointed in June by President Roosevelt.
— An article by Robert Underwood Johnson in Century magazine, "A High Price to Pay for Water," helps bring the Hetch Hetchy controversy to national attention.

- 1909 — US President Theodore Roosevelt convenes the North American Conservation Conference, held in Washington, D.C. and attended by representatives of Canada, Newfoundland, Mexico, and the United States.

=== 1910s ===
- 1910 — Gifford Pinchot publishes The Fight For Conservation.
- 1913 — US Congress enacts law which destroys the Hetch Hetchy Valley.
- 1913 — Ludwig Klages delivers the lecture "Man and Earth," an early and sustained meditation on extinction that begins to conceive of mass-extinction.
- 1916 — US Congress creates the National Park Service.
- 1918 — The Save the Redwoods League is founded to protect the remaining coast redwood trees. Over 60% of the redwoods in California's state redwood parks have been protected by the organization.

— Scientific American reports alcohol-gasoline anti-knock blend is "universally" expected to be the fuel of the future. Seven years later, in Public Health Service hearings, General Motors and Standard Oil spokesmen will claim that there are no alternatives to leaded gasoline as an anti-knock additive.
— Congress approves the Migratory Bird Treaty Act of 1918, which implements a 1916 Convention (between the U.S. and Britain, acting for Canada) for the Protection of Migratory birds, and establishes responsibility for international migratory bird protection.
– Spanish flu kills between 50 and 100 million people worldwide

- 1919 — The National Parks Conservation Association is founded.

=== 1920s ===
- 1920 — Theoretical Biology by Jakob von Uexküll. Uexküll's work becomes important to the theory of embodied cognition, and thus begins formally to erode the notion of a better resurrected world after death and/or 'the apocalypse'/extinction in the west.
- 1921 — Thomas Midgley Jr. discovers lead components to be an efficient antiknock agent in gasoline engines. In spite of the well known toxic effects, lead was in ubiquitous use. It was first banned from use in Japan in 1986.
- 1922 — The Izaak Walton League is founded.
- 1924 — The death of English textile worker Nellie Kershaw from asbestosis was the first account of disease attributed to occupational asbestos exposure.
- 1927 — Great Mississippi Flood.
- 1928 — Thomas Midgley Jr. develops chlorofluorocarbons (CFC's) as a non-toxic refrigerant. The first warnings of damage to stratospheric ozone were published by Molina and Rowland 1974. They shared the 1995 Nobel Prize for Chemistry for their work. Since 1987 world production is reduced under the Montreal Protocol and banned in most countries.
- 1929 — the Swann Chemical Company develops polychlorinated biphenyl (PCBs) for transformer coolant use. Research in the 1960s revealed PCBs to be potent carcinogens. Banned from production in the United States in 1976, probably 1 million tonnes of PCBs were manufactured in total globally.

— Migratory Bird Conservation Act

=== 1930s ===
- 1930–1940 — The Dust Bowl, widespread land degradation due to drought in the North American prairie.
- 1930 — World human population reached two billion.
- 1933 — Legislation on Animal rights adopted, Germany.

— Publication of Game Management by Aldo Leopold

- 1933 — Establishment of the Civilian Conservation Corps as part of the New Deal programmes initiated by U.S. President Franklin Delano Roosevelt which resulted, amongst other environmental successes, in over 2.3 billion trees planted in the U.S.
- 1933 — Convention Relative to the Preservation of Fauna and Flora in their Natural State signed by Belgium, Egypt, Italy, Anglo-Egyptian Sudan, Union of South Africa, the United Kingdom, British India, Tanganyika and Portugal.
- 1934 — Fish and Wildlife Coordination Act.
- 1934 — A Foray into the World of Plants and Animals is published by Jakob von Uexküll. This book is an attempt to popularize the theory of embodied cognition that Uexküll begins to develop in Theoretical Biology (a theory that erodes the consolatory notions of afterlife and apocalypse widely diffused in the west.)
- 1935 — Soil Conservation and Domestic Allotment Act.

— The Wilderness Society is founded

- 1936 — The National Wildlife Federation is founded.
- 1939 — The insecticidal properties of DDT discovered by Paul Hermann Müller, who was awarded the 1948 Nobel Prize in Physiology and Medicine for his efforts. The first ban on its use came in 1970.

=== 1940s ===
- 1947 — Federal Insecticide, Fungicide, and Rodenticide Act (FIFRA)

— Defenders of Wildlife founded.

- 1948 — World Conservation Union or International Union for Conservation of Nature and Natural Resources (IUCN) is an international organization dedicated to natural resource conservation. Founded in 1948, its headquarters is located in Gland, Switzerland.

— Fairfield Osborn publishes Our Plundered Planet.
— William Vogt publishes Road to Survival.

- 1949 — First known dioxin exposure incident, in a Nitro, West Virginia herbicide production plant. Extensively used by the British during the Malayan Emergency and the US during the Vietnam War 1961 – 1971 as Agent Orange. Production ban in the US on some component from 1970.

— Aldo Leopold publishes A Sand County Almanac

=== 1950s ===
- 1951 — The Nature Conservancy is an environmental organization founded in the United States.

— World Meteorological Organization (WMO) established by the United Nations.
— Drinking water fluoridation becomes an official policy of the U.S. Public Health Service to reduce tooth decay, soon followed by other countries.

- 1954 — The first nuclear power plant to generate electricity for a power grid started operations at Obninsk, Soviet Union on 27 June. The first substantial accident happened on 10 October 1957 in Windscale, England.

— Watershed Protection and Flood Prevention Act
— Harrison Brown publishes The Challenge of Man's Future.

- 1955 — Air Pollution Control Act
- 1956 — Minamata disease, a neurological syndrome caused by severe mercury poisoning.

— Fish and Wildlife Act.

- 1958 — Mauna Loa Observatory initiates monitoring of atmospheric Carbon Dioxide (CO_{2}) levels. The time series eventually became the main reference on global atmospheric change.

=== 1960s ===
- 1960 — World human population reached three billion.

— Mobilisation in France to preserve the Vanoise National Park in the Alpes (Val d'Isère, Tignes, etc.) from an important touristic project. The park itself was created three years later, in 1963, and was the first French natural park.
— Wallace Stegner writes the Wilderness Letter, credited with helping lead to Wilderness Act.
— Federal Water Pollution Control Act

- 1961 — World Wildlife Fund (WWF) registered as a charitable trust in Morges, Switzerland, an international organization for the conservation, research and restoration of the natural environment.
- 1962 — Rachel Carson publishes Silent Spring.

— Murray Bookchin publishes Our Synthetic Environment
— The first White House Conservation Conference takes place.

- 1963 — The Partial Nuclear Test Ban Treaty is signed by the U.S., the U.K. and the U.S.S.R.

— Clean Air Act

- 1964 — Norman Borlaug takes position as the director of the International Wheat Improvement Program in Texcoco, Mexico. The program leads to the Green Revolution.

— Wilderness Act.
— United States Postal Service releases John Muir stamp.

- 1965 — In the Storm King case, a judge rules that aesthetic impacts could be considered in deciding whether Consolidated Edison could demolish a mountain, a landmark case in environmental law.

— Northeast Blackout of 1965
— Water Quality Act and Solid Waste Disposal Act were first proposed.
— Amendments to the Clean Air Act

- 1966 — National Wildlife Refuge System Act.

— Fur Seal Act.
— National Historic Preservation Act
— Air inversion in New York City
— 1966 Palomares B-52 crash
— Ralph Nader publishes Unsafe at Any Speed

- 1967 — Environmental Defense Fund founded.

— Torrey Canyon oil spill
— Amendments to the Clean Air Act.
— Apollo 1 fire

- 1968 — The Apollo 8 photograph Earthrise.

— National Trails System Act.
— Wild and Scenic Rivers Act.
— Paul R. Ehrlich publishes The Population Bomb.
— Zero Population Growth founded.
— UNESCO hosts the Paris Biosphere Conference, which would ultimately result in the creation of the Man and the Biosphere Programme
— Club of Rome founded.

- 1969 — National Environmental Policy Act including the first requirements on Environmental impact assessment.

— Accidental pollution of the Rhine in Europe, by 500 liters of Endosulfan, a kind of insecticide. The river was contaminated on more than 600 km and more than 20 million fish died.
— The Icelandic summer-spawning herring stock collapses as a result of a combination of high fishing pressure and deteriorating environmental conditions. From being a stock that was distributed over large areas in the North Atlantic, the stock was reduced to a small stock in Norwegian coastal waters. International efforts have later started to rebuild the stock.
— Category 5 Hurricane Camille caused damage and destruction across much of the Gulf Coast of the United States.
— Friends of the Earth founded.
— 1969 Santa Barbara oil spill
— Cuyahoga River Fire
— Food and Drug Administration bans sodium cyclamate and places limits on the use of monosodium glutamate
— René Dubos publishes So Human an Animal
— Ecologist Frank Fraser Darling invited to give the Reith Lectures.

=== 1970s ===
- 1970 — Earth Day – April 22, millions of people gather in the United States for the first Earth Day organized by Gaylord Nelson, former senator of Wisconsin, and Denis Hayes, Harvard graduate student.

— US Environmental Protection Agency established.
— Francis A. Schaeffer publishes Pollution and the Death of Man.
— Arne Næss leads the nonviolent civil disobedience protest against damming of the Mardalsfossen waterfall, later publishing on the deep ecology philosophy.
— League of Conservation Voters founded.
— Natural Resources Defense Council founded.
— Norman Borlaug, the father of the Green Revolution, wins the Nobel Peace Prize.
— A Sand County Almanac by Aldo Leopold is reissued.
— Occupational Safety and Health Act

- 1971 — The international environmental organisation Greenpeace founded in Vancouver, Canada. Greenpeace has later developed national and regional offices in 41 countries worldwide.

— Center for Science in the Public Interest founded.
— International Institute for Environment and Development established in London, England. One offshoot is the World Resources Institute with its biannual report World Resources since 1984.
— Nonprofit Keep America Beautiful launches the nationwide "Crying Indian" television public service advertisement, reaching nearly every American household.
— Public Citizen founded.
— Calvert Cliffs' Coordinating Committee, Inc. v. United States Atomic Energy Commission
– Marvin Gaye releases What's Going On, which becomes a massive hit record and classic protest song.

- 1972 — The Conference on the Human Environment, held in Stockholm, Sweden 5 to 16 June, the first of a series of world environmental conferences.

— United Nations Environment Programme founded as a result of the Stockholm conference.
— the Oslo Convention on dumping waste at sea, later merged with the Paris Convention on land-based sources of marine pollution into the Convention for the Protection of the Marine Environment of the North-East Atlantic.
— The Club of Rome publishes its report Limits to Growth, which has sold 30 million copies in more than 30 translations, making it the best selling environmental book in world history.
— Marine Mammal Protection Act.
— Marine Protection, Research, and Sanctuaries Act (also known as Ocean Dumping Act).
— Noise Control Act.
— Clean Water Act.
— Coastal Zone Management Act.
— The Blue Marble photograph
— Federal Insecticide, Fungicide, and Rodenticide Act (FIFRA) – major amendments
— (June 14) After seven months of hearings, the United States Environmental Protection Agency bans most uses of DDT.
— The Trust for Public Land founded.
— Values Party founded.
— A Blueprint for Survival published.

- 1973 — OPEC announces oil embargo against United States.

— World Conservation Union (IUCN) meeting drafts the Convention on International Trade in Endangered Species of Wild Fauna and Flora (CITES)
— Endangered Species Preservation Act.
— E. F. Schumacher publishes Small Is Beautiful.
— Cousteau Society founded.

- 1974 — Chlorofluorocarbons are first hypothesized to cause ozone thinning.

— National Reserves Management Act.
— World human population reached 4 billion.
— State Natural Heritage Program Network launched in the US.
- The Energy Reorganization Act of 1974 was passed in the United States.

- 1975 — Energy Policy and Conservation Act.
- 1976 — Dioxin accidental release in Seveso, Italy on 10 July, killing animals and traumatizing the population.

— Resource Conservation and Recovery Act (RCRA)
— Magnuson–Stevens Fishery Conservation and Management Act

- 1977 — Surface Mining Control and Reclamation Act.

— Soil and Water Resources Conservation Act.
— Abalone Alliance founded.
— Sea Shepherd Conservation Society founded.
— New York City blackout of 1977
— Ekofisk oil field spill.
— U.S. admits to neutron bomb testing.

- 1978 — Brominated flame-retardants replaces PCBs as the major chemical flame retardant. Swedish scientists noticed these substances to be accumulating in human breast milk 1998. First ban on use in the EU 2004.

— Love Canal contamination revealed.
— Amoco Cadiz oil spill
— Samuel Epstein publishes The Politics of Cancer
— David Ehrenfeld publishes The Arrogance of Humanism
— Offshore drilling begins off the coast of New Jersey

- 1979 — The Convention on Long-Range Transboundary Air Pollution is established to reduce air pollutant emissions and acid rain.

— Three Mile Island accident, worst nuclear power accident in US history.
— Hans Jonas publishes The Imperative of Responsibility: In Search of Ethics for the Technological Age.
— Supersonic airliner Concorde is put in regular operation in spite of concern due to its sonic boom and the potential for its engine exhaust to damage the ozone layer. The last regular flight landed in 2003.
— Fifth largest oil spill ever when the S.S. Atlantic Empress collides with Aegean Captain off of Trinidad and Tobago

=== 1980s ===
- 1980 – Superfund (Comprehensive Environmental Response, Compensation, and Liability Act or CERCLA)

— Earth First! founded
— The Global 2000 Report to the President
— International Union for Conservation of Nature publishes its World Conservation Strategy
— William R. Catton Jr. publishes Overshoot: The Ecological Basis of Revolutionary Change
— Alaska National Interest Lands Conservation Act
— Low Level Radioactive Waste Policy Act of 1980

- 1981 — Lois Gibbs founds the Citizens' Clearinghouse for Hazardous Waste
- 1982 — Coastal Barrier Resources Act.

— United Nations Convention on the Law of the Sea (UNCLOS) is signed on December the 10th at Montego Bay. Part XII of which significantly developed port-state control of pollution from ships.
— Bat Conservation International founded.
— Co-op America founded.
— Earth Island Institute founded.
— Rocky Mountain Institute founded.
— Sewergate
— World Charter for Nature
— Nuclear Waste Policy Act
— Evacuation of Times Beach, Missouri

- 1984 — Bhopal disaster in the Indian state of Madhya Pradesh (Methyl isocyanate leakage).

— Green Committees of Correspondence founded.
— North America Bioregional Congress founded.
— Brundtland Commission appointed.
— 1984–1985 famine in Ethiopia
— Worldwatch Institute publishes its first State of the World report.

- 1985 — Rainforest Action Network founded.

— Chemical leak in Institute, West Virginia
— Sinking of the Rainbow Warrior
— Antarctic ozone hole discovered.
— FDA approved bovine somatotropin

- 1986 — Chernobyl, world's worst nuclear power accident occurs at a plant in Ukraine.

— Emergency Wetlands Resources Act.
— Tetraethyllead phase-out was completed in the US.
— Northern Rivers Rerouting Project abandoned by the USSR government.
— the German Physical Society publishes warning of an impending climate catastrophe

- 1987 — World human population reached 5 billion.

— The Report of the Brundtland Commission, Our Common Future on sustainable development, is published.
— Conservation International founded.
— First Debt-for-Nature Swap
— First meeting of the U.S. Greens
— Montreal Protocol opened for signature.
— National Appliance Energy Conservation Act

- 1988 — Ocean Dumping Ban Act.

— Intergovernmental Panel on Climate Change (IPCC) was established by two United Nations organizations, the World Meteorological Organization (WMO) and the United Nations Environment Programme (UNEP) to assess the "risk of human-induced climate change".
— Student Environmental Action Coalition founded.
— Lawsuit brought by Environmental Defense Fund results in McDonald's agreeing to use biodegradable containers.
— Alternative Motor Fuels Act

- 1989 — Exxon Valdez creates largest oil spill in US history.

— Montreal Protocol on substances that deplete the ozone layer entered into force on January 1. Since then, it has undergone five revisions, in 1990 (London), 1992 (Copenhagen), 1995 (Vienna), 1997 (Montreal), and 1999 (Beijing).
— influenced by protests by Kirishi residents, the USSR Supreme Soviet decides to close down the country's eight paraffin-fed single-cell protein plants.
- The Natural Step founded.

=== 1990s ===
- 1990 — National Environmental Education Act.

— European Environment Agency was established by EEC Regulation 1210/1990 and became operational in 1994. It is headquartered in Copenhagen, Denmark.
— The IPCC first assessment report was completed, and served as the basis of the United Nations Framework Convention on Climate Change (UNFCCC).
— Clean Air Act – major amendment
— Redwood Summer
— Dolphin safe label introduced.
— Leave No Trace education program developed by the United States Forest Service in conjunction with the National Outdoor Leadership School (NOLS).

- 1991 — The Protocol on Environmental Protection to the Antarctic Treaty was signed 4 October. The agreement provides for the protection of the Antarctic environment through five specific annexes on marine pollution, fauna, and flora, environmental impact assessments, waste management, and protected areas. It prohibits all activities relating to mineral resources except scientific.

— World's worst oil spill occurs in Kuwait during war with Iraq.
— Kuwaiti oil fires
— Global Environment Facility (GEF) was established by donor governments.

- 1992 — The Earth Summit, held in Rio de Janeiro from June 3 to June 14, was unprecedented for a United Nations conference, in terms of both its size and the scope of its concerns.

— United Nations Framework Convention on Climate Change opened for signature on 9 May ahead of the Earth Summit in Rio de Janeiro.
— The international Convention on Biological Diversity opened for signature on 5 June in connection with the Earth Summit in Rio de Janeiro.
— World Oceans Day began on 8 June at the Earth Summit in Rio de Janeiro.
— The Canadian government closes all eastern seaboard fishing grounds due to insufficient recovery of the stock.
— Ireland's Environmental Protection Agency established.
— The metaphor Ecological footprint is coined by William Rees.

- 1993 — The Great Flood of 1993 was one of the most destructive floods in United States history involving the Missouri and Mississippi River valleys.
- 1994 — United Nations Convention to Combat Desertification.

— The first genetically modified food crop released to the market. It remains a strongly controversial environmental issue.
— Leave No Trace Center for Outdoor Ethics is established.

- 1995 — Scotland's Environmental Protection Agency is established.
- 1996 — Western Shield, a wildlife conservation project is started in Western Australia, and through successful work has taken several species off of the state, national, and international (IUCN) Endangered Species Lists..
- 1997 — July, U.S. Senate unanimously passed by a 95–0 vote the Byrd-Hagel Resolution, which stated that the United States should not be a signatory to any protocol that did not include binding targets and timetables for developing as well as industrialized nations.

— The Kyoto Protocol was negotiated in Kyoto, Japan in December. It is actually an amendment to the United Nations Framework Convention on Climate Change (UNFCCC). Countries that ratify this protocol commit to reduce their emissions of carbon dioxide and five other greenhouse gases.

- 1999 — World human population reached 6 billion.

== 21st century ==
- 2001 — U.S. rejects the Kyoto Protocol.

— The IPCC release the IPCC Third Assessment Report.

- 2002 — Earth Summit, held in Johannesburg a United Nations conference.
- 2003 — The world's largest reservoir, the Three Gorges Dam begins filling 1 June.

— European Heat Wave resulting in the premature deaths of at least 35,000 people.

- 2004—The Norwegian Nobel Committee has decided to award the Nobel Peace Prize for 2004 to Wangari Maathai for her contribution to sustainable development, democracy and peace. Peace on earth depends on our ability to secure our living environment. ... Maathai combines science, social commitment and active politics.
- 2004 — 2004 Indian Ocean earthquake and tsunami affects countries surrounding the Indian Ocean, killing nearly a quarter of a million people.

— FBI initiates Operation Backfire – an anti-terrorist law enforcement operation against "Eco-Radicals."

- 2005 — Hurricanes Katrina, Rita, and Wilma cause widespread destruction and environmental harm to coastal communities in the US Gulf Coast region.

— The Kyoto Protocol came into force on February 16 following ratification by Russia on November 18, 2004.

- 2006 — Former U.S. vice president Al Gore releases An Inconvenient Truth, a documentary that describes global warming. The next year, Gore is awarded the Nobel Peace Prize (jointly with the Intergovernmental Panel for Climate Change) for this and related efforts.

— The BBC's "Climate Chaos" season includes Are We Changing Planet Earth?, a two-part investigation into global warming by David Attenborough.
— The Stern Review is published. The British Prime Minister, Tony Blair, says that it shows that scientific evidence of global warming was "overwhelming" and its consequences "disastrous".
— World human population reached 6.5 billion

- 2007 — The IPCC release the IPCC Fourth Assessment Report.

— Power Shift 2007 – the first National Youth Climate Conference, held in College Park, MD and Washington, D.C. November 2–5, 2007. Power Shift 2007: The Energy Action Coalition saw over 5,000 youth converge in Washington, D.C. to build their movement, lobby congress, and make a statement about the way youth feel about Global Warming.

- 2007 — The MT Hebei Spirit oil spill was a major oil spill in South Korea that began on the morning of 7 December 2007.
- 2009 — Power Shift 2009 – The Energy Action Coalition hosted the second national youth climate conference to be held at the Washington Convention Center from February 27 to March 2, 2009. The conference aims to attract more than 10,000 students and young people and will include a Lobby Day.

=== 2010s ===
- 2010 – Deepwater Horizon Oil Spill reveals the vulnerability of fossil fuel infrastructure.
- 2011 — United Nations designates day that world human population reached 7 billion.
- 2011 - At the Fukushima nuclear power plant, the gigantic wave surged over defences and flooded the reactors, sparking a major disaster.
- 2014 — The IPCC release the IPCC Fifth Assessment Report,
- 2015 - The Paris Agreement is signed; the goal is to keep global warming below 2 degrees.
- 2016 - President Trump, who describes climate change as a "hoax", starts a series of attacks on environmental protection regulation. Consistent with a previous promise to dismantle the EPA, he selects Scott Pruitt, who made a career of attacking the EPA and lobbying for oil companies, as EPA administrator.
- 2018 - The IPCC releases a special report, warning that a 1.5 degree global warming could have disastrous consequences.
- 2018 - Greta Thunberg starts a school strike for climate, sitting outside the Swedish Parliament.
- 2019 - Earth Day and National Cleanup Day organize the first coordinated cleanup event held in all 50 States and US Territories

=== 2020s ===
- 2020 - the COVID-19 pandemic inspires stay-at-home orders, resulting in a modest decrease in CO_{2} production.
- 2020—The hottest year ever recorded wraps up the hottest decade ever recorded.
- 2020—The use of Personal Protective Equipment and Masks and disposables has exploded due to COVID-19.
- 2021 - Dutch court rules oil giant Royal Dutch Shell must reduce its GHG emissions with 45% by 2030 compared to 2019 emissions.
- 2021 - Western North America heat wave with temperatures reaching up to 49,6C.
- 2021 - President Biden rejoins the Paris Accord and reinstates essential environmental regulations.
- 2021 - European floods caused by heavy rain fall impacting multiple countries in Western Europe.
- 2021—IPCC's 6th report states that the science of climate change is irrefutable and that irreversible changes have already occurred.
- 2021—Japan announced it will release 1.25 million tons of treated wastewater contaminated by the wrecked Fukushima Daiichi Nuclear Power Plant into the Pacific Ocean. The government said it is the best way to deal with tritium and trace amounts of other radionuclides in the water.
- 2022 - In West Virginia v. EPA, the US Supreme Court limits the ability of the EPA to regulate carbon emissions.

== See also ==
- Carbon capture and storage (timeline)
- Environmental issue
- Filmography of environmentalism
- List of environmental issues
- Timeline of the New Zealand environment
- Plogoff nuclear power plant project
