= 1989 in the environment =

This is a list of notable events relating to the environment in 1989. They relate to environmental law, conservation, environmentalism and environmental issues.

== Events ==
- The global concentration of carbon dioxide in Earth's atmosphere reaches 350 ppm (parts per million) by volume. The level of 350ppm is regarded by James Hansen as the maximum permissible level that will avoid a climate tipping point.
- The Tasman Accord was signed in New Zealand by Tasman Forestry Ltd, environmental groups and the Government.
- The first national park in the Netherlands is established in Schiermonnikoog.

=== January ===
- The Montreal Protocol on Substances that Deplete the Ozone Layer (a protocol to the Vienna Convention for the Protection of the Ozone Layer) comes into force. It is an international treaty designed to protect the ozone layer by phasing out the production of numerous substances believed to be responsible for ozone depletion.

=== March ===
- The Exxon Valdez oil spill occurred in Prince William Sound, Alaska.
- Edward Abbey dies. Abbey was an American author and essayist noted for his advocacy of environmental issues and as author of The Monkey Wrench Gang.

=== May ===
- The last golden toad was sighted and the species is now classed as extinct.

=== October ===
- The Langkawi Declaration on the Environment was made by the assembled Heads of Government of the Commonwealth of Nations on the issue of environmental sustainability. It was issued at Langkawi, Malaysia, during the tenth Commonwealth Heads of Government Meeting.

== See also ==
- Human impact on the environment
- List of environmental issues
- List of years in the environment
