= 1964 in the environment =

This is a list of notable events relating to the environment in 1964. They relate to environmental law, conservation, environmentalism and environmental issues.

== Events ==
=== January ===
- The United States Army Corps of Engineers built a dike around the Estelline Salt Springs which caused an increase in salinity, driving many species to extinction, including Hemigrapsus estellinensis and an undescribed barnacle.

=== April ===
- Rachel Carson, author of the influential book Silent Spring, dies at the age of 56.

=== September ===
- President Lyndon B. John signs the Wilderness Act on September 3, 1964.

== See also ==
- Human impact on the environment
- List of years in the environment
