= 1981 in the environment =

This is a list of notable events relating to the environment in 1981. They relate to environmental law, conservation, environmentalism and environmental issues.

== Events ==
- The Protected Natural Areas Programme began in New Zealand.
- A number of protected areas were established in 1981, including Olvassuo Strict Nature Reserve in Finland.

=== January ===
- Ronald Reagan signed an executive order on 28 January 1981, which enacted Jimmy Carter's reform of oil price supports, immediately, allowing the free market to adjust oil prices in the United States.

=== April ===
- The Japan Australia Migratory Bird Agreement treaty came into force. It aims to minimise harm to the major areas used by birds which migrate between the two countries.

=== October ===
- The Wildlife and Countryside Act 1981 is passed in the United Kingdom on 30 October 1981.

== See also ==
- Human impact on the environment
- List of environmental issues
- List of years in the environment
