= 1959 in the environment =

This is a list of notable events relating to the environment in 1959. They relate to environmental law, conservation, environmentalism and environmental issues.

Before the environmental movement, the most common phrase used for this concept was "environmental conservation".

== Events ==
A number of protected areas were established in 1959, including Cook Island Nature Reserve in Australia, Dead Horse Point State Park in Utah, Erie National Wildlife Refuge in Pennsylvania, the world famous Galápagos National Park in Ecuador, and the Kalambatritra Special Reserve in Madagascar.

=== April ===
- The 1959 Uruguayan floods were the most devastating in the modern history of Uruguay.

== See also ==
- Human impact on the environment
- List of environmental issues
- List of years in the environment
