= 1950 in the environment =

This is a list of notable events relating to the environment in 1950. They relate to environmental law, conservation, environmentalism and environmental issues.

== Events ==
- Several Protected areas were established in 1950, including Adams Lake State Park, Ohio.
- The Dingell–Johnson Act was signed by President Harry S Truman.
- The Flood Control Act of 1950 was signed by Truman.
- The Saugeen Valley Conservation Authority was created.
- The Wildlife Conservation Act 1950 was signed by Truman.

== See also ==
- Human impact on the environment
- List of environmental issues
- Years in the environment
