= 1948 in the environment =

This is a list of notable events relating to the environment in 1948. They relate to environmental law, conservation, environmentalism and environmental issues.

== Events ==
October

- The Donora smog, an air inversion resulting in a wall of smog, killed 20 people and sickened 7,000 more in Donora, Pennsylvania, in the United States. It was a major air pollution incident in the US and was due to a combination of a specific weather pattern and pollution from industrial activity
- The Great Plan for the Transformation of Nature, put forth by Joseph Stalin, was implemented.

November

- The takahe, a flightless bird indigenous to New Zealand, is rediscovered in a mountainous area of Fiordland. The population and range of the bird had been severely reduced following the human settlement of New Zealand.
- The International Convention for the Regulation of Whaling came into effect.

== See also ==
- Human impact on the environment
- List of environmental issues
- Years in the environment
