= 1961 in the environment =

This is a list of notable events relating to the environment in 1961. They relate to environmental law, conservation, environmentalism and environmental issues.

Before the environmental movement, the most common phrase used for this concept was "environmental conservation".

A number of notable environmentalists and politicians involved with environmental issues who came of age in the early 21st century were born in 1961.

== Events ==
- A number of protected areas were established in 1961, including Whiteshell Provincial Park, Manitoba, and the Cape Cod National Seashore.

=== January ===
- John F. Kennedy was inaugurated President of the United States on January 20, 1961. He would sign some of the first important United States energy laws and environmental laws, although he also initiated Operation Nougat, a series of nuclear weapons tests from 1961 to 1962.

=== June ===
- The Antarctic Treaty System was effective 23 June 1961.

=== August ===
- President John F. Kennedy signed the Oil Pollution Act of 1961, which became effective immediately.
- Kennedy signed the legislation that creates the Cape Cod National Seashore, on August 7, 1961; he has previously sponsored the bill when he was Senator.

=== September ===
- President John F. Kennedy signed the Arms Control and Disarmament Act of 1961 on September 26, 1961, which became effective immediately.

== Births ==
- Randall Arauz was born 1961 (date publicly not available).

== Deaths ==
- Rafael Trujillo, the dictator of the Dominican Republic whose environmental policies were good, was assassinated on 30 May 1961.

== See also ==
- Human impact on the environment
- List of environmental issues
- List of years in the environment
