= 2014 in the environment =

This is a list of notable events relating to the environment in 2014. They relate to environmental law, conservation, environmentalism and environmental issues.

== Events ==
- The IPCC Fifth Assessment Report is set to be finalised and released.
- California delays its carbon trading programme until 2014 due to ongoing litigation.

=== February ===
- A facility in Eden, North Carolina spilled 39,000 tons of coal ash into the Dan River.

=== September ===
- Governor of California Jerry Brown signs the Sustainable Groundwater Management Act into law.

== See also ==
- Human impact on the environment
- List of environmental issues
- List of years in the environment
