= 1958 in the environment =

This is a list of notable events relating to the environment in 1958. They relate to environmental law, conservation, environmentalism and environmental issues.

Before the environmental movement, the most common phrase used for this concept was "environmental conservation".

== Events ==
- Tartu Students' Nature Conservation Circle in Finland, the oldest student nature conservation society in the world, was established.
- About 500 tornadoes occurred in the United States in 1958.
- A number of protected areas were established in 1958, including Aaron Provincial Park in Ontario, Catahoula National Wildlife Refuge in Louisiana, and Etosha Wildlife Preserve in what was then South West Africa (now Namibia),

=== March ===
- The March 18–22, 1958, nor'easter occurred.

=== September ===
- The United States Congress passed a law authorizing the creation of a federal protection program for the Nene, the endangered Hawaiian goose, which was down to fewer than 50 individuals.

== See also ==
- Human impact on the environment
- List of environmental issues
- List of years in the environment
