= 1995 in the environment =

This is a list of notable events relating to the environment in 1995. They relate to environmental law, conservation, environmentalism and environmental issues.

== Events ==
- The Alpine Convention, an international territorial treaty for the sustainable development of the Alps, entered into force.
- Greenpeace opposed the sinking of the Brent Spar oil rig in the North Sea.
- The Environment Act 1995 is passed in the United Kingdom, creating a number of new agencies and setting new standards for environmental management.

=== February ===
- February 16—The government of Bangladesh enacted the Bangladesh Environment Conservation Act.

=== November ===
- Nigerian environmental activist Ken Saro-Wiwa, along with eight others from the Movement for the Survival of the Ogoni People, are hanged by government forces.
- The Threatened Species Protection Act 1995 is passed by the Parliament of Tasmania.

== See also ==
- Human impact on the environment
- List of environmental issues
- List of years in the environment
