= 1975 in the environment =

This is a list of notable events relating to the environment in 1975. They relate to environmental law, conservation, environmentalism and environmental issues.

== Events ==
=== Unknown ===
- The Convention on the Prevention of Marine Pollution by Dumping of Wastes and Other Matter entered into force.
- The International Convention Relating to Intervention on the High Seas in Cases of Oil Pollution Casualties comes into effect.
- Ecotopia: The Notebooks and Reports of William Weston, the seminal utopian novel by Ernest Callenbach was published. The society described in the book is one of the first ecological utopias and was influential on the counterculture, and the green movement in the 1970s and thereafter.
- The Monkey Wrench Gang novel was published. The influential book, about the use of sabotage to ensure environmental protection, lead to the use of the term "monkeywrenching" to describe the technique.

=== January ===
- The Jakob Maersk oil spill occurred when the Danish oil tanker struck a sand bank while entering the port of Leixões, Portugal, causing a major oil spill.
- The Federal Noxious Weed Act of 1974 was passed in the United States.

=== July ===
- Virginia Governor Mills Godwin Jr. shuts down the James River to fishing for 100 miles, from Richmond to the Chesapeake Bay because of the Kepone catastrophe.
- CITES, the Convention on International Trade in Endangered Species of Wild Fauna and Flora, enters into force.

=== December ===
- The Ramsar Convention (The Convention on Wetlands of International Importance, especially as Waterfowl Habitat), an international treaty for the conservation and sustainable utilization of wetlands, entered into force.

== See also ==
- Human impact on the environment
- List of environmental issues
- List of years in the environment
