= 1962 in the environment =

This is a list of notable events relating to the environment in 1962. They relate to environmental law, conservation, environmentalism and environmental issues.

The environmental movement started with the publication in 1962 of Silent Spring by Rachel Carson.

A large number of notable environmentalists and politicians involved with environmental issues who came of age in the early 21st century were born in 1962.

== Events ==
- The first major Arctic oil field, the Tazovskoye Field, is discovered in Russia, at the time part of the Soviet Union.
- A number of protected areas were established in 1962, including Daan Viljoen Game Reserve in what is now Namibia.

=== September ===
Silent Spring, the widely acclaimed book by Rachel Carson which documented the effects of indiscriminate use of pesticides, is published.

== Births ==
- Paula Abdul, singer, dancer, and animal rights activist
- François Alabrune, French jurist and representative to the Organisation for the Prohibition of Chemical Weapons
- Wasantha Aluwihare, Sri Lankan Deputy Minister of Mahaweli Development and Environment
- Mahinda Amaraweera, Sri Lankan Minister of Wildlife and Forest Resources Conservation
- Kevin Anderson, Climate scientist
- Sara Angelucci, photographer known for her photo-collages of endangered or extinct North American birds
- Charlie Angus, Canadian environmentalist
- Princess Astrid of Belgium, anti-land mine activist
- Tammy Baldwin, United States Senator from Wisconsin, who has pushed for Climate action and co-sponsored several environmental bills
- Chimunthu Banda, Minister of Mines, Natural Resources and Environmental Affairs of Malawi
- Sylvia Banda, Zambian local food activist
- Jacqueline Rae Beggs, a New Zealand entomologist and ecologist specialising in biodiversity and biosecurity
- Mark Begich, Senator from Alaska who supported cap-and-trade, and believes in Climate change, but also drilling for oil
- Sergio Bergman, Argentine Minister of the Environment and Sustainable Development
- Rachel Berwick, American sculptor who explores themes of extinction and loss in the natural world
- Lisa Blunt Rochester, of Delaware, who has served on environmental law committees in both the United States House of Representatives and Senate
- Louis Boisgibault, French academic expert on Energy transition
- Dan Boyle (politician), Green Party elected official from Ireland
- Nick Brown (academic), British botonist
- Manuel Pulgar-Vidal, Minister of the Environment of Peru
- Ana Lya Uriarte, Chilean Minister for the Environment
- Gian Carlo Venturini, Secretary of State for the Territory and the Environment, Agriculture and Relations with the AASP; twice Captain Regent of San Marino

== Deaths ==
- Enos (chimpanzee), astronaut
- Cacareco, critically endangered Black rhinoceros and political candidate

== See also ==
- Human impact on the environment
- List of environmental issues
- List of years in the environment
