= 1965 in the environment =

This is a list of notable events relating to the environment in 1965. They relate to environmental law, conservation, environmentalism and environmental issues.

== Events ==
- The Brazilian Forest Code passed into law.

=== October ===
- US President Lyndon B. Johnson signed the National Emissions Standards Act, an amendment to the Clean Air Act of 1963. The amendment set the first federal vehicle emissions standards.

=== November ===
- The Northeast blackout of 1965 occurs on November 9, 1965.

=== December ===
- On December 29, the Second Circuit Court of Appeals issues the Scenic Hudson Preservation Conference v. Federal Power Commission, holding in the Storm King case, that aesthetic impacts could be considered in deciding whether Consolidated Edison could demolish a mountain, a landmark case in environmental law.

== See also ==
- List of years in the environment
