= 2017 in the environment =

This is a list of notable events relating to the environment in 2017. They relate to environmental law, conservation, environmentalism and environmental issues.

== Events ==
- Ongoing - Climate change litigation
- Ongoing – Puʻu ʻŌʻō eruption
- International Year of Sustainable tourism for all

== See also ==
- Human impact on the environment
- List of environmental issues
- List of years in the environment
