= 1979 in the environment =

This is a list of notable events relating to the environment in 1979. They relate to environmental law, conservation, environmentalism and environmental issues.

== Events ==
- The Environmental Planning and Assessment Act 1979 was passed in the Australian state of New South Wales.
- International Year of the Child
- The gastric-brooding frog is presumed to be extinct.

=== March ===
- The Three Mile Island accident partial nuclear meltdown occurred at the Three Mile Island power plant in Dauphin County, Pennsylvania in the United States. It was the worst accident in U.S. commercial nuclear power plant history, and resulted in the release of small amounts of radioactive gases and radioactive iodine into the environment.

=== June ===
- The Ixtoc I oil spill occurred in the Gulf of Mexico. The well had suffered a blowout resulting in one of largest oil spills in history.

=== July ===
- The Church Rock Uranium Mill Spill occurred in the United States when a uranium mill tailings disposal pond breached its dam. Over 1,000 tons of radioactive mill waste and millions of gallons of mine effluent flowed into the Puerco River, and contaminants traveled 80 miles (130 km) downstream to Navajo County, Arizona. Local residents used river water for irrigation and livestock and were not immediately aware of the toxic danger.

=== November ===
- The MT Independenţa oil tanker collided with another ship and subsequently exploded. It burned for weeks, causing heavy air and sea pollution in the Istanbul area and the Sea of Marmara.

== See also ==
- Human impact on the environment
- List of environmental issues
- List of years in the environment
