= 1994 in the environment =

This is a list of notable events relating to the environment in 1994. They relate to environmental law, conservation, environmentalism and environmental issues.

== Events ==
=== January ===
- An oil spill occurred when the barge Morris J. Berman grounded off Punta Escambron, San Juan in Puerto Rico. The barge spilled approximately 800,000 gallons of #6 oil on the reef.
- The North American Agreement on Environmental Cooperation, an environmental agreement between the United States of America, Canada and Mexico as a side-treaty of the North American Free Trade Agreement (NAFTA), came into effect.

=== February ===
- United States President Bill Clinton signed Executive Order 12898, "Federal Actions to Address Environmental Justice in Minority Populations and Low-Income Populations", directing federal agencies to incorporate environmental justice into their missions.

=== March ===
- The United Nations Framework Convention on Climate Change (UNFCCC) enters into force.

=== April ===
- The National Fish and Wildlife Foundation Improvement Act of 1994 was enacted, expanding the authority and programs of the National Fish and Wildlife Foundation to support wildlife conservation projects throughout the United States.

=== June ===
- The Montréal Process, also known as the Working Group on Criteria and Indicators for the Conservation and Sustainable Management of Temperate and Boreal Forests, was formed in Geneva, Switzerland.
- The United Nations Convention to Combat Desertification (UNCCD) was adopted in Paris. The treaty became the first legally binding international agreement specifically addressing desertification and land degradation.

=== October ===
- The United Nations Convention to Combat Desertification was opened for signature in Paris following its adoption earlier in the year.
- United States President Bill Clinton signed the California Desert Protection Act of 1994, establishing Joshua Tree National Park, Death Valley National Park, and the Mojave National Preserve, while protecting millions of acres of desert wilderness.

=== December ===
- The United Nations General Assembly established the World Day to Combat Desertification and Drought, to be observed annually on 17 June.

== See also ==
- Human impact on the environment
- List of environmental issues
- List of years in the environment
