= 2024 in the environment =

This is an article of notable issues relating to the terrestrial environment of Earth in 2024. They relate to environmental events such as natural disasters, environmental sciences such as ecology and geoscience with a known relevance to contemporary influence of humanity on Earth, environmental law, conservation, environmentalism with major worldwide impact and environmental issues.

== Events ==
=== Environmental disasters ===
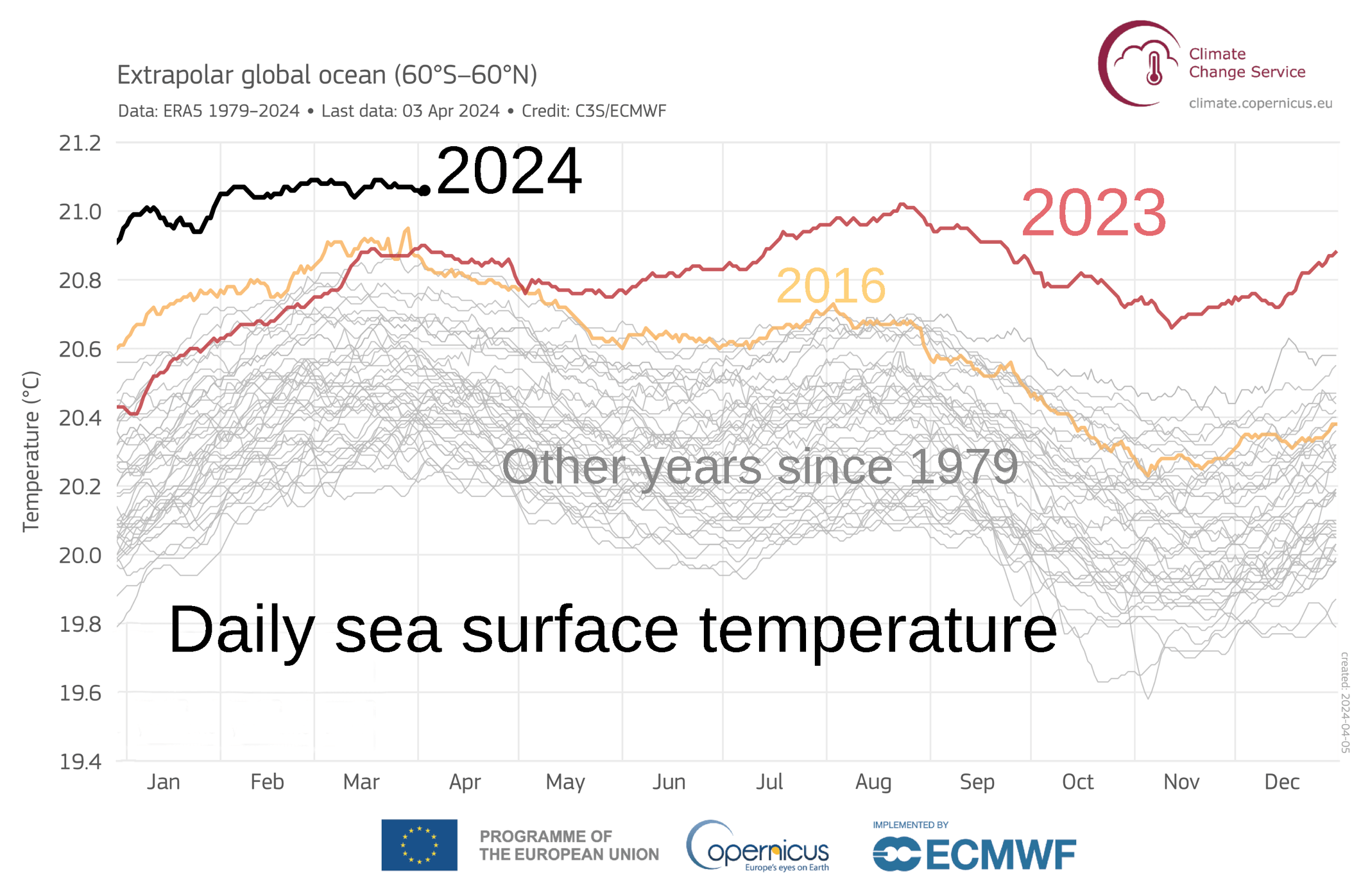
Chart showing daily sea surface temperatures in latitudes between 60 South and 60 North

Percentages of Earth's surface reaching a record June temperature as a function of time over years 1951 to 2024

== See also ==
=== General ===
- 2020s in environmental history
- 2024 in climate change
- Green recovery
- 2024 in space
- List of environmental issues
- List of years in the environment
- Outline of environmental studies

=== Natural environment ===
- List of large earthquakes in the 21st century
- List of large volcanic eruptions in the 21st century
- Lists of extinct animals#Recent extinction
- Category:Species described in 2024
- Category:Protected areas established in 2024

=== Artificial developments ===
- Timeline of sustainable energy research 2020–present
- 2024 in rail transport
- Human impact on the environment
- Disaster science
- Disaster response
