= 1954 in the environment =

This is a list of notable events relating to the environment in 1954. They relate to environmental law, conservation, environmentalism and environmental issues.

== Events ==
- The Nile perch were introduced into Lake Victoria in East Africa and since then it has been fished commercially. It is attributed with causing the extinction or near-extinction of several hundred native species.
- The first air pollution control law passes in New Jersey
- The Biharamulo Forest Reserve is established in Tanganyika Territory (what is now Tanzania).
- The Kanga Forest Reserve, also of Tanzania, was established.

July

- The Atomic Energy Act of 1954 was passed in the United States.

August

- The Watershed Protection and Flood Prevention Act of 1954 in the United States is enacted on August 4.

== See also ==
- Human impact on the environment
- List of years in the environment
