= 1990 in the environment =

This is a list of notable events relating to the environment in 1990. They relate to environmental law, conservation, environmentalism and environmental issues.

== Events ==
- The IPCC First Assessment Report (FAR) of the Intergovernmental Panel on Climate Change was completed. It served as the basis of the United Nations Framework Convention on Climate Change (UNFCCC).
- The Global Change Research Act of 1990 is passed in the United States. It is a law requiring research into global warming and related issues.
- Project Crimson begins. It is a conservation initiative in New Zealand to promote the protection of the pohutukawa and the rata that are under threat due to browsing by the introduced possum.
- The Talloires Declaration, a declaration for sustainability, was created for and by presidents of institutions of higher learning, and pledges that they will be world leaders in developing, creating, supporting and maintaining sustainability.

=== August ===
- US president George H. W. Bush signed the Oil Pollution Act of 1990.

=== November ===
- The Environmental Protection Act 1990 is passed in the United Kingdom.
- US president George H. W. Bush signed the Clean Air Act Amendments of 1990.

=== December ===
- The dusky seaside sparrow, found in southern Florida in the natural salt marshes of Merritt Island and along the St. Johns River, was officially declared extinct. The last definite known individual died on June 17, 1987.

== See also ==
- Human impact on the environment
- List of environmental issues
- List of years in the environment
