= 1982 in the environment =

This is a list of notable events relating to the environment in 1982. They relate to environmental law, conservation, environmentalism and environmental issues.

== Events ==
A number of protected areas were established in 1982, including the Albany Mudflats Ecological Reserve acquired by California Department of Fish and Wildlife by lease, the Alerce Andino National Park in Chile, Barbilla National Park in Costa Rica, the Idaho State Arboretum, and Podocarpus National Park in Ecuador.

=== April ===
- The Convention for the Conservation of Antarctic Marine Living Resources entered into force.

=== June ===
- The Convention on the Conservation of European Wildlife and Natural Habitats, also known as the Bern Convention, came into force.

=== November ===
- The Agreed Measures for the Conservation of Antarctic Fauna and Flora came into effect. It expired in 2011.

== See also ==
- Human impact on the environment
- List of environmental issues
- List of years in the environment
