= 1967 in the environment =

This is a list of notable events relating to the environment in 1967. They relate to environmental law, conservation, environmentalism and environmental issues.

== Events ==
- A number of protected areas were established in 1967, including Huerquehue National Park in Chile, Jip Jip National Park in Australia, and Minalungao National Park in the Philippines.

== See also ==
- Human impact on the environment
- List of environmental issues
- List of years in the environment
