= 1988 in the environment =

This is a list of notable events relating to the environment in 1988. They relate to environmental law, conservation, environmentalism and environmental issues.

== Events ==
- The Flora and Fauna Guarantee Act 1988 is signed in the Australian state of Victoria. It is designed to protect species, genetic material and habitats, to prevent extinction and allow maximum genetic diversity within the state of Victoria for perpetuity and was the first Australian legislation to deal with such issues.

=== June ===
- Rats were eradicated from Breaksea Island, New Zealand after a successful trial on the smaller Hāwea Island.

=== September ===
- The Vienna Convention for the Protection of the Ozone Layer enters into force.
- The China–Australia Migratory Bird Agreement between Australia and China come into force. It is to minimise harm to the major areas used by birds which migrate between the two countries.

=== November ===
- US president Ronald Reagan signed the Medical Waste Tracking Act.

=== December ===
- Chico Mendes, a Brazilian conservationist and advocate for human rights, is killed by a rancher.

== See also ==
- Human impact on the environment
- List of environmental issues
- List of years in the environment
