= 2018 in the environment =

This is a list of notable events relating to the environment in 2018. They relate to environmental law, conservation, environmentalism and environmental issues.

== Events ==
- Ongoing – Climate change litigation
- February 9 - The United States Bipartisan Budget Act of 2018 is signed into law, which includes environmental disaster relief.
- April 13 – 2018 Hawaii floods: Heavy rainfall on the islands of Kauaʻi and Oʻahu causes widespread flash flooding and landslides, resulting in $125 million in property damage.
- June 6 to October 6 - 2018 Utah wildfires burn down thousands of acres of forest, leading to at least one lawsuit.
- June 15 – the Australian Kosciuszko Wild Horse Heritage Act 2018 (NSW) given assent.
- October 28 – the America's Water Infrastructure Act of 2018 is signed into law.
- December 18 - EU enacts the Electronic Communications Code Directive 2018.

== See also ==
- Human impact on the environment
- List of environmental issues
- List of years in the environment
