= 1952 in the environment =

This is a list of notable events relating to the environment in 1952. They relate to environmental law, conservation, environmentalism and environmental issues.

Before the environmental movement, the most common phrase used for this concept was "environmental conservation".

== Events ==
- The last sighting of the Caribbean monk seal was in 1952, now presumably extinct.
- Michigan Nature Association was founded.
- A number of Protected areas were established in 1952, including the Bir Bunerheri Wildlife Sanctuary, in Punjab, India, and Sierra Nevada National Park (Venezuela).

== December ==
- The Great Smog of London occurs 5 to 12 December 1952, killing thousands of people.

== See also ==
- Human impact on the environment
- List of environmental issues
- List of years in the environment
