= 1977 in the environment =

This is a list of notable events relating to the environment in 1977. They relate to environmental law, conservation, environmentalism and environmental issues.

== Events ==
- The World Network of Biosphere Reserves was started.

=== September ===
- The Venpet-Venoil collision occurred in dense fog off the coast of South Africa. The Venoil ploughed into the Venpet, eventually leading to the spilling of approximately 26,600–30,500 tonnes of crude oil.

=== December ===
- The Reserves Act 1977 is passed in New Zealand.

== See also ==
- Human impact on the environment
- List of environmental issues
- List of years in the environment
