= 1973 in the environment =

This is a list of notable events relating to the environment in 1973. They relate to environmental law, conservation, environmentalism and environmental issues.

== Events ==
- E. F. Schumacher publishes Small Is Beautiful.
- Jacques Cousteau founds the Cousteau Society.
- A number of protected areas were established in 1973, including the Essex Region of Western Ontario, Canada.

=== March ===
- World Conservation Union (IUCN) meeting drafts the Convention on International Trade in Endangered Species of Wild Fauna and Flora (CITES), which starts being signed on 3 March 1973.

=== Summer ===
- Several thousand pounds of polybrominated biphenyls were accidentally mixed with livestock feed that was distributed to farms in Michigan, because the plant also produced a feed precursor ingredient, magnesium oxide, which was sold to the feed manufacturer. Adverse reproductive-system effects continued 40 years later to be found in the grandchildren of those who consumed tainted farm products.

=== August ===
- The snail darter controversy delayed the construction of the Tellico Dam on the Little Tennessee River in the United States when the snail darter fish was discovered in the river.
- An earthquake of 7.1 magnitude strikes Veracruz, Mexico on August 28, causing extensive damage to buildings and the environment, killing at least 600 people.

=== November ===
- The International Agreement on the Conservation of Polar Bears was signed in Oslo, Norway.

=== December ===
- The Endangered Species Act was signed into law in the United States by President Richard Nixon. This mandated the first Habitat Conservation Plans.

== See also ==
- Human impact on the environment
- List of environmental issues
- List of years in the environment
