= 1999 in the environment =

This is a list of notable events relating to the environment in 1999. They relate to environmental law, conservation, environmentalism and environmental issues.

== Events ==
- The GEO-2000 is published. It is part of the Global Environment Outlook project.
- The Dioxin Affair, primarily a political crisis, occurred in Belgium during the spring of 1999 due to contamination of feedstock with polychlorinated biphenyls (PCBs). It was detected in animal food products, mainly eggs and chickens.
- The uninhabited islands of Abanuea and Tebua Tarawa in Kiribati disappear beneath the waves as a result of rising sea levels.

=== July ===
- The Environment Protection and Biodiversity Conservation Act 1999 is passed in Australia. It provides a framework for protection of the Australian environment, including its biodiversity and its natural and culturally significant places.
- The Memorandum of Understanding concerning Conservation Measures for Marine Turtles of the Atlantic Coast of Africa comes into force.

=== December ===
- The MV Erika sank off the coast of France creating a major oil spill.

== See also ==
- Human impact on the environment
- List of years in the environment
