= 1927 in the environment =

This is a list of notable events relating to the environment in 1927. They relate to environmental law, conservation, environmentalism and environmental issues.

== Events ==
- The Great Mississippi Flood of 1927 occurred, due in part to the denuding of the Southern landscape, causing widespread and costly damage and the displacement of hundreds of thousands of people, the vast majority of whom were African Americans.
- The last known specimen of the Syrian wild ass was shot.
- The last of the European bison in the Western Caucasus were shot.

September

- The last confirmed sighting of the Australian paradise parrot was made and it is now considered to be extinct.
- The Indian Forest Act, 1927 is passed 21 September 1927.

== See also ==
- Human impact on the environment
- List of environmental issues
- List of years in the environment
