= 1976 in the environment =

This is a list of notable events relating to the environment in 1976. They relate to environmental law, conservation, environmentalism and environmental issues.

== Events ==
- Ongoing oil spills start in Nigeria leading to various environmental issues in the Niger Delta.
- The Areas of Critical Environmental Concern, a conservation ecology program in the western United States managed by the Bureau of Land Management (BLM), is established. The program was conceived in the 1976 Federal Land Policy and Management Act, which established the first conservation ecology mandate for the BLM

=== June ===
- The NEPCO 140 Oil Spill took place near Clayton, New York when the NEPCO 140 ran aground while traveling inland, spilling an estimated 300,000 US gallons (1,100 m^{3}) of oil into the Saint Lawrence River.

=== July ===
- The Seveso disaster was an industrial accident that occurred in a small chemical manufacturing plant approximately 15 km (9.3 mi) north of Milan in the Lombardy region in Italy. It resulted in the highest known exposure to 2,3,7,8-tetrachlorodibenzo-p-dioxin (TCDD) in residential populations, which gave rise to numerous scientific studies and standardized industrial safety regulations.

=== October ===
- US President Gerald Ford signed the Toxic Substances Control Act, which regulates the introduction of new and existing chemicals.
- President Gerald Ford signed the Resource Conservation and Recovery Act, the principal Federal law in the United States governing the disposal of solid waste and hazardous waste.

== See also ==
- Human impact on the environment
- List of years in the environment
