= 2019 in the environment =

This is an article of notable issues relating to the environment in 2019. They relate to environmental law, conservation, environmentalism and environmental issues.

Christian Aid report December 2019 evaluated the costs of floods, fires and storms in 2019. Climate crisis was linked to at least 15 over 1 billion cost destructions in 2019.

== Statistics 2019 ==
- Year 2019 was Australia's hottest and driest year on record (National Bureau of Meteorology)
- Europe was 3.2 °C warmer in December 2019 than the standard reference period for December for 1981-2010 (The European Union's climate change monitoring agency, Copernicus)
- 2019 was second hottest year on record for the planet's surface. The five years 2015-2019 and the decade 2010-2019 were the hottest in 150 years. High temperature increase severe storms, floods, droughts and wildfires.
- The heat in the world's oceans reached a new record level in 2019. Oceans are clearest measure of climate crisis as they absorb 90% of heat trapped by greenhouse gases.

== Environmental issues ==
=== Plastic pollution ===
2019 was the year the worldwide revolt against Plastic pollution. Production and disposal of plastic used already nearly 14% of all the world's oil and gas. According to the International Energy Agency plastics annual carbon budget may become equivalent of the world's fifth largest climate heating country, emitting more than Germany or the UK. 359 m tonnes plastics were produced in 2018. Ca 8m tons plastic waste run to the sea via rivers. Since 2010 the petrochemical industry has invested about $200bn, and $100bn more is planned to be spent, plastic production is expected to grow 40% by 2030.

=== Sixth mass extinction ===
Sixth mass extinction: According to the first global scientific review of insects in February 2019 found that more than 40% of insect species are declining and a third are endangered. The rate of extinction is eight times faster than that of mammals, birds and reptiles. The total mass of insects is falling by a precipitous 2.5% a year.

In May 2019 was published biodiversity report, that pointed out the biodiversity to decline in threatening speed. It will be crisis to life of plants, animals and humans. IPBES reported that 25% of plant and animal species are threatened with extinction as the result of human activity.

=== Microplastics ===
In January 2019, the European Chemicals Agency (ECHA) proposed to restrict intentionally added microplastics.

== Events and news ==
March

Extreme weather includes Storm Eberhard across the Netherlands, Belgium and central Germany in Europe in March 2019.

Cyclone Idai killed 1,300 people in Zimbabwe, Mozambique and Malawi in March, 2019. It ranks as the second-deadliest tropical cyclone on record. The only system with a higher death toll is the 1973 Flores cyclone that killed 1,650 off the coast of Indonesia.

May

Cyclone Fani struck India and Bangladesh in May and June. A stronger than usual monsoon killed 1,900 people in India.

In May 2019 according to University of Bristol UK emissions of CFC-11 from north eastern China particularly in or around the provinces of Shandong and Hebei had increased by around 7,000 tons per year after 2013. A global ban on the use of CFCs has been in place since 2010 to prevent Ozone depletion.

August

Typhoon Lekima (2019) was the second costliest typhoon in Chinese history.

September

The typhoons Typhoon Faxai (2019) and Typhoon Hagibis (2019) in Japan in September and October 2019. Hurricane Dorian in the US east coast, killing 673 people. Hurricane Dorian was the most intense tropical cyclone on record to strike the Bahamas, and is regarded as the worst natural disaster in the country's history.

November

Venice Italy had the highest water levels for more than 50 years caused hundreds of millions of euros of possibly irreparable damage in Venice.

December

The 2019 United Nations Climate Change Conference was held in Madrid, Spain, from 2 to 13 December 2019.

2019 California wildfires had over $25bn cost in damage.

The Australian wildfires in December 2019 were intense. Record low rainfall contributed to a continent-scale emergency that burned more than 5 million hectares and alarmed scientists, doctors and firefighters. On 19 December 2019 average temperature maximum in Australia hit the record 41.9C. According to NASA Fires in New South Wales and Queensland emitted from August to December 306 million tons of carbon dioxide, which is more than half of Australia's total greenhouse gas footprint in 2018.

== See also ==
- Human impact on the environment
- List of environmental issues
- List of years in the environment
- 2019 Amazon rainforest wildfires
