= 1971 in the environment =

This is a list of notable events relating to the environment in 1971. They relate to environmental law, conservation, environmentalism and environmental issues.

== Events ==
- The Man and the Biosphere Programme was established by UNESCO to promote interdisciplinary approaches to management, research and education in ecosystem conservation and sustainable use of natural resources.
- Greenpeace is founded in Canada.
- A number of protected areas were established in 1971, including Arches National Park, Utah (previously a national monument), Bosco Nordio, Veneto, Italy, and Costa da Caparica Fossil Cliff Protected Landscape, Portugal.

=== January ===
- The 1971 San Francisco Bay oil spill occurred when two Standard Oil tankers, the Arizona Standard and the Oregon Standard, collided in the San Francisco Bay, resulting in an 800,000 US gallons (3,000,000 L) spill. It led to the formation of a number of environmental organizations.
- Marvin Gaye released What's Going On, which becomes a massive hit record and classic protest song. In June, he released his second single off of the same album, Mercy Mercy Me (The Ecology), which is even more explicit as an environmental statement.

=== February ===
- The SS Wafra oil spill occurred when the ship experienced engine trouble and subsequently ran around near Cape Agulhas, South Africa, spilling 200,000 barrels of crude oil.

=== July ===
- In the United States the Oregon Bottle Bill (HB 1036) is signed into law. It is the first such legislation to pass in the US

=== September ===
- The Marine Reserves Act 1971 was passed into law in New Zealand.

=== October ===
- The International Convention for the Prevention of Pollution of the Sea by Oil was amended to protect the Great Barrier Reef

== See also ==
- Human impact on the environment
- List of environmental issues
- List of years in the environment
