= Gamla Varberg =

Coordinates: 57°9′29.58″N 12°13′58.56″E

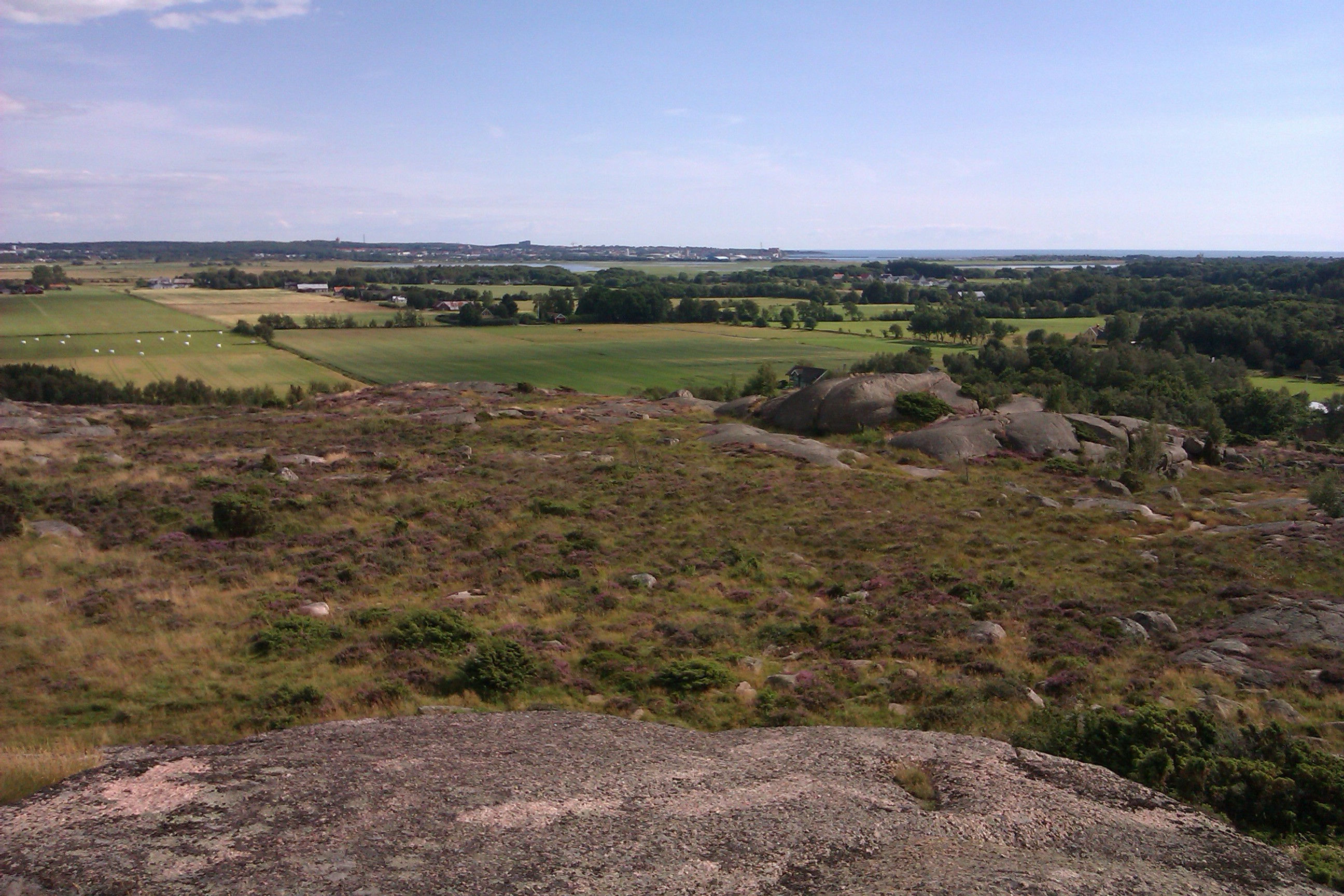
Gamla Varberg 2012 01

Gamla Varberg (Swedish: "Old Varberg") is a nature reserve in Varberg Municipality, Sweden. It was established in 1966.

The nature reserve consists of a hill with the same name and the surrounding area. It is located at the Kattegat. From the top of the hill, there is a beautiful view over the sea and the island Balgö. In earlier times, the hill worked as a beacon hill. On the top, there is a cairn from the Bronze Age.

For a long time, Gamla Varberg and its surroundings was a grazed outfield. In the area, there were only a few homesteads. In the 1950s, junipers began to grow in the area. In the 1990s, the junipers were removed and the landscape restored.

On the heathland at Gamla Varberg, there are species like devils-bit scabious, wild thyme, Pedicularis sylvatica, and marsh gentian. On the shore meadow at Kattegat, there are Armeria maritima, Trifolium fragiferum, shore arrowgrass, and Salicornia europaea. Inside the nature reserve, there are birds like the northern lapwing, common redshank, and Eurasian oystercatcher.
