= 1998 in the environment =

This is a list of notable events relating to the environment in 1998. They relate to environmental law, conservation, environmentalism and environmental issues.

== Events ==
=== March ===
- The Convention for the Protection of the Marine Environment of the North-East Atlantic is enacted.

=== April ===
- The Bamako Convention (in full - Bamako Convention on the ban on the Import into Africa and the Control of Transboundary Movement and Management of Hazardous Wastes within Africa) is enacted.
- The Doñana disaster, an industrial accident in Andalusia (southern Spain), occurred when a holding dam burst at the Los Frailes mine near Aznalcóllar (Seville Province). It released 4–5 million cubic metres of mine tailings.

=== June ===
- On 25 June, the Aarhus Protocol on Persistent Organic Pollutants was officially signed.

== See also ==
- Human impact on the environment
- List of environmental issues
- List of years in the environment
