= 1969 in the environment =

This is a list of notable events relating to the environment in 1969. They relate to environmental law, conservation, environmentalism and environmental issues.

== Events ==
- After several oil spills in Europe the Bonn Agreement was signed.
- The Council on Environmental Quality is established in the United States.
- Tom Winslow releases "Hey Looka Yonder (It's The Clear Water)", a folk song that has been the anthem of the Sloop Clearwater; it was the first environmental song by an African-American songwriter.
- René Dubos wins the Pulitzer Prize for So Human an Animal.

January

- The Santa Barbara oil spill occurred near Santa Barbara in Southern California in the United States.

June

- One of the many fires on the Cuyahoga River in Ohio spurs a number of environmental protection measures in the United States.

October

- Amendments to enhance the International Convention for the Prevention of Pollution of the Sea by Oil (OILPOL) were signed in London, 21 October 1969

December

- The Endangered Species Act of 1969 is enacted in the United States

== See also ==
- Human impact on the environment
- List of environmental issues
- List of years in the environment
