= 1985 in the environment =

This is a list of notable events relating to the environment in 1985. They relate to environmental law, conservation, environmentalism and environmental issues.

== Events ==
- The K5 Plan, also known as Bamboo Curtain, was an attempt between 1985 and 1989 by the government of the People's Republic of Kampuchea to seal Khmer Rouge guerrilla infiltration routes along virtually the entire Thai-Cambodian border. It had severe environmental effects.
- The Vienna Conference was held. It was the first international conference on ozone layer depletion.
- The 1983-1984 drought in the Sahel is relieved.
- A number of protected areas were established in 1985, including Atikaki Provincial Wilderness Park, Manitoba's first wilderness park, Bad Branch Falls State Nature Preserve in Kentucky, Central Siberia Nature Reserve, one of the largest strict preservation areas in the world, Darke Range Conservation Park in South Australia, Endla Nature Reserve in Estonia, and Floresta do Jacarandá Environmental Protection Area in Brazil.
- CREDO Mobile (formerly Working Assets Wireless), which has funded many environmental organizations, is founded in San Francisco.

=== April ===
- The International Tropical Timber Agreement enters into force.

=== July ===
- The sinking of the Rainbow Warrior occurred in New Zealand. It was committed by French government DGSE agents to prevent it from taking part in protests over nuclear testing at Moruroa.

== See also ==
- Human impact on the environment
- List of years in the environment
