= List of years in the environment =

This is a list of years in the environment. The subjects relate to environmental law, conservation, environmentalism and environmental issues.

Some of the more notable events are listed here with a full list on the respective pages.

== List of years ==
=== 1890s ===
- 1893 - Beaver Brook Reservation is established.

=== 1920s to 1930s ===
- 1927 - several species become extinct; the Great Mississippi Flood of 1927 is caused by a denuded landscape and causes extensive damage.
- 1928 - Huguette Clark donates money to Santa Barbara, California to create the Andree Clark Bird Refuge, in honor of her late sister.
- 1929 - Migratory Bird Conservation Act is enacted.

=== 1940s ===
- 1948

=== 1950s ===
- 1950
- 1951 - The Nature Conservancy, a major environmental nonprofit organization in the United States, was founded.
- 1952
- 1953
- 1954
- 1955
- 1956
- 1957
- 1958
- 1959

=== 1960s ===
- 1960 -
- 1961 -
- 1962 - Silent Spring, the widely acclaimed book by Rachel Carson which documented the effects of indiscriminate use of pesticides, is published.
- 1963 - The Clean Air Act is passed in the United States, with subsequent amendments in 1970, 1977 and 1990.
- 1964
- 1965
- 1966
- 1967
- 1968
- 1969

=== 1970s ===
- 1970 - The first Earth Day, on April 22, millions of people gather in the United States for the first Earth Day organized by Gaylord Nelson, former senator of Wisconsin, and Denis Hayes, Harvard graduate student.
- 1971
- 1972 - The Limits to Growth was published. The book is about the computer modelling of unchecked economic and population growth with finite resource supplies, and became both controversial and influential.
- 1973 - the Endangered Species Act of 1973 is enacted, mandating Habitat Conservation Plans.
- 1974
- 1975
- 1976 - Ongoing oil spills began in Nigeria leading to various environmental issues in the Niger Delta.
- 1977
- 1978 - The Amoco Cadiz oil spill occurred on the coast of Brittany resulting in the largest oil spill of its kind in history to that date.
- 1979 - The Three Mile Island accident, a partial nuclear meltdown that released radioactive material, occurred in the United States.

=== 1980s ===
- 1980
- 1981
- 1982
- 1983
- 1984
- 1985 - the International Tropical Timber Agreement enters into force.
- 1986 - the Chernobyl disaster, a catastrophic nuclear accident, occurred at the Chernobyl Nuclear Power Plant in Ukraine
- 1987
- 1988 - the Vienna Convention for the Protection of the Ozone Layer enters into force.
- 1989 - the Exxon Valdez oil spill occurred in Prince William Sound, Alaska.

=== 1990s ===
- 1990
- 1991
- 1992
- 1993 - the Convention on Biological Diversity, known informally as the Biodiversity Convention, enters into force. It is an international legally binding treaty.
- 1994 - the United Nations Framework Convention on Climate Change (UNFCCC) enters into force.
- 1995
- 1996
- 1997
- 1998
- 1999

=== 2000s ===
- 2000
- 2001
- 2002 - the World Summit on Sustainable Development, WSSD or Earth Summit 2002 took place in Johannesburg, South Africa, from 26 August to 4 September 2002. It was convened to discuss sustainable development by the United Nations.
- 2003
- 2004
- 2005
- 2006
- 2007
- 2008
- 2009

=== 2010s ===
- 2010

- 2010 is declared to be the International Year of Biodiversity by the United Nations General Assembly.
- The Deepwater Horizon oil spill in the Gulf of Mexico flows unabated for three months.

- 2011 - 2011 was declared the International Year of Forests by the United Nations
- 2012
- 2013
- 2014
- 2015
- 2016
- 2017
- 2018
- 2019

=== 2020s ===
- 2020 – starting with 2020 these articles also include significant events in environmental sciences
- 2021
- 2022
- 2023
- 2024
- 2025
- 2026

== See also ==
- List of types of formally designated forests
- List of waste disposal incidents
- Timeline of environmental history
- Timeline of the history of environmentalism
