= 1960 in the environment =

This is a list of notable events relating to the environment in 1960. They relate to environmental law, conservation, environmentalism and environmental issues.

Before the environmental movement, the most common phrase used for this concept was "environmental conservation".

== Events ==
A number of environmental organizations experienced significant growth during the period 1960-1961, including the Sierra Club, National Audubon Society, and The Wilderness Society.

Sand mining begins at Vigie Beach, Saint Lucia, which worsened the effects of hurricanes and made "coastal resources management development" more difficult.

=== June ===
- Multiple-Use Sustained-Yield Act of 1960 was enacted on June 12, 1960.

=== September ===
- The Sikes Act was enacted September 15, 1960.

== See also ==
- Human impact on the environment
- List of environmental issues
- List of years in the environment
