= 2016 in the environment =

This is a list of notable events relating to the environment in 2016. They relate to environmental law, conservation, environmentalism and environmental issues.

== Events ==
- Preparation for the 2016 Summer Olympics in Rio de Janeiro included the integration of environmental elements into "Green Games for a Blue Planet" vision and planted 2386 seedlings to offset 716 tons of carbon emitted over the two years of the campaign.

=== April ===
- The National Waterways Act, 2016 of India enters into force on 12 April.

== See also ==
- Human impact on the environment
- List of environmental issues
- List of years in the environment
