= 2015 in the environment =

This is a list of notable events relating to the environment in 2015. They relate to environmental law, conservation, environmentalism and environmental issues.

== Events ==
- The eight Millennium Development Goals, agreed to in 2001 by all 193 United Nations member states and at least 23 international organizations, are set to be achieved.

March

- As of 31 March, Areas protected under the Nature Conservation Law of Japan reached five Wilderness Areas, ten Nature Conservation Areas, and 544 Prefectural Nature Conservation Areas.

April

May

- 24 May: publication of Pope Francis' encyclical letter, Laudato si', subtitled On Care for Our Common Home.

August

- 5 August - The EPA accidentally releases mine tailings from a Colorado dam, causing the 2015 Gold King Mine waste water spill.

== See also ==
- Human impact on the environment
- List of environmental issues
- List of years in the environment
