= 1987 in the environment =

This is a list of notable events relating to the environment in 1987. They relate to environmental law, conservation, environmentalism and environmental issues.

== Events ==
- The barge Mobro 4000 became infamous for hauling the same load of trash along the east coast of North America from New York to Belize and back until a way was found to dispose of the garbage.
- Our Common Future, also known as the Brundtland Report, was published by the United Nations World Commission on Environment and Development. It is the source of the often quoted definition of sustainable development as "development that meets the needs of the present without compromising the ability of future generations to meet their own needs."
- A number of protected areas were established in 1987, including Abubshahar Wildlife Sanctuary, the largest wildlife sanctuary in Haryana, India, Bilby Ranch Lake Conservation Area in Missouri, and Cerro Ñielol Natural Monument in Chile.

=== February ===
- The start of the "Phosphorite War", an environmental campaign in the then-Estonian Soviet Socialist Republic, against the opening of large phosphorite mines in the Virumaa region.

=== April ===
- The Conservation Act 1987, New Zealand's principal act concerning the conservation of indigenous biodiversity, becomes law. It established the Department of Conservation.

=== June ===
- The New Zealand Nuclear Free Zone, Disarmament, and Arms Control Act 1987 is passed in New Zealand.

=== September ===
- The Protocol to the 1979 Convention on Long-Range Transboundary Air Pollution on the Reduction of Sulphur Emissions or Their Transboundary Fluxes by at Least 30%, an agreement to provide for a 30% reduction in sulphur emissions or transboundary fluxes by 1993, enters into force.
- The Goiânia accident occurred in the Brazilian state of Goiás after an old radiotherapy source was stolen from an abandoned hospital site. It was subsequently handled by many people, resulting in four deaths. About 112,000 people were examined for radioactive contamination and 249 were found to have significant levels of radioactive material in or on their body. In the cleanup operation, topsoil had to be removed from several sites, and several houses were demolished.

== See also ==
- Human impact on the environment
- List of environmental issues
- List of years in the environment
