= 1984 in the environment =

This is a list of notable events relating to the environment in 1984. They relate to environmental law, conservation, environmentalism and environmental issues.

== Events ==
- The 1983-1984 drought in the Sahel occurs.
- A number of protected areas were established in 1984, including Cerro Hoya National Park in Panama, and Tabin Wildlife Reserve.

=== January ===
- The Eagle Mine in the U.S. state of Colorado was closed down. It was responsible for acid mine drainage polluting the Eagle River.

=== December ===
- The Bhopal disaster, considered one of the world's worst industrial catastrophes, occurred on the night of December 2–3 at the Union Carbide India Limited pesticide plant in Bhopal, Madhya Pradesh, India. A leak of methyl isocyanate gas and other chemicals from the plant resulted in the exposure of the gas to hundreds of thousands of people. Thousands of people died.

== See also ==
- Human impact on the environment
- List of environmental issues
- List of years in the environment
