= 1955 in the environment =

This is a list of notable events relating to the environment in 1955. They relate to environmental law, conservation, environmentalism and environmental issues.

Before the environmental movement, the most common phrase used for this concept was "environmental conservation".

== Events ==
- A number of Protected areas were established (or greatly expanded) in 1955, including Arcata Community Forest in California, Beaver Brook State Park in Connecticut, Champion Lakes Provincial Park in British Columbia, Canada, Rizal Park, Philippines, and Southwest National Park in Tasmania, Australia.

== June ==
- The Air Pollution Control Act of 1955 was signed by President Dwight D. Eisenhower.

== See also ==
- Human impact on the environment
- List of environmental issues
- List of years in the environment
