= 1974 in the environment =

This is a list of notable events relating to the environment in 1974. They relate to environmental law, conservation, environmentalism and environmental issues.

== Events ==
- A number of protected areas were established in 1974, including the Aiguilles Rouges National Nature Reserve in France.

=== Unknown ===
- The last confirmed record of the Japanese sea lion occurred.
- The World population reached 4 billion.

=== February ===
- The Convention for the Prevention of Marine Pollution by Dumping from Ships and Aircraft, also called the Oslo Convention, an international agreement designed to control the dumping of harmful substances from ships and aircraft into the sea, was passed.

=== August ===
- The VLCC Metula oil spill occurred in Tierra del Fuego, Chile.

=== October ===
- The Energy Reorganization Act of 1974 was passed in the United States.

=== December ===
- US president Gerald Ford signed the Safe Drinking Water Act.

== See also ==
- Human impact on the environment
- List of environmental issues
- List of years in the environment
