= 1957 in the environment =

This is a list of notable events relating to the environment in 1957. They relate to environmental law, conservation, environmentalism and environmental issues.

Before the environmental movement, the most common phrase used for this concept was "environmental conservation".

== Events ==
- Several Protected areas were established in 1957, including Fern Ridge Wildlife Area in Oregon, Holla Bend National Wildlife Refuge in Arkansas, and Tygarts State Forest in Kentucky.

=== September ===
- On 29 September, the Kyshtym disaster, also called the Mayak disaster or Ozyorsk disaster, resulted in the release of radioactive material near Ozyorsk, Chelyabinsk Oblast, Russia, then part of the Soviet Union.

== See also ==
- Human impact on the environment
- List of environmental issues
- List of years in the environment
