= Tasman Accord =

The Tasman Accord was signed in 1989 by Tasman Forestry Ltd, environmental groups and the Government. The company agreed to end native forest clearance on its land, protect about 39,000 hectares, and assist with the recovery programme for kōkako, as well as other conservation projects.

The main clauses in the agreement are:

- formal protection of 30,348 ha of freehold native forest;
- an end to all native forest clearance apart from commitments to supply tawa until 1990;
- the sale, for $1.5 million, of 3500 ha in the Mamaku Range to the Department of Conservation;
- a $150,000 grant for a three-year kokako research and management project;
- a commitment to further consultation on resource use and environmental issues.

Some of the land that is under protection is where the Arnold River drains Lake Brunner.

== See also ==
- Forestry in New Zealand
- Environment of New Zealand
