= 1997 in the environment =

This is a list of notable events relating to the environment in 1997. They relate to environmental law, conservation, environmentalism and environmental issues.

== Events ==
- 1997 Indonesian forest fires, caused mainly by slash-and-burn techniques adopted by farmers in Indonesia, burned for much of the year and into 1998, and was called "one of the century’s worst environmental disasters."
- 1997 Southeast Asian haze was a large-scale air quality disaster which occurred during the second half of 1997, caused in major part by the above event.
- The Convention on Environmental Impact Assessment in a Transboundary Context, a United Nations Economic Commission for Europe convention signed in Espoo, Finland, in 1991, entered into force.
- The Great Pacific Garbage Patch, a gyre of marine litter in the central North Pacific Ocean, is discovered.
- The 1997 Guanabara Bay oil spill occurred in Brazil, one of three major oil spills in the bay.
- The Kyoto Protocol, an international treaty which extended the 1992 United Nations Framework Convention on Climate Change, was signed December 11, 1997.
- A number of protected areas were established in 1997, including Antimary State Forest, Brazil, Bellinger River National Park in New South Wales, Australia, and Callaghan Lake Provincial Park in British Columbia, Canada.

=== January ===
- The International Tropical Timber Agreement, 1994 enters into force. It replaced the International Tropical Timber Agreement, 1983, and was superseded by the International Tropical Timber Agreement, 2006.

=== June ===
- A ruling was made largely in favour of McDonald's in the "McLibel Case" in the United Kingdom. The libel case was lodged over claims made in a pamphlet by two activists about the environmental effects, amongst other issues, of McDonald's business practices.
- Jacques Cousteau dies at the age of 87. As well as being the co-developer of the aqua-lung, he was a proponent of marine conservation especially through the use of television.

=== November ===
- The Protocol to the 1979 Convention on Long-Range Transboundary Air Pollution Concerning the Control of Emissions of Volatile Organic Compounds or Their Transboundary Fluxes enters into force. It is an agreement to provide for the control and reduction of emissions of volatile organic compounds in order to reduce their transboundary fluxes so as to protect human health and the environment from adverse effects.

== See also ==
- Human impact on the environment
- List of environmental issues
- List of years in the environment
