= 1963 in the environment =

This is a list of notable events relating to the environment in 1963. They relate to environmental law, conservation, environmentalism and environmental issues.

== Events ==
=== August ===
- The Partial Nuclear Test Ban Treaty is signed by the U.S., the U.K. and the U.S.S.R.

=== December ===
- US President Lyndon B. Johnson signed the Clean Air Act.

== See also ==
- Human impact on the environment
- List of years in the environment
