= 2004 in the environment =

This is a list of notable events relating to the environment in 2004. They relate to environmental law, conservation, environmentalism and environmental issues.

== Events ==
- The results of the Global Amphibian Assessment were published, the first worldwide assessment of amphibian populations. It found that 32% of species were globally threatened, at least 43% were experiencing some form of population decrease, and that between 9 and 122 species have become extinct since 1980. This decline in amphibian populations may be due in part to the effects of human activity.
- A number of protected areas were established in 2004, including Aketajawe-Lolobata National Park, in Indonesia, Blackwood River National Park in Western Australia and Camp Columbia State Park/State Forest in Connecticut.

=== January ===
- The Environmental Information Regulations 2004 come into force. It is a United Kingdom Statutory Instrument that provides a statutory right of access to environmental information held by UK public authorities.

=== February ===
- The Agreement on the Conservation of Albatrosses and Petrels comes into force.

=== May ===
- The Stockholm Convention on Persistent Organic Pollutants comes into force. It is an international environmental treaty that aims to eliminate or restrict the production and use of persistent organic pollutants (POPs).
- The judgement in the Monsanto Canada Inc. v. Schmeiser case is made. It is a leading Supreme Court of Canada case on patent rights for biotechnology. The court heard the question of whether growing genetically modified plants constitutes "use" of the patented invention of genetically modified plant cells. By a narrow 5–4 majority, the court ruled that it does. The case drew worldwide attention.
- Kaikoura Island in the Hauraki Gulf in New Zealand was purchased from private owners and established as an open sanctuary.

=== August ===
- The Berlin Rules on Water Resources document is adopted by the International Law Association to summarize international law customarily applied in modern times to freshwater resources, whether within a nation or crossing international boundaries.

=== November ===
- A male Po'o-uli dies of avian malaria at the Maui Bird Conservation Center in Olinda before it can breed, making the species in all probability extinct.

=== December ===
- State of Fear, a techno-thriller novel by Michael Crichton based on eco-terrorism, is published receiving widespread criticism from scientists, journalists and environmental groups.

== See also ==
- Human impact on the environment
- List of years in the environment
