= 2011 in the environment =

This is a list of notable events relating to the environment in 2011. They relate to environmental law, conservation, environmentalism and environmental issues.

== Events ==
- The year 2011 was declared the International Year of Forests by the United Nations to raise awareness and strengthen the sustainable management, conservation and sustainable development of all types of forests for the benefit of current and future generations.
- The Western Black Rhinoceros is declared extinct by the IUCN after not being sighted since 2006.
- Hydraulic fracturing is banned in France and concerns are raised in other countries.

=== January ===
- US president Barack Obama signed the Shark Conservation Act. The law amended the High Seas Driftnet Fishing Moratorium Protection Act and the Magnuson–Stevens Fishery Conservation and Management Act to improve the conservation of sharks.

=== March ===
- The Fukushima Daiichi nuclear disaster is a series of equipment failures, nuclear meltdowns, and releases of radioactive materials at the Fukushima I Nuclear Power Plant, following the Tōhoku earthquake and tsunami on 11 March 2011. It is the largest nuclear disaster since the Chernobyl disaster of 1986.

=== April ===
- Little Buffalo oil spill in Alberta, Canada.

=== June ===
- Bohai Bay oil spill in the Yellow Sea.
- The Nahal Zin fuel leak occurred when a backhoe loader struck and ruptured an underground fuel pipeline in southern Israel.

=== August ===
- A series of demonstrations began by indigenous peoples in Bolivia who opposed the construction of the Villa Tunari – San Ignacio de Moxos Highway through the Isiboro Sécure National Park and Indigenous Territory, the ancestral lands of over 12,000 indigenous residents, from the Chimane, Yuracaré, and Mojeño-Trinitario peoples.

=== September ===
- The Zhejiang solar panel plant protest occurred over three days at Zhejiang Jinko Solar company in Haining City, Zhejiang province of China due to fears about pollution from the factory contaminating the local environment.
- Birdlife Cyprus estimate over 300,000 birds are illegally trapped, using mist nets and lime-sticks in Cyprus during the first two weeks of September. Estimate rises to one million for the period 1 September to 23 October.

=== October ===
- Rena oil spill in New Zealand after the MV Rena ran aground.

=== November ===
- The 2011 United Nations Climate Change Conference was held in Durban, South Africa, from 28 November to 11 December 2011 to establish a new treaty to limit carbon emissions.

=== December ===
- An oil spill occurred at the Bonga Field in Nigeria of up to 40,000 barrels, or 1.68 million gallons. It resulted in a 923 square kilometre oil slick.
- The International Tropical Timber Agreement, 2006 enters into force.

== See also ==
- Human impact on the environment
- List of environmental issues
- List of years in the environment
