= 2005 in the environment =

This is a list of notable events relating to the environment in 2005. They relate to environmental law, conservation, environmentalism and environmental issues.

== Events ==
- The Millennium Ecosystem Assessment is released. It is an international synthesis by over 1000 of the world's leading biological scientists that analyses the state of the Earth’s ecosystems and provides summaries and guidelines for decision-makers. It concludes that human activity is having a significant and escalating impact on the biodiversity of world ecosystems, reducing both their resilience and biocapacity.
- The Singapore Green Plan 2012 was reviewed and was adopted the following year.

=== February ===
- The Kyoto Protocol comes into force.

=== May ===
- The Multi-effect Protocol, also known as the Gothenburg Protocol, comes into force. It is a multi-pollutant protocol designed to reduce acidification, eutrophication and ground-level ozone.

=== June ===
- An International Whaling Commission meeting was held in Ulsan, South Korea.

=== July ===
- The Asia-Pacific Partnership on Clean Development and Climate, an international, voluntary, public-private partnership among Australia, Canada, India, Japan, the People's Republic of China, South Korea, and the United States, was announced at an Association of South East Asian Nations (ASEAN) Regional Forum meeting.
- A writ was filed in Victoria, Australia by the forestry company Gunns against the "Gunns 20", a group of 20 individuals who were critical of their environmental practices.
- Gaylord Nelson, an American politician and founder of Earth Day, dies at the age of 89.

=== August ===
- The Malaysian haze was a week-long choking smog-like haze over Malaysia that almost brought the central part of Peninsular Malaysia to a standstill, prompted crisis talks with Indonesia and caused widespread inconvenience. The haze was at its worst on August 11, 2005 and was related to the haze crisis which last hit Malaysia in September 1997.
- The Murphy Oil USA refinery spill occurred as a result of the failure of a storage tank at the Murphy Oil USA refinery and spoiled the flood-waters following the levee breaks of Hurricane Katrina in residential areas of Chalmette and Meraux, Louisiana.
- US president George W. Bush signed the Energy Policy Act of 2005. The law exempted fluids used in the natural gas extraction process of hydraulic fracturing (fracking) from protections under the Clean Air Act, Clean Water Act and the Safe Drinking Water Act. It also greatly increased ethanol production.

=== November ===
- The Jilin chemical plant explosions occurred in Jilin City, Jilin Province in China, over the period of an hour. The explosions killed six, injured dozens, and caused the evacuation of tens of thousands of residents. The blasts created an 80 km long toxic slick in the Songhua River, a tributary of the Amur. The slick, predominantly made up of benzene and nitrobenzene, passed through the Amur River over subsequent weeks.

== See also ==
- Human impact on the environment
- List of years in the environment
