= CORA dataset =

Oceanographic temperature and salinity dataset

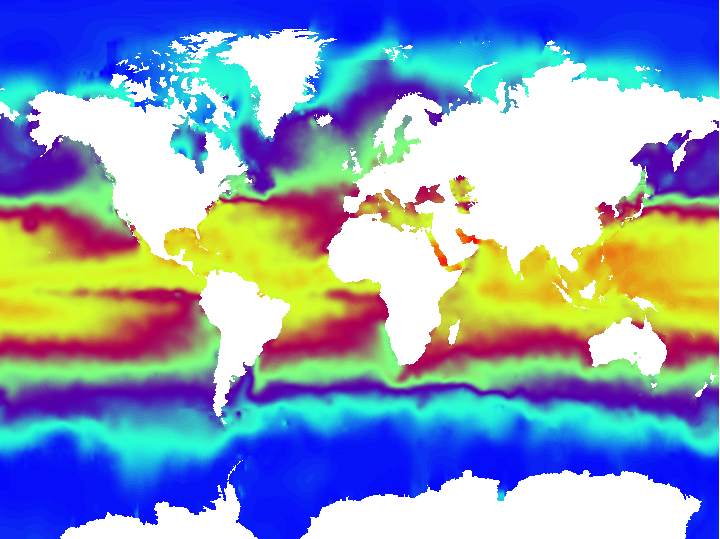
CORA3.2 2010 July Sea Surface Temperature

CORA (standing for Coriolis Ocean database ReAnalysis) is a global oceanographic temperature and salinity dataset produced and maintained by the French institute IFREMER. Most of those data are real-time data coming from different types of platforms such as research vessels, profilers, underwater gliders, drifting buoys, moored buoys, sea mammals and ships of opportunity.

== Description ==
This in-situ dataset produced by the French institute Ifremer in the framework of the European project MyOcean and French project CORIOLIS is a picture of the content of the operational oceanographic database CORIOLIS. This database is the main tool of Coriolis project which is a global data assembly center of in situ data: such as US-GODAE centre of Monterey in California. The latest version of CORA product is v5.2, it covers the years 1950 up to 2024 and has been released in May 2024. Observations are profiles distributed on measured levels (pressure or depth) and organized by dates of measurement and type of platform. Main users of CORA dataset are ocean modelers who needs to constraint and initialize their model. CORA is free of access and can be download via Copernicus Marine Service https://data.marine.copernicus.eu/product/INSITU_GLO_PHY_TS_DISCRETE_MY_013_001/description in netCDF file format. The main different of CORA dataset with other available datasets is that CORA provides data at depth levels where measurements were made rather than at standard levels such as in World Ocean Atlas or ENACT3. In addition data in CORA are retrieved from Coriolis database where each profile is visually checked by specialist operators if suspicious.

== Validation procedure ==
=== Validation in database ===
- duplicate observation check
- automatic checks (spikes, climatology, monotonic depth, valid date/position,...)
- objective analysis (ISAS software with 21 days, 300 km covariance ray): suspicious observations are visualized by an operator

=== Validation post extraction ===
- second duplicate observation check (detection and choice parameters tuned)
- refined climatological test
- XBT depth correction
- second objective analysis with tuned parameters: anomalies are visualized
- ARGO special diagnostics

== Data sources ==
The CORA dataset is designed for operational oceanography, so most global real time monitoring networks are plugged into this database. The data sources are the following:

- ARGO (autonomous drifting profilers)
- The global network of moored buoys comprising the TAO/TRITON, PIRATA and RAMA arrays
- EGO (underwater gliders)
- GTSPP (channel of real-time data distribution maintained by the US institute NOAA)
- GOSUD thermosalinograph data coming from opportunity ships
- GTS (BATHY, TESSAC, drifting buoys messages) channel of low resolution data distribution
- Sea mammals equipped with sensors (seals and sea elephants)
- other datasets integrated in delayed-time (CTD, XBT, oceanographic cruises,...)

== Versions ==
official versions of CORA productprofiles extracted from the EN4 dataset and validated
	Date of release	Time span	Comments
CORA1.0	2007	2002-2006	Beta version of the dataset, full years extracted
CORA2.2	2009	1990-2008	Add of validation procedures (climatological checks) and gridding of the data
CORA3.1	2010	1990-2009	Full years updated + 2009 added
CORA3.2	2011	1990-2010	Add of validation procedures (duplicate check, XBT depth correction) integration of sea mammals data, automatisation of the update procedure
CORA3.3	2012	1990-2011	Article submitted to Ocean Science review, add of year 2011, completion of anomalies feedback from objective analysis towards CORA dataset and Coriolis database.
CORA3.4	2013	1990-2011	New ICES CTD data added
CORA4.0	2014	1990-2012	Update of profiles and addition of Time series from drifters, ferrybox, profilers.
CORA4.1	2015	1950-1989 (Extraction from EN4), 1990-2013	
CORA4.2	2016	1950-1989 (Extraction from EN4), 1990-2014	
CORA5.0	2017	1950-2015	
CORA5.1	2018	1950-2016	
CORA5.2	2019	1950-ongoing	
CORA5.2	2023	1950-ongoing	
CORA5.2	2024	1950-ongoing	
