= 2001 in the environment =

This is a list of notable events relating to the environment in 2001. They relate to environmental law, conservation, environmentalism and environmental issues.

== Events ==
- The IPCC Third Assessment Report is released.
- ACCOBAMS, the Agreement on the Conservation of Cetaceans in the Black Sea, Mediterranean Sea and contiguous Atlantic area, comes into force. It is a cooperative tool for the conservation of marine biodiversity in the Mediterranean and Black Seas.
- The Skeptical Environmentalist: Measuring the Real State of the World, a controversial book by Bjørn Lomborg, is published in the English language. In the book Lomborg claims that various environmental issues are not supported by data.
- The Black Book of Corporations is published. In the book, Austrian journalists Klaus-Werner Lobo and Hans Weiss show that many multinational corporations are connected with environmental pollution.
- Campbell Island, New Zealand is declared rat free, nearly 200 years after their introduction.
- The Coriolis project is started in France to coordinate oceanography research.
- Euroleague for Life Sciences is founded by leading universities.

=== January ===
- The MV Jessica oil spill occurred off the coast of the Galápagos Islands.

=== May ===
- The Jinkanpo Atsugi Incinerator is purchased by the Japanese government and shut down. Throughout its history, the incinerator reportedly blew toxic and cancerous emissions over the high-rise dwellings in its immediate vicinity.

=== June ===
- The 2010 Biodiversity Target was adopted by the EU heads of state. It was an overall conservation target aiming to halt the decline of biodiversity by the end of 2010. The world largely failed to meet the target.

=== July ===
- The Report of the Royal Commission on Genetic Modification was published in New Zealand.

=== September ===
- The Memorandum of Understanding on the Conservation and Management of Marine Turtles and their Habitats of the Indian Ocean and South-East Asia comes into effect.

=== October ===
- The UNECE Convention on Access to Information, Public Participation in Decision-making and Access to Justice in Environmental Matters, usually known as the Aarhus Convention, enters into force.

=== December ===
- Tosontsengel, Zavkhan Province, Mongolia, observes on 19 December the highest recorded mean sea level pressure of 1,085.7 hectopascals or 32.06 inches of mercury or 814.34 millimetres of mercury, beating the previous record of 1,083.8 hectopascals (32.00 inHg; 812.92 mmHg) in Agata, Krasnoyarsk Krai in 1968.

== See also ==
- Human impact on the environment
- List of years in the environment
