= Threats to sea turtles =

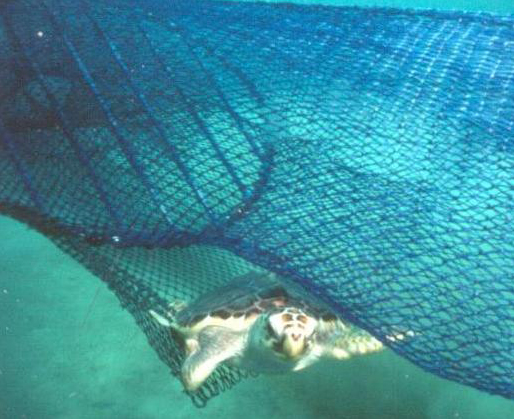
Loggerhead sea turtle escapes from fishing net through a turtle excluder device (TED)

Threats to sea turtles are numerous and have caused many sea turtle species to be endangered. Of the seven extant species of sea turtles, six in the family Cheloniidae and one in the family Dermochelyidae, all are listed on the IUCN Red List of Endangered Species. The list classifies six species of sea turtle as "threatened", two of them as "critically endangered", one as "endangered" and three as "vulnerable". The flatback sea turtle is classified as "data deficient" which means that there is insufficient information available for a proper assessment of conservation status. Although sea turtles usually lay around one hundred eggs at a time, on average only one of the eggs from the nest will survive to adulthood. While many of the things that endanger these hatchlings are natural, such as predators including sharks, raccoons, foxes, and seagulls, many new threats to the sea turtle species are anthropogenic.

== Artificial lighting ==
Artificial lighting is a threat to adult and hatchling sea turtles. Sea turtles use the brightest horizon as a guide to the ocean. This was created by celestial lights reflecting off the ocean's surface. With human development along the coast, artificial light sources are growing in abundance. Unfortunately, these human-made lights are brighter than celestial lights, causing sea turtles to move toward them. A sea turtle not going in the direction of the ocean is referred to as a disorientation event. Disorientations lead to an increased risk of predation, exhaustion, dehydration, and/or injury. These events are often fatal. Disorientations can be caused by any light source that is directly or indirectly seen from the beach. Also, heavily lit beaches may cause an adult to have a false crawl – when the female decides the beach is not suitable for her nest and goes back to the water. False crawls cause exhaustion for the adult and may lead to her releasing her eggs in the ocean, which is fatal to all the eggs.

As awareness of the negative impact artificial lighting has on sea turtles has grown, there have been several large-scale conservation efforts by Marine Life programs and conservation groups to educate the public on turtle conservation. Communities situated on or near a beach have been warned of the effects excessive lighting has on sea turtles and there have been substantial attempts to darken beaches and replace harmful artificial lighting with turtle-safe lights. Coastal communities have also been creating and updating their lighting ordinances with the common goal to help save sea turtles. Lighting ordinances allow local governments to enforce safer lighting for sea turtles.

== Magnetic interference ==
Ferrous metal wire mesh screens are commonly used to protect sea turtle nests from predators' excavating and devouring the eggs and hatchlings. A new concern is that nestlings' delicate magnetic sense may not develop normally in the presence of the magnetic field interference from these steel mesh cages. The effects of the use of steel mesh as a cage material may not be known for many years until assessments can be made of the success rate of the first adult populations that developed within such cages begin attempting landfall for nest-making. Gravid turtles or their hatchlings may also be affected by the presence of magnetic fields arising from power cables, iron debris, steel seawalls or other human activities that locally modify Earth's magnetic field.

== Oil spills and marine pollution ==
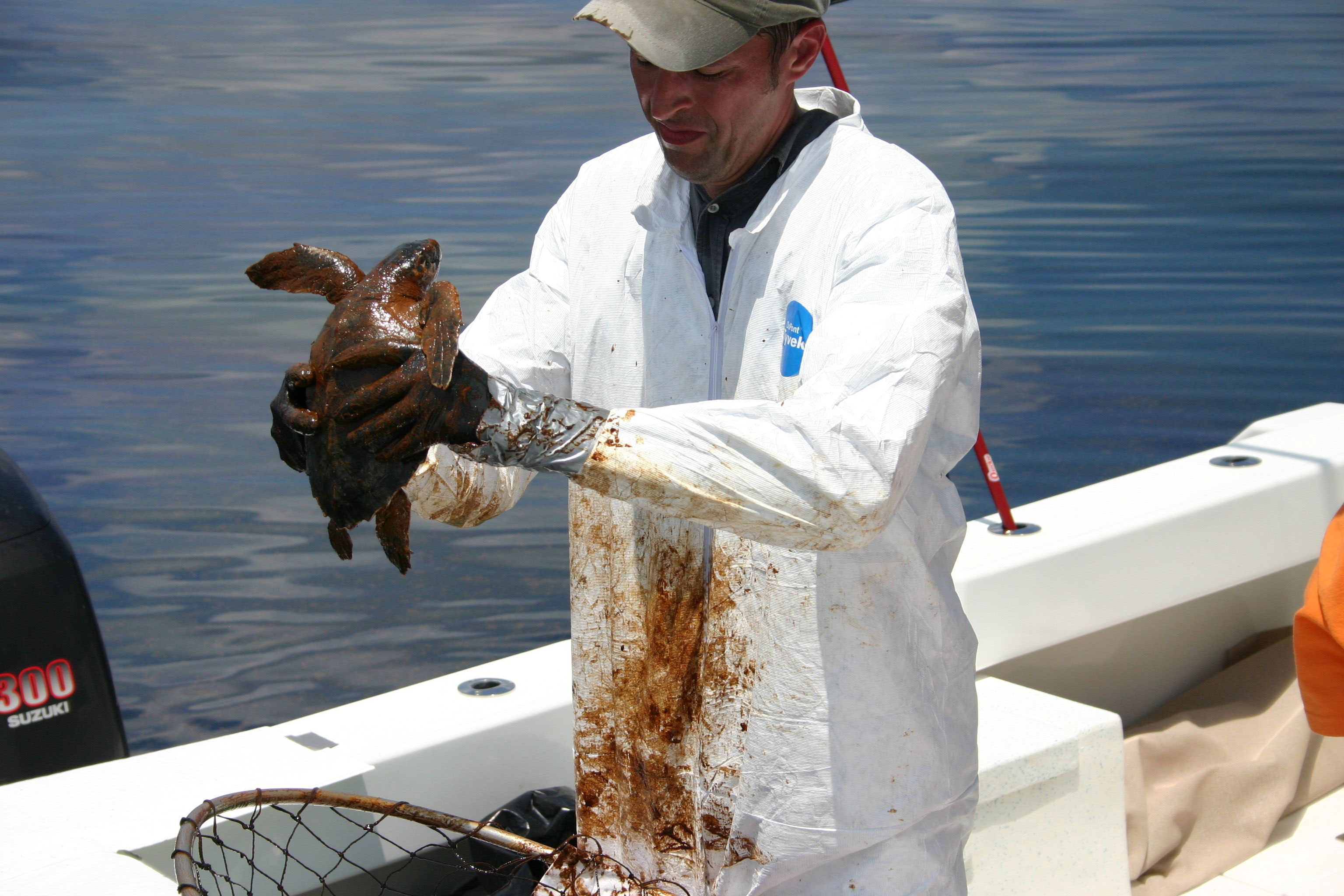
An oiled Kemp's ridley sea turtle

Marine pollution is both directly harmful to sea turtles as well as indirectly, through the deterioration of their natural habitats. Some of the most dangerous ocean pollutants include toxic metals, PCBs, fertilizers, untreated waste, chemicals, and a variety of petroleum products. Oil spills are particularly dangerous to sea turtles. Although oil does not tend to stick to them as it does to other marine life, sea turtles are still at risk when they surface for air, where oil can get in their eyes, skin, and lungs, which can lead to significant health problems. Even if they are not directly in contact with marine pollution, sea turtles can still ingest harmful chemicals through the food they eat. Oil is also a cause for the death of seagrass, which is a staple in the diet of the green turtle. The diets of the hawksbill sea turtle, loggerhead sea turtle, and Kemp's ridley sea turtle species have also been affected by the oil's role in the reduction of certain sponges and invertebrates. Extended exposure has been found to deteriorate the health of a sea turtle in general, making it more weak and vulnerable to a variety of other threats.

According to the Sea Turtle Conservancy, formerly known as the Caribbean Conservation Program, the migration habits of sea turtles increase their exposure to marine pollution at each of the stages of their lives including eggs, hatchlings, juveniles, sub adults, or nesting adults. In a 1994 study off of Florida's Atlantic coast, 63% of hatchlings surveyed were found to have ingested tar. Loggerheads in particular have been shown to have the most problems with tarball ingestion, leading to esophageal swelling that can dislocate the intestines and liver leading to serious buoyancy issues as well as excessive swelling. Many regions heavily associated with oil, either exploration, transportation, or processing, are also significant sea turtle environments, including the Gulf of Mexico and the Caribbean, and particularly the coasts of Texas and Florida. Sea turtles existing in the exact areas where oil spills occur are not the only ones at risk due to the strong and far reaching ocean currents which can move pollution to great distances from its derivation.

Breeding season is in particular a dangerous time for sea turtles due to the pollution of beach nesting sites. Contamination of their diet can lead to disruption of digestion as well as physical injury to the sea turtles' digestive tracts. The nesting of female sea turtles is often deterred due to the potential of oily effluence. If the female does lay eggs, the development of the eggs is at risk due to either oil in the sand or contamination from the mother turtle that was oiled while nesting. If the eggs in the nest have contact with oil while in the last half of their incubation phase, the rate of hatchling survival sharply decreases and those that do survive have a greater chance of physical deformities.

== Ocean plastic ==
Eight million tons of plastic make their way to the ocean every year. For many marine species, including sea turtles, plastics in our oceans can lead to threats of entanglement, habitat degradation, and ingestion. Discarded plastic bags floating in the ocean resemble jellyfish, a common food of sea turtles. If a turtle eats a plastic bag, it tends to clog the turtle's digestive system and result in the animal dying. There have been many cases of dissection showing plastic and other debris inside turtles' stomachs and intestines. Marine debris has caused mortality in all species of sea turtles. There have also been cases where sea turtles have been found with plastic straws in their noses, plastic bags or toothbrushes in their stomachs, or fish hooks stuck on their flippers. Plastic straws can be dangerous to sea turtles, too, because they are often mistaken for food. This can cause the sea turtle to choke or die of starvation because they feel full and do not eat, when they are actually full of plastic. Despite being small, plastic straws are among the top items that pollute the ocean. As previously mentioned, ingestion is also more likely to occur if the plastic resembles their typical food. Studies have found that turtles had a 50% chance of dying if they ingested more than fourteen pieces of plastic

== Tourism ==
Owing to the popularity of numerous sea turtle species, people often travel to areas where the turtles nest, live to observe and photograph them. This has resulted in numerous deaths of the turtles through boat collisions, tourists attempting to catch or steal individuals, and other incidents. In Costa Rica, tourists have recently been criticised for interfering with the nesting habits of the resident olive ridley sea turtles, disrupting and confusing the animals by attempting to take selfies with them. Many baby turtle release events occur during the day in various locations, which increases the risk of predation.

== Boats ==
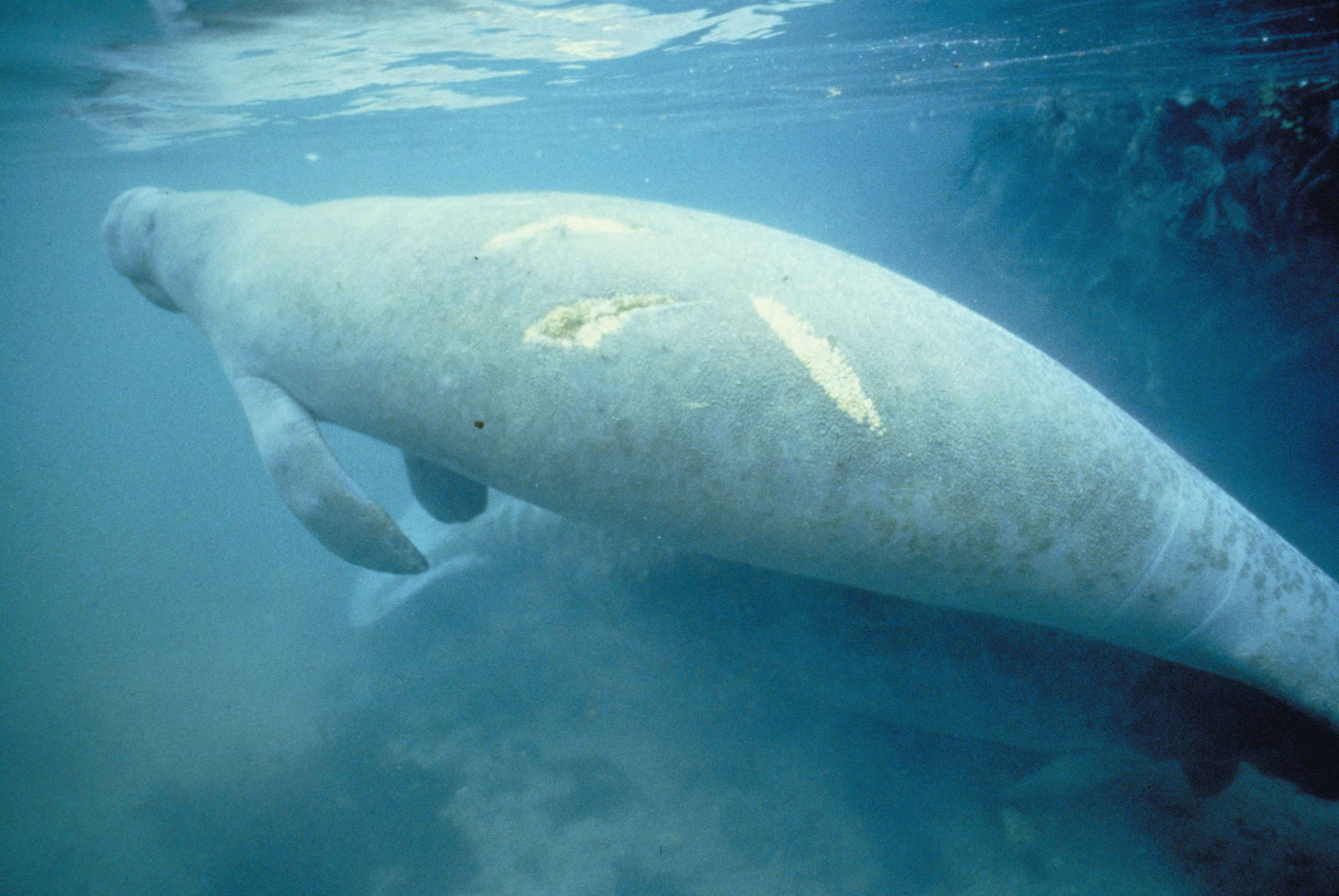
Image of a manatee with boat strike injuries. Similar injuries occur on turtle with parallel cuts (as shown in the image) or by blunt force trauma.

There are numerous threats to sea turtles associated with boats, including oil spills, habitat degradation, and vessel collisions. Boat strike injuries result in two types of injuries: blunt force trauma and propeller slices in the carapace. Blunt force trauma is from the hull of the boat hitting the turtle and results in a cracking, less obvious, injury on the turtle's carapace. Propeller strikes form clear cut, parallel lines on the carapace of the turtle. The propeller wounds can cut into the spinal cord or lungs if deep enough, as these are located dorsally on the animal attached to the underside of the carapace. Sea turtle stranding data is the primary method of quantifying boat strike injuries, which has increased by 20% in Florida between 1985 and 2005. In general, sea turtles are not able to avoid boat collisions when boats are travelling too quickly. Also, the faster a boat is travelling the more damage is done to the turtle, making incidents more lethal. When sea turtles surface to breathe they continue swimming in the water column just below the surface; this allows them to get a few breaths in at a time, and then dive into deeper water to hunt or forage. This depth is the ideal depth for the propeller of the boat to hit the turtle, it also makes it even more difficult for boaters to try to avoid the turtles, since they cannot be seen.

There are ways to mitigate the problem. Speed reduction zones have been beneficial for species such as the Florida manatee. These zones would be especially important implemented in shallow, coastal regions near popular nesting beaches during nesting season. Vessel modification are another way that boaters can reduce their influence on marine life. Jet board motors have an impeller that eliminates the threat of propeller damage to marine turtles. The motor rests only a few inches from the hull of the boat, meaning it is less likely to hit turtles that are not surfacing to breathe. Propeller guards are slightly helpful at idle speeds, but once a boat begins to reach higher planning speeds they are ineffective in protecting the turtle from the propeller.

Sea turtles that strand alive with boat injuries can be treated at rehabilitation facilities. Treatment is not always successful, but there are turtles that do survive boat strike injuries.

== Fishing ==
According to a study published in Conservation Letters, over 8 million sea turtles died between 1990 and 2010 due to injuries caused by being accidentally caught by fishing boats. Fisheries often use large-scale nets and hook systems that are indiscriminate and catch whatever comes along, be it sea turtle, dolphin, or even shark. What is known as "bycatch" is a large contributor to sea turtle deaths, as seen in Baja California. Longline, trawl, and gillnet fishing are three types of fishing with the most sea turtle accidents. Deaths occur often because of drowning, where the sea turtle was ensnared and could not come up for air. Another dangerous aspect of fishing that is common is when sea turtles inadvertently swallow sharp hooks, which can get stuck within the soft tissue of the throat and stomach, or damage vital organs and intestines.

== Poaching ==
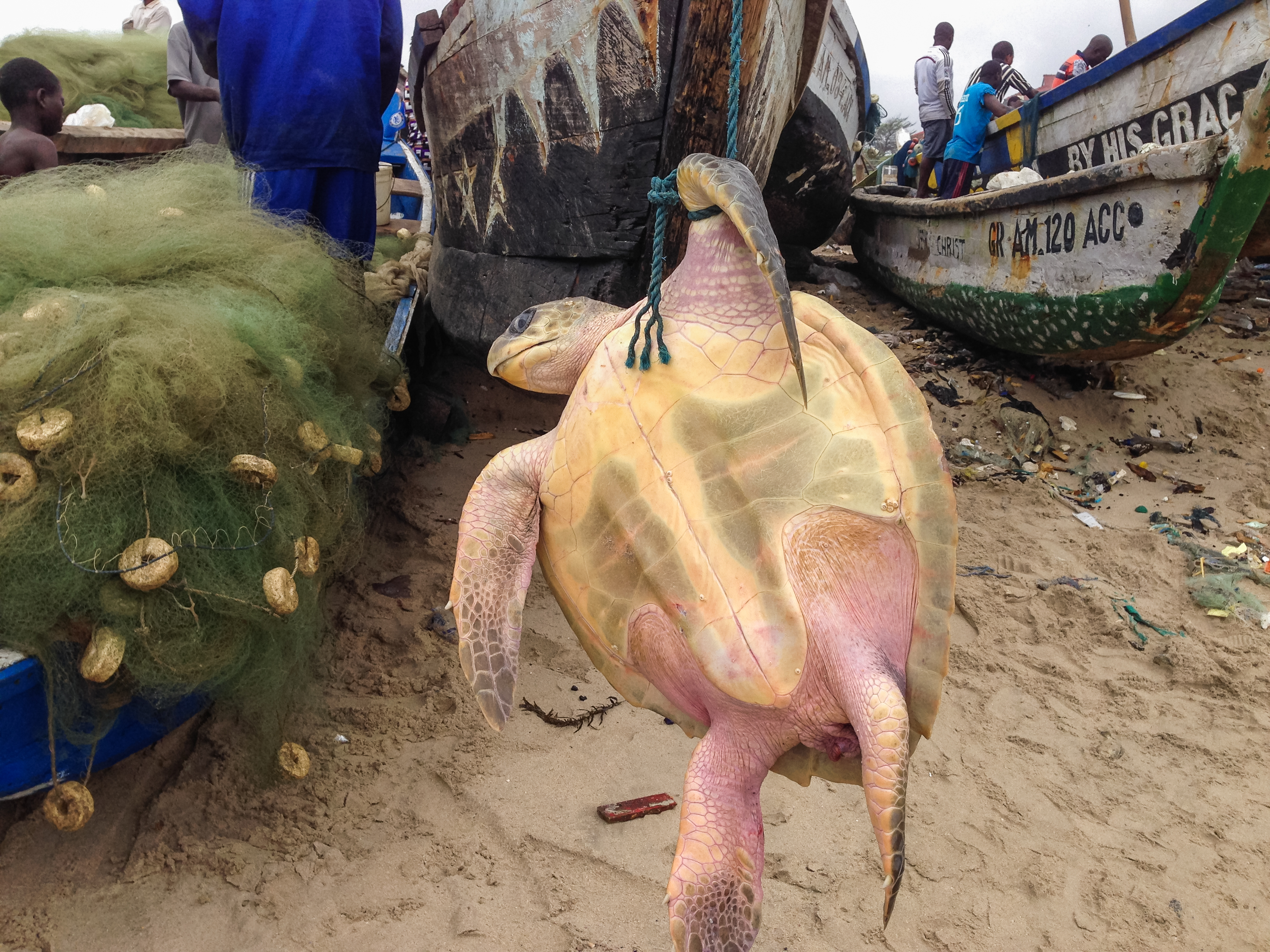
Captured sea turtle waiting to be slaughtered for meat at the Jamestown Fishing Harbor, Accra, Ghana

In many countries sea turtles are captured, killed, and traded for their meat, shells and leather flippers. Eggs are also at risk of poaching for consumption, and are considered a delicacy in certain cultures. Other cultures believe sea turtle eggs to be aphrodisiacs, while others claim that eating them yields longevity. In some islands, parts of the sea turtle are used in ceremonies and are considered sacred. Other times, the carcasses harvested are made into jewelry, instruments, souvenirs, sunglasses, or wall decorations, especially hawksbill sea turtles, which are desired for the striking details of the shell.

== Global warming ==
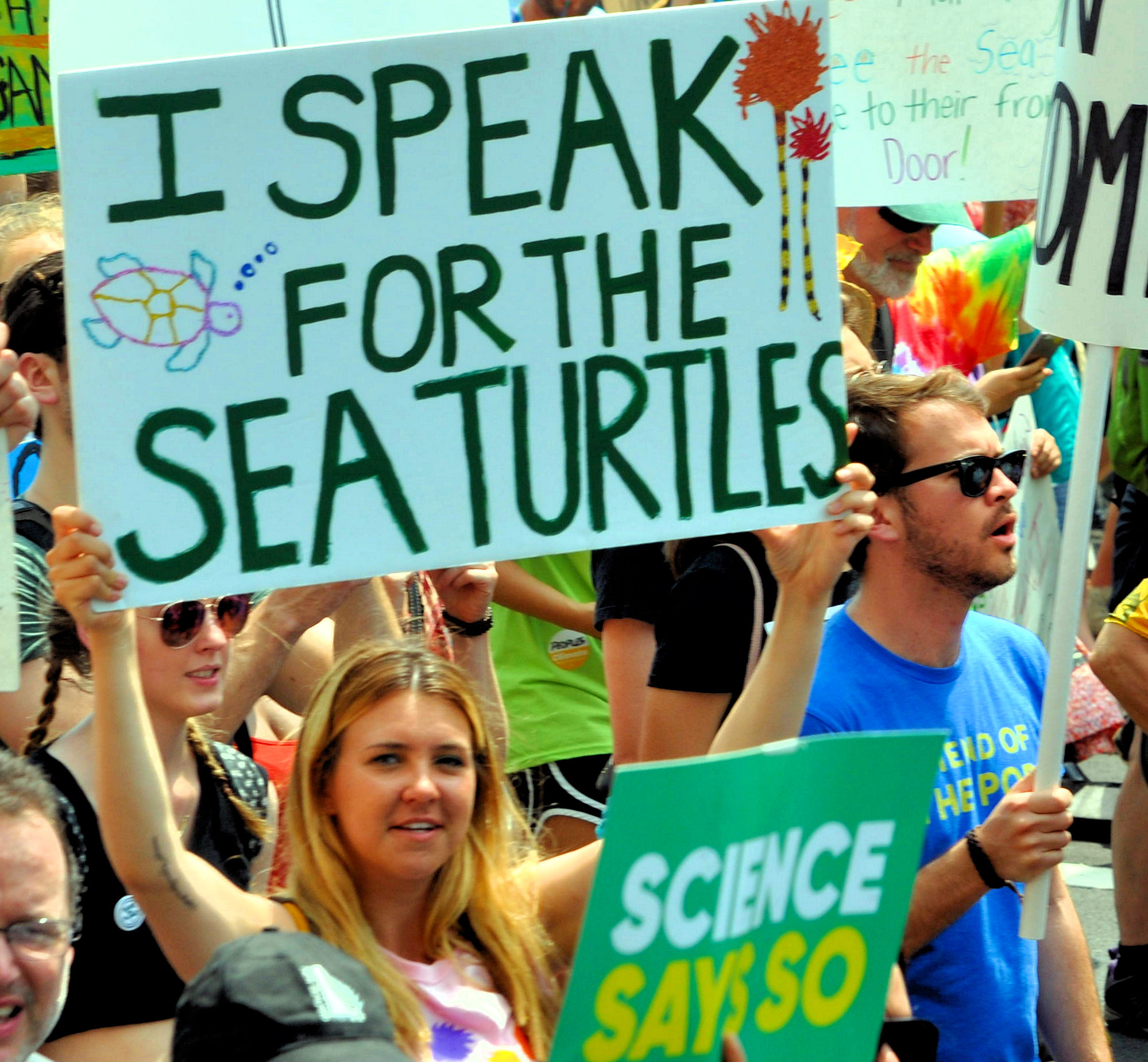
Placard "I speak for the sea turtles", at the People's Climate March (2017)

Global warming is estimated to have serious effects on wildlife over the next few decades. There is evidence that sea turtles have already been affected. With the increase of temperature, polar ice has melted and has led to the rise of sea levels. This rise in sea levels has been a factor in the loss of beach, which for sea turtles means less nesting area. Global warming has been associated with severe weather, which could mean harsh and numerous storms that erode beaches and flood nests. As the overall temperature of the Earth rises, so does the temperature of the sand, which diminishes the rate of hatchling survival. The temperature of the sand also affects gender, as higher temperatures have been shown to yield more female hatchlings. Changes in climate also influence currents and change the number and location of prey species. Water that is too warm can also cause coral bleaching, which is detrimental to reefs that are essential to certain species, such as the hawksbill sea turtle.

== Disease ==
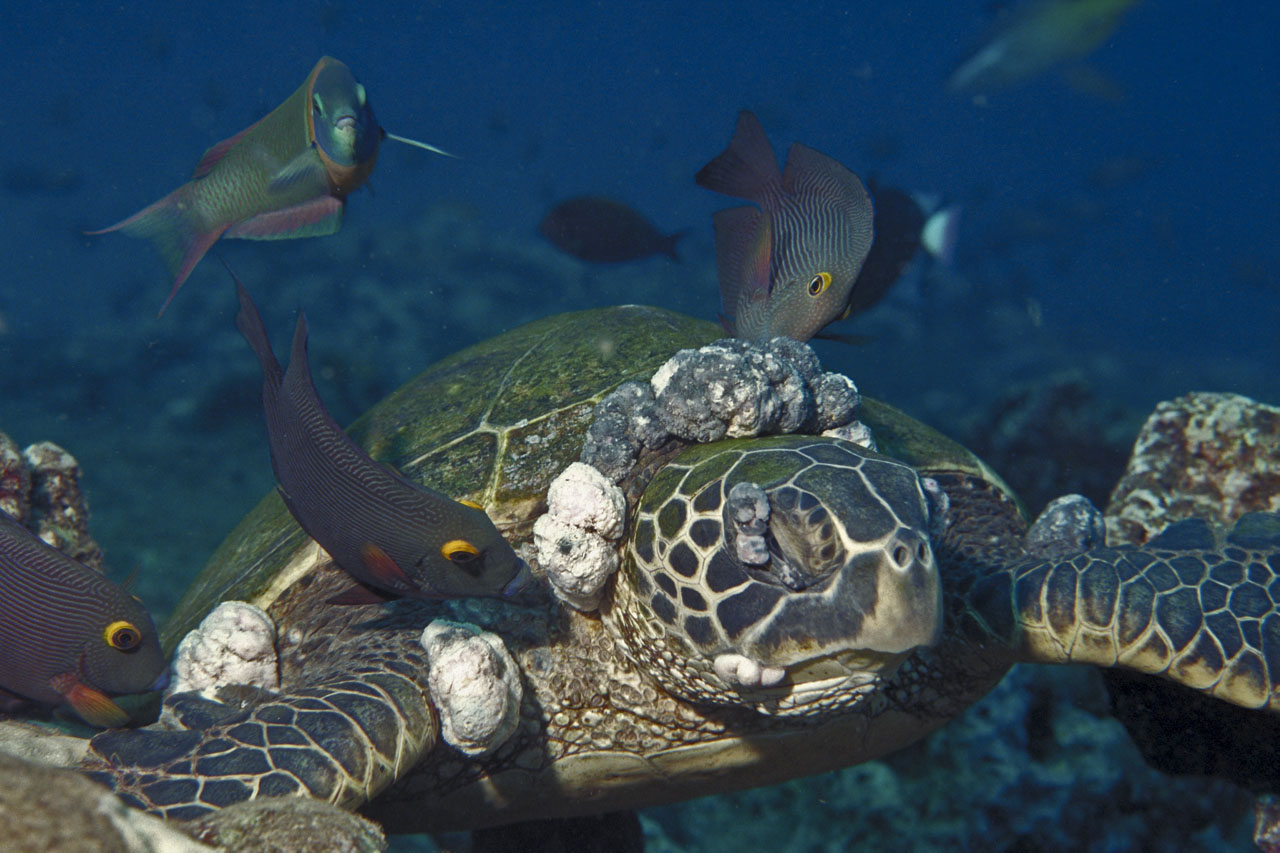
A sea turtle with fibropapillomatosis

A disease known as fibropapillomatosis manifests itself in turtles through external tumors. These tumors often grow to be so large that they hinder a sea turtle's ability to see, eat, and swim, therefore rendering the sea turtle unable to survive. Inexplicably, the majority of the cases of fibropapillomatosis have been diagnosed in the green sea turtle (Chelonia mydas) while none have been in the leatherback sea turtle (Dermochelys coriacea). Cases of this disease have been found in all major oceans. Although the causes of this disease are not clear, many believe the source to be viral. These tumors are either smooth or contain pointed projections and they are red, pink, grey, black, or purple in color. These tumors are usually located anywhere on the soft skin tissue of the sea turtle, either the neck, eyes, or bottom of the flippers and range in size anywhere from a pea to a grapefruit.

== Conservation efforts and rehabilitation centers ==
A study by Discovery News targets the Mediterranean, the Eastern Pacific, the Southwest Atlantic, and the Northwest Atlantic as the regions in the direst need of preservation endeavors. In 1963, the Marine Turtle Group was created by the chairman of the Survival Service Commission of the International Union for the Conservation of Nature and Natural Resources as the first international forum for sea turtle research and conservation. In the United States in 1973, the Endangered Species Act of 1973 was passed, providing protection for all sea turtle species, and in 1977, a Memorandum of Understanding was signed between the NOAA Fisheries and the U.S. Fish and Wildlife Service (USFWS) to enforce the ESA with regards to sea turtles. USFWS is responsible for all sea turtle conservation on nesting beaches and NOAA Fisheries are responsible for the marine conservation of sea turtles. The conservation of sea turtles on an international scale has been led by two major environmental agreements: the Indian Ocean – South-East Asian Marine Turtle Memorandum of Understanding and the Inter-American Convention for the Protection and Conservation of Sea Turtles. In an attempt to lessen the number of turtles killed by fishing incidents, several new types of turtle-safe fishing equipment have been introduced such as the circle hooks, fish bait, and turtle excluder devices. Poaching has been outlawed in most countries and turtle conservation education has been growing in both in size and efficiency.

Rehabilitation centers have been established as well, such as the Marine Life Center in Juno Beach, Florida, and the Karen Beasley Sea Turtle Rescue and Rehabilitation Center located on Topsail Island, North Carolina. The purpose of these centers is to help protect the local and endangered sea turtle population by: a) rescuing sick or injured turtles and taking them to the treatment facility, b) rehabilitating these turtles through various types of treatment and/or surgery, and c) releasing turtles back into the ocean once they have been successfully nursed back to health. Although some sea turtles' injuries are so severe that they can never become healed to the extent of being able to survive on their own outside of the facilities, hundreds of the patients from both the Gordon and Patricia Gray Veterinary Hospital in Juno Beach and the Sea Turtle Hospital in Topsail Island have been successfully rehabilitated and released in the last couple of decades.

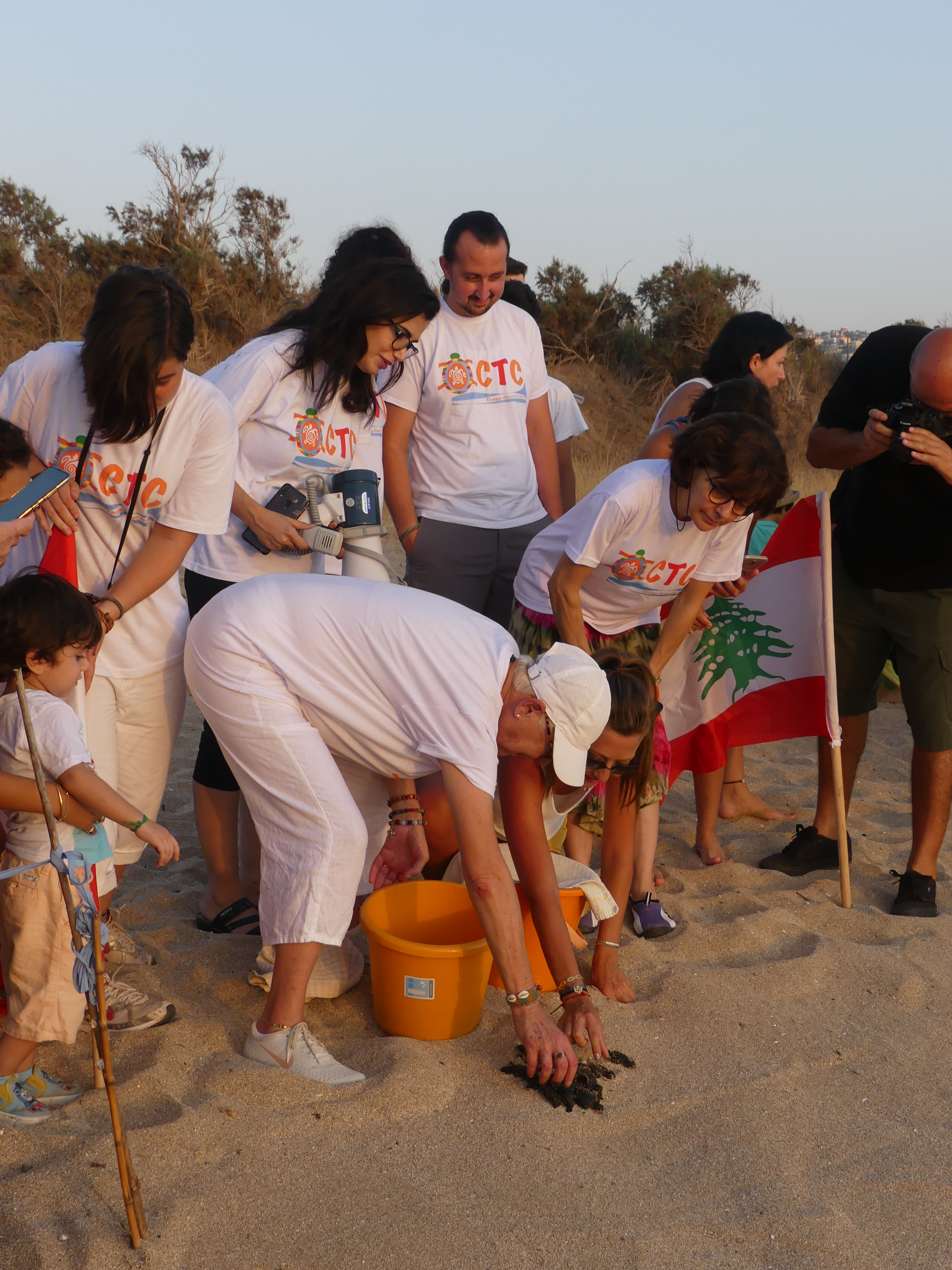
Lebanese conservationist Mona Khalil releasing sea turtle hatchlings on Mansouri beach, a major nesting site south of Tyre.

Watamu Marine National Park in Kenya provides another successful case study in mitigating direct human threats. Through a long-term nest monitoring program of 20 years and protection efforts, the Watamu program increased the number of clutches during the nesting seasons by 50% and enhanced hatching success. Successful strategies included patrolling nests to prevent illegal egg take and relocating clutches from high-risk areas impacted by tourism development. While illegal take of adults and eggs remains a concern, the introduction of protective legislation and conservation interventions improved long-term outcomes along the African continental east coast, where five out of the seven sea turtle species nest.

Such conservation programs demonstrate the importance of direct stakeholder involvement. By combining nest management, protective legislation, and community engagement, conservation strategies have shown not only to improve nesting success, but also increase the probability of post-hatchling survival. Further implementation of conservation and management measures will be significant in contributing to the long-term survival of sea turtles.

However, evaluating the progress of conservation programs is difficult, because many sea turtle populations have not been assessed adequately. Most information on sea turtle populations comes from counting nests on beaches, but this does not provide an accurate picture of the whole sea turtle population. A 2010 United States National Research Council report concluded that more detailed information on sea turtles' life cycles, such as birth rates and mortality, is needed.

== See also ==
- Memorandum of Understanding concerning Conservation Measures for Marine Turtles of the Atlantic Coast of Africa
- Memorandum of Understanding on the Conservation and Management of Marine Turtles and their Habitats of the Indian Ocean and South-East Asia
- Great Pacific Garbage Patch
