= Tropical Atlantic SST Dipole =

Sea surface temperature pattern

The Tropical Atlantic SST Dipole refers to a cross-equatorial sea surface temperature (SST) pattern that appears dominant on decadal timescales. It has a period of about 12 years, with the SST anomalies manifesting their most pronounced features around 10–15 degrees of latitude off of the Equator. It is also referred to as the interhemispheric SST gradient or the Meridional Atlantic mode.

This decadal-scale SST pattern constitutes one of the key features of SST variability in the Tropical Atlantic Ocean. Another one is the Atlantic Equatorial Mode, which occurs in the zonal (east-west) direction at interannual timescales, with sea surface temperature and heat content anomalies being observed in the eastern equatorial basin. Its importance in climate dynamics and decadal-scale climate prediction is evident when investigating its impact on adjacent continental regions such as the Northeast Brazil, the Sahel as well as its influence on North Atlantic cyclogenesis.

== Structure and key features of the interhemispheric SST dipole ==
Early studies have focused on the connection between the enhancement (decrease) of tropical rainfall in regions such as Northeast Brazil, the Western Sub-Saharan Africa etc. and perturbations in the tropical Atlantic sea surface temperatures (Moura and Shukla (1981), Nobre and Shukla (1996).) Such research efforts have concentrated on the role of the interhemispheric (meridional) SST mode as a dynamical driver of the tropical Atlantic overlying atmosphere, by analyzing perturbations of this coupled tropical ocean-atmosphere system while examining local as well as remote influences (i.e. the tropical -mid-latitude N. Atlantic connection (Tanimoto and Xie (1999), Tourre et al. (1999)), the tropical Pacific influence via El Nino/La Nina events (Enfield and Mayer (1997)).

Other studies, however, such as the ones carried out by Houghton and Tourre (1992) and Enfield and Mayer (1997), have questioned the very existence of this interhemispheric gradient (or SST dipole) as a statistical mode of climate variability. These studies suggest that the principal component analysis used to analyze the tropical Atlantic variability (TAV) and extract these statistical SST modes imposes a constraint on the analysis (due to the requirement of the orthogonality of the principal components that are associated with the different SST modes), without which the connection between the SST anomaly patterns in the Northern and Southern hemispheres appears to be insignificant.

Ruiz-Barradas et al. (2001) proposed that the aforementioned controversy potentially exists due to the fact that most of the previously-cited studies have attempted to identify tropical Atlantic SST patterns of variability based solely on ocean data, instead of making use of a combined analysis of observed or modeled perturbations in both the ocean and the atmosphere. Following such an additive approach, Ruiz-Barradas et al. noted that a positive Northern Hemisphere (NH) SST anomaly is associated with a northward, wind-stress anomaly and a subsequent cyclonic (counterclockwise) circulation in the subtropics, which interferes with the background flow easterlies; the opposite is true for the southern hemisphere, where the wind stress anomaly acts to enhance the south-easterlies. Such interference with the background flow subsequently leads to a decrease (enhancement) of the heat fluxes from the ocean toward the atmosphere and therefore an intensification of the positive(negative) SST anomalies, in the warm (cool) hemisphere.

- Other discernible features of the interhemispheric dipole noted in the aforementioned study, include a strengthened, anomalous downwelling in the hemisphere that is characterized by positive SST anomalies and a respective, less prevalent upwelling in the negative SST anomalies-hemisphere.
- Furthermore, diabatic heating perturbations are also shown to be linked to cross-equatorial SST changes, with positive anomalies being observed over the warmer Northern hemisphere waters and negative ones over the Southern hemisphere. A strong connection is also found between the tropical Atlantic SST dipole and the overlying atmosphere; enhanced convective patterns and anomalous precipitation appear correlated with warm NH SSTs, whereas the opposite phase is observed across the equator, over the cooler SH waters.
- Finally, a connection is discerned between the surface and sub-surface interhemispheric pattern-related SSTs. Northern SST anomalies appear to permeate vertically below the ocean surface reaching thermocline (THC) depths and inciting in this way THC anomalies of up to 3m. This provides additional evidence of the critical role of surface ocean currents in transporting warm waters and heat meridionally, since surface wind-induced Ekman pumping appears to be the key contributor for such THC and heat content anomalies.

== Seasonal dependence ==
The meridional (interhemispheric) mode demonstrates seasonal changes, arriving to a maximum during the boreal spring, on and north of the equator. The seasonal changes in surface wind forcing, which are closely linked to the seasonal displacement of the ITCZ, incite a response on the ocean surface, affecting current systems in the tropical Atlantic as well as the slope of the underlying thermocline (THC). For example, during the Southern hemisphere spring and summer months (November–April), when the south trade winds are weak and the ITCZ is displaced further to the south, there is enhanced flow to the north along the coast of South America via the North Brazil Current (NBO); this helps transport additional heat further to the north.

The Atlantic ITCZ is very sensitive to even small changes in the interhemispheric SST gradient due to the fact that tropical SSTs are very uniform in magnitude throughout the equatorial region between 10°S -5°N. Therefore, even a small change in the SST field can cause a significant impact on the position and displacement of the ITCZ. Such shifts, along with the associated development of the equatorial cold tongue, are features of the seasonal climate that are essential to the formation and evolution of the interannual and decadal tropical Atlantic variability (TAV).

A strong seasonality is also observed with respect to the remote, North Pacific influence in the tropical Atlantic, via ENSO events that induce western equatorial wind stress anomalies (WEA), which in return modulate the tropical Atlantic Ocean-atmosphere dynamics. During an ENSO warm event, the sea level pressure is lower than normal over the central and eastern equatorial Pacific and greater than normal over the tropical Atlantic. This leads to a diminished, meridional pressure gradient in both basins, consistent with a reduction in the background easterly wind flow. The decrease of meridional pressure gradient is enhanced by a low pressure center that develops during the boreal winter over the southwestern N. Atlantic, resulting, thus, to a lagged (by about one season with respect to the tropical Pacific SST maximum) maximum warming of the northern hemisphere tropical Atlantic during the boreal spring.

== Impacts ==
Northeastern Brazil is one of the key regions that are severely affected by the meridional mode of tropical Atlantic SST variability. More specifically, an anomalous displacement of the ITCZ toward the north (south) leads to anomalous rainfall patterns and thus significant drying (wetting) over NE Brazil; this is also associated with a pattern of anomalous warm (cold) SST in the northern tropical Atlantic and with directly opposite conditions across the southern tropical Atlantic. Similarly, the Tropical Atlantic SST dipole is shown to impact the climate of West Saharan Africa, causing major droughts, such as the one in 1914 and during the 1968–1974 time period. Such extreme events have drastic effects on the land use as well as directly on human life.

Other consequences of the Tropical Atlantic SST dipole include modulation of the strength and frequency of the Atlantic hurricanes via a series of mechanisms: a. enhancement of easterly wave propagation during the positive phase of the SST dipole (associated with a wetter West Saharan Africa and increased convective activity which in retrospect promotes a greater N. Atlantic hurricane activity), b. influence on moist static stability and vertical wind shear, c. modulation of the North Atlantic Oscillation (NAO) by changing the subtropical surface pressure patterns, and thus affecting tropical- extratropical, ocean-atmosphere processes that are vital for the development or the weakening of North Atlantic hurricanes.

== See also ==
- ENSO
- Atlantic Equatorial mode
- North Atlantic Oscillation
