= Euroleague for Life Sciences =

Network of leading universities

The Euroleague for Life Sciences (ELLS), established in 2001, is a network of leading universities cooperating in the fields of natural resource management, agricultural and forestry sciences, life sciences, veterinary sciences, food sciences, and environmental sciences. ELLS offers summer schools, joint degree programmes, study abroad opportunities and cooperations on PhD level. Every year a member university hosts the ELLS Scientific Student Conference.

== Members ==
- University of Natural Resources and Life Sciences, Vienna, BOKU
- University of Hohenheim
- University of Copenhagen, Faculty of Science
- Swedish University of Agricultural Sciences
- Wageningen University and Research Centre
- Czech University of Life Sciences Prague
- Warsaw University of Life Sciences

== Partners ==
- Cornell University, College of Agriculture and Life Sciences
- China Agricultural University
- Hebrew University of Jerusalem, Robert H. Smith Faculty of Agriculture, Food and Environment
- Lincoln University (New Zealand)

== See also ==
- 2001 in the environment
- Coriolis (project)
