= Tav =

Tav or TAV may refer to:

== Math, science and technology ==
- Tav (number), in set theory the collection of all cardinal numbers
- The Advanced Visualizer, a 3D graphics software package
- Ti-6Al-4V, a titanium alloy containing aluminum and vanadium
- Tire Assault Vehicle, a small teleoperated vehicle used to test Space Shuttle tires
- Tomato aspermy virus, a plant virus
- Tropical Atlantic Variability, in meteorology

== Nickname ==
- Tav Falco (born 1945), American musical performer, performance artist, actor, filmmaker and photographer
- Octavio M. Salati ("Tav") (1914–2001), American engineer, academic and educator

== Transportation ==
- TAV, IATA airport code for Tau Airport, American Samoa
- TAV, airline code for Compañía de Servicios Aéreos Tavisa
- TAV-8B, the two-seat version of the McDonnell Douglas AV-8B Harrier II aircraft
- TAV Airports Holding (Tepe Akfen Ventures), a Turkish airport operator
- Treno Alta Velocità, the a special-purpose entity working name for the Italian high-speed rail network
- TAV RJ-SP, the far future possible Brazilian Rio–São Paulo high-speed rail system

== Other uses ==
- tav, ISO 639-3 code for the Tatuyo language of Colombia
- Tav (letter), the last letter of many Semitic abjads
- The Artists Village, an experimental arts group in Singapore
- Toon-A-Vision channel
