= Taw (disambiguation) =

Taw or TAW may refer to:

- Taw (letter), the twenty-second letter in many Semitic alphabets
- Taw (number), the collection of all cardinal numbers
- the shooter marble in a game of marbles
- the River Taw in Devon, England
- Taw (locomotive), a British narrow gauge railway locomotive built in 1897, named after the river
- TAW, The Artist's Way
- Tai Wai station, Hong Kong Mass Transit Railway station code TAW
- Tawing with alum, a method of producing white leather
- Toa Airways, a Japanese airline
- Tomas Andersson Wij, Swedish singer, songwriter and journalist known by the initials TAW
- F-22 Total Air War, a fighter jet flight simulator game
- Total available water in soil for crops

== See also ==
- Tau (disambiguation)
- Tav (disambiguation)
