= Coriolis (project) =

Oceanographical joint project of seven French institutes

Coriolis project logo

Coriolis involves 7 institutes in operational oceanography in France (CNES, CNRS, Ifremer, IPEV, IRD, Météo-France, Shom) decided in 2001 to joint their efforts within Coriolis in order to:

- organise and maintain data acquisition in real-time and delayed mode of in-situ measurements necessary for operational oceanography.
- Set up an operational in-situ data centre,
- develop and improve the technology necessary for operational oceanography.

== Context ==
Data useful for operational oceanography, are obtained by diverse means including in-situ (ships, drifters, floats, moorings, etc.) and satellites. They come in very different forms, from a single variable measured at a single point to multivariate, four-dimensional collections of data that can represent data volumes from a few bytes to gigabytes. In the 2000s, there began the emergence of assembly centres that:

- integrate data coming from a wide variety of platforms and providers (including scientists, national data centres, satellite data centres and operational agencies),
- get enough information from the originators to be able to know exactly how the data have been acquired and processed (documented and commonly agreed QC procedures, history of the processing),
- and then distribute them in an agreed standard.

Coriolis (project) action built one of these Data Assembly Centers that has originally been designed to provide the French ocean forecasting centers, MERCATOR-Océan and French Hydrographic Service ( SHOM), with real-time qualified and integrated products, first for assimilation and then for validation purposes particularly in the framework of MyOcean European project. With the arrival of re-analysed products, such as CORA dataset, Coriolis is also able to serve the research community.

== See also ==
- 2001 in the environment
