= Null Island =

Cartographical (only) marker at 0°N, 0°E

- Location within Africa

Geography
- Coordinates: 0°N 0°E

Null Island is the location at zero degrees latitude and zero degrees longitude (0°N 0°E), where the prime meridian and the equator intersect in the Atlantic Ocean near the Gulf of Guinea. Since there is no landmass located at these coordinates, it is not an actual island. The name is often used in mapping software as a placeholder to help find and correct database entries that have erroneously been assigned the coordinates 0,0. Although "Null Island" started as a joke within the geospatial community, it has become a useful means of addressing a recurring issue in geographic information science.

== Location ==
The point on the Earth's surface defined as Null Island is located in international waters in the Atlantic Ocean, roughly 600 kilometres (320 nmi) south of the West African coast in the Gulf of Guinea. The depth of the seabed there is around 4,940 m (16,200 ft).

The closest land to Null Island is a small islet 570 km (354 mi; 307.8 nmi) to the north (4°45′30″N 1°58′33″W) that is part of Ghana. The nearest point on the mainland is Achowa Point between Akwidaa and Dixcove, both in Ghana.

== In software ==
In terms of computing and placename databases, the coordinates for Null Island were added to the Natural Earth public domain map dataset c. 2010–2011, after which the term came into wide use (although there is evidence of it being used previously). Since then, the "island" has, through fiction, been given a geography, history, and flag. Natural Earth describes the entity as a "1 meter square island" (11 sq ft) with "scale rank 100, indicating it should never be shown in mapping". The name "Null" refers to the two zero coordinates, as null values (indicating an absence of data) are often coerced to a value of 0 when converted to an integer context or "no-nulls allowed" context.

The location is used by mapping systems to trap errors. Such errors arise, for example, where an image artifact is erroneously associated to the location by software which cannot attribute a geoposition, and instead associates a latitude and longitude of "Null,Null" or "0,0". As reported in January 2018 by Bellingcat, other data mapped to the location include activity events from the Strava fitness-tracking app, apparently mapped to the location due to users entering "0,0" coordinates to disguise their real locations.

== Soul buoy ==
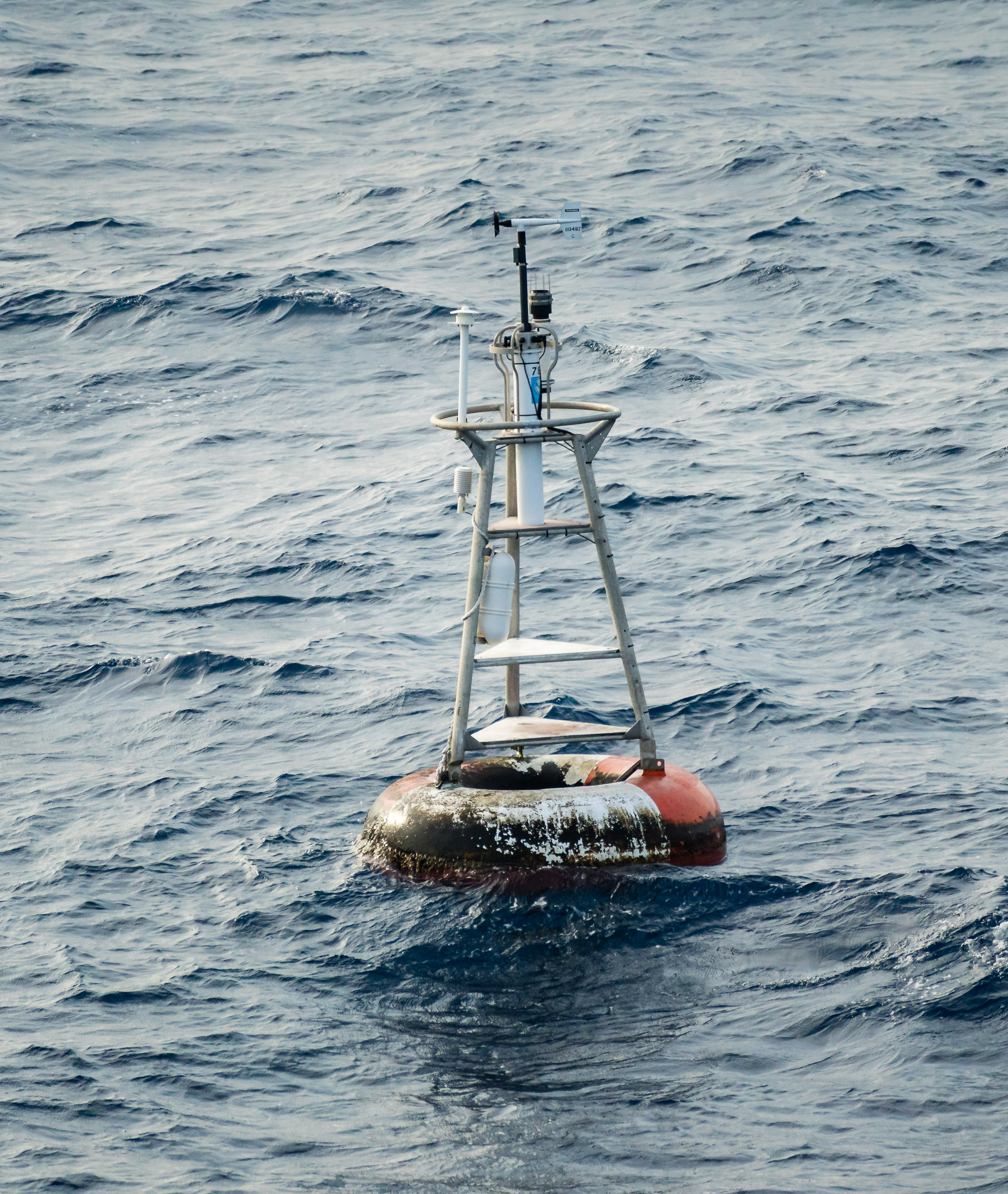
The weather buoy formerly moored at the coordinates of Null Island, 0°N 0°E

A weather buoy, named the Soul buoy after the soul music genre, was moored at this location. The buoy ("Station 13010 – Soul") was part of the PIRATA system, a set of 17 buoys installed in the tropical Atlantic Ocean since 1997 by the United States, France, and Brazil. Like the other buoys in the system, it was named after a musical genre. It was an Autonomous Temperature Line Acquisition System (ATLAS) buoy that was conical in shape and 3.8 metres (12 ft) high. It was anchored by a cable to the seabed.

The buoy disappeared less than a year after its installation, and was replaced in 1998. In March 2021, the buoy was relocated to 0°, 3°W due to an expanded piracy high-risk area in the Gulf of Guinea.

== In culture ==
Artistic representation of Null Island and the former real-life buoy at the focal coordinates. The island is often depicted in the shape of the video game island of Myst (which is inspired by the fictional Lincoln Island used by Jules Verne's character Captain Nemo, situated in the South Pacific, west of Point Nemo).

Null Island has developed from a technological oddity into a cultural reference for a place of the digital age. First named by Steve Pellegrin as a joke in 2008, going online with a site about the Republic of Null Island ("Like no place on Earth"), Null Island has gained a status of a liminal central point of the world with a varied range of cultural representations.

== See also ==
- Colonel Bleep, a 1957 animated cartoon that took place on the fictitious "Zero Zero Island" at 0 latitude and 0 longitude
- Latitude Zero, a 1969 movie about a fictional utopia that is placed at coordinates (0, 0) on the bottom of the Gulf of Guinea
- Category:Phantom geographical features
