= The Black Book of Corporations =

2001 book by Lobo and Weiss

- First-edition cover
- Author: Klaus-Werner Lobo and Hans Weiss
- Original title: Das Schwarzbuch Markenfirmen
- Genre: Non-fiction
- Publication date: 2001

The Black Book of Corporations (German: Das Schwarzbuch Markenfirmen) is a book by Austrian journalists Klaus-Werner Lobo and Hans Weiss first published in 2001. The publication appeared shortly after large-scale protests against the Group of Eight (G8) summit in Genoa.

== Content ==
The book discusses the activities of a range of multinational corporations linked in the authors’ view to social discrimination, environmental pollution, and alleged violations of labor standards, human rights and consumer protection.

Werner investigated companies accused of purchasing raw materials from suppliers in the Democratic Republic of the Congo, raising concerns about child and prison labour and indirect financing of armed groups. Weiss examined allegations regarding the conduct of clinical trials in parts of Eastern Europe. The authors present these case studies in the broader context of globalization, international trade organisations, and the influence of multinational enterprises.

== Editions ==
A second edition, The New Black Book of Corporations (German: Das neue Schwarzbuch Markenfirmen), was released in 2003. A third updated edition appeared in 2006. The book has been translated into several languages, including Dutch, Spanish, Hungarian, Turkish, Chinese, Korean, Swedish and Russian.

== See also ==
- Anti-globalization movement
- Globalization
- Corporation
- No Logo
