= Tire Assault Vehicle =

Small remote-controlled vehicle used to test Space Shuttle tires

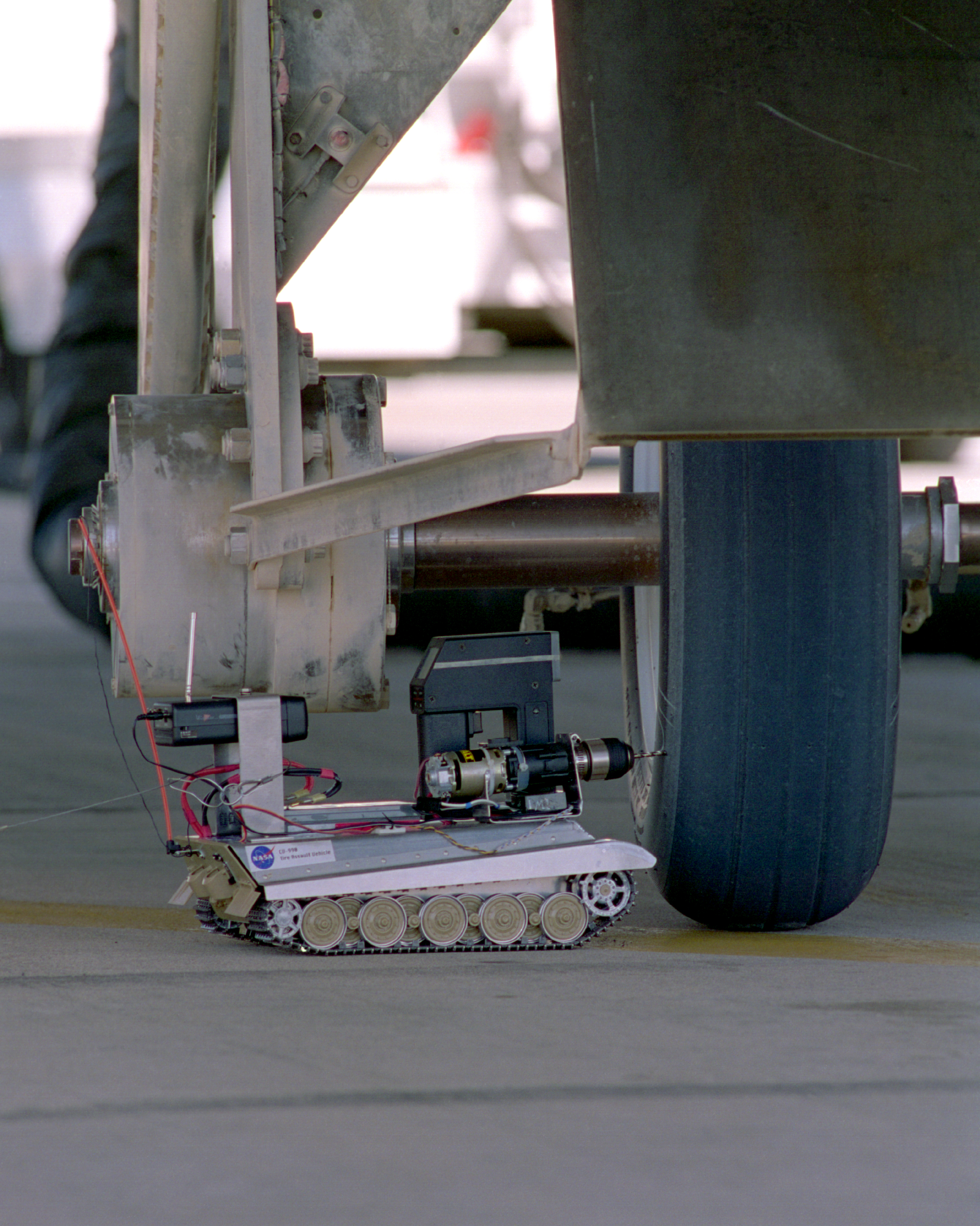
The Tire Assault Vehicle in action in 1995

The Tire Assault Vehicle (TAV) was a small remote-controlled vehicle created from a scale model kit of the German World War II-era Tiger II heavy tank, used by NASA to test the tires for the Space Shuttle. The TAV was used to drill into the tires to damage them, something which was too risky to perform manually because of the intensity of an aircraft tire explosion.

The TAV was built from a Tamiya 1/16th scale model of the Tiger II, extensively modified into a radio-controlled, video-equipped machine to drill holes in aircraft test tires that were in imminent danger of exploding because of high air pressure, high temperatures, or cord wear. Only roughly one quarter of the original model kit parts remained in the finished TAV, with most of the vehicle made from third-party hardware and custom-made metal parts.

The TAV was used in conjunction with the Convair 990 Landing System Research Aircraft, which tested Space Shuttle tires. It was imperative to know the extreme conditions the shuttle tires could tolerate at landing without putting the shuttle and its crew at risk. In addition, the CV-990 was able to land repeatedly to test the tires.

The TAV was developed by David Carrott, a Planning Research Corporation (PRC) employee under contract to NASA. It survived its service as a test vehicle, and as of 2017 was on display at the NASA Armstrong Gift Shop at Edwards Air Force Base.

As of 2023, Tamiya was still advertising a version of the model kit used to build the TAV.
