= Tropical Atlantic Variability =

The Tropical Atlantic Variability (TAV) is influenced by internal interaction and external effects. TAV can be discussed in different time scales: seasonal (annual cycle) and interannual.

== Annual cycle ==
Seasonal variability is the dominant time scale of TAV, which is due to the seasonal march of the Sun. This seasonal variability is related to the movement of Intertropical Convergence Zone (ITCZ), which is the convergent zone of trade winds from south and north near the equator. It has strong vertical convection resulting to a redundant participation band and weak winds. The mean location of the ITCZ over the Atlantic Ocean is 5–10 degrees north of the geographical equator. All this asymmetric of ITCZ is the ultimate cause of the annual cycle in equatorial sea surface temperature (SST) in Atlantic by maintaining southerly cross-equatorial winds that intensify in boreal summer/fall and relax in boreal spring. From March to April, during which the temperature of the equator reaches maximum, winds are weakest and the sun shines directly over the equator. So, SST is uniformly warm near the equator, which makes the ITCZ really sensitive to even small disturbance of SST and explains the relaxation of cross-equator winds in spring. From July to September, during which the temperature of the equator reaches its minimum, ITCZ reaches its northernmost location, which explains the intensification of cross-equator winds. It can be seen that the process of cooling takes 3 months while that of warming takes 7 months, which are asymmetric. This seasonal asymmetry is due to influence of seasonal continental monsoon. Because of the narrow width of Atlantic, continental monsoon has a much more important influence on its variation compared to the wide Pacific Ocean, whose leading factor is air-sea interaction.

== Interannual cycle ==
For interannual, there is one mode called Atlantic Niño, of which periodicity varies. During the Atlantic Nino event, eastern area of Atlantic will appear warm SST anomalies accompanying a relaxation of trade winds. This mechanism, which is known as Bjerknes feedback, is similar to El Niño–Southern Oscillation (ENSO).

"On interannual and longer timescales, no single mode seems to dominate. Instead, several mechanisms are responsible for tropical Atlantic variability. On the equator, both observational and modeling studies indicate that there is a Bjerknes-type air–sea coupled mode arising from the interaction of the equatorial zonal SST gradient, ITCZ convection, zonal wind, and thermocline depth."
