= Hans Weiss (author) =

Austrian writer

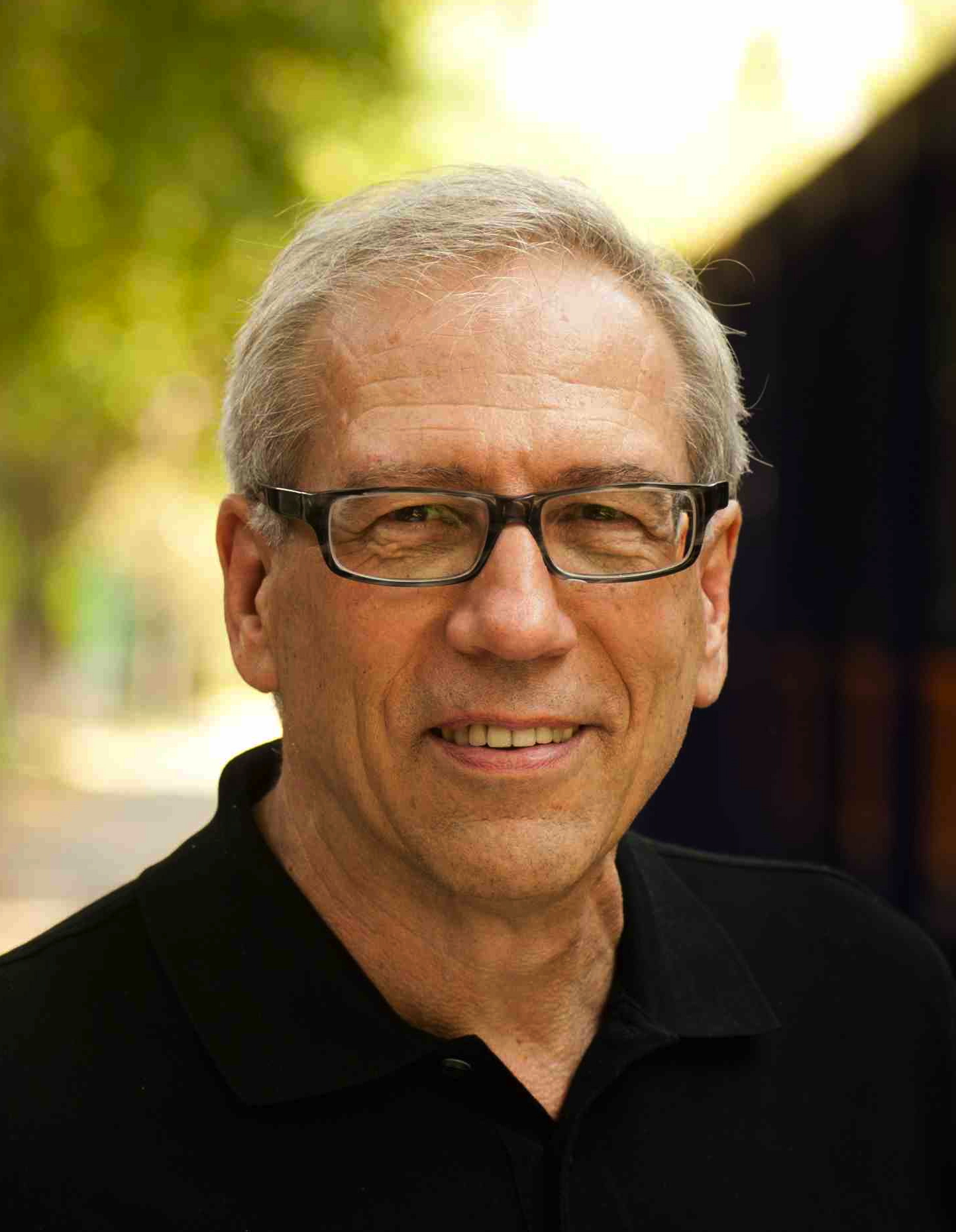
- Born: Hans Weiss; 1950 (age 75–76); Vorarlberg, Hittisau, Austria
- Occupations: journalist; photographer; writer

Hans Weiss (born 1950) is an Austrian writer (fiction and non-fiction), journalist and photographer

Hans Weiss lives and works as an independent writer and photographer in Vienna, Austria. His books sold more than five million copies worldwide and have been translated into twenty languages.

== Life and career ==
Weiss was born in Hittisau, a remote village in Austria. He studied psychology, philosophy and sociology in Innsbruck and Vienna and graduated in 1976 with a PhD. His thesis about the horrible state of care in an Austrian psychiatric clinic caused a scandal. After legal disputes and an internal investigation the director of the clinic was dismissed. The PhD-theses led to widespread reforms in the psychiatric services in Austria.

Hans Weiss completed his studies at the Institute for Advanced Studies in Vienna with an MA in sociology in 1978. In 1977 he got a four-month scholarship from the Italian Ministry of Foreign Affairs to study psychiatric services in Italy. In 1978–79 he went to Cambridge, England, and London with a scholarship from the British Council to study the psychiatric services in England.

His first book Gesunde Geschäfte (Healthy Business – about the malpractices of the pharmaceutical industry), written 1981 in collaboration with three colleagues, was an immediate bestseller in the German speaking world. For this book he worked as a salesman for the pharmaceutical companies Bayer and Sandoz and collected thousands of highly confidential files. Healthy business describes in detail how pharmaceutical companies bribe doctors and use patients as guinea pigs.

His next book Bittere Pillen (Bitter Pills – risks and benefits of the most frequently used drugs), written 1983 in cooperation with the same colleagues as his first book, was an even greater success – with more than three million copies sold. This comprehensive reference work is updated every three years and is up to the present day used by patients and doctors alike.

Since then, he wrote more than twenty books, as author or co-author, fiction and non-fiction. His main topics are unethical practices of multinational companies (The Black Book of Corporations), tax evasion tricks of global banks and companies (Antisocial Market Economy) and especially Medicine (Corrupt Medicine, The promises of the Beauty Industry).

Between 1982 and 1984 he directed award-winning TV-documentaries for the Austrian Broadcast Corporation ORF.

During the spring-term of 1989 he taught methods of investigation at the Institute for Journalism and Communications (University of Vienna).

He often posed as a salesman for drug companies for his daring investigations, posing as a salesman, as a consultant for big pharmaceutical companies, doctor, import/export-dealer, heir of a wealthy company owner, prison psychologist and patient.

Sometimes he is focussing his view on very small communities or on one person. For example, in the book "The People of Langenegg" (Die Leute von Langenegg), where he described life in the 1930s and 1940s in a remote Austrian peasant village.

Occasionally he writes fiction. For example, the novel Kulissen des Abschieds (Scenery of the goodbye), published in 1999 by Ullstein Verlag/Berlin. In his fiction work he intertwines personal experience with historic facts, for example in the book Mein Vater, der Krieg und ich (My father, the war and I), which was published in 2005 by Kiepenheuer & Witsch in Cologne, Germany. For this publication he used the secret diaries his father wrote during military service in World War II and during the holidays in his village. His father was a simple soldier with an anti-Nazi attitude, stationed in Norway at the Russian Front and captured as a prisoner of war in France.

His journalistic reports for the magazines Der Spiegel, Stern, Die Zeit or the Austrian newspaper Der Standard often caused heated political debates, for example the illegal employment of a nurse in the family of the Austrian Chancellor Wolfgang Schüssel in 2006 or the lush farm subsidies to multimillionaires. In February 2018 he published a series of three articles in the German weekly Die Zeit, about the tax avoiding schemes of multinational companies in Austria.

In 1994/95 he lived in New York City and attended classes at the International Center of Photography. In 1998 and 2011 he completed courses at the Schule für künstlerische Fotografie (School of Art Photography) in Vienna. His photographs were on show in group exhibitions in the Museum der Moderne in Salzburg (2012, Rupertinum Salzburg (2012), Fotogalerie Vienna (2011), Saline Hallein (2010), Palazzo Zenobio in Venice (2009) and various other places. Single exhibitions at "Deutsches Haus New York" (2015) and Soho Photo Gallery New York (2016, 2017 and upcoming October 2018). In 2014/15 he again lived in New York City and published the diary Große Träume (big dreams) about his everyday live.

In 2022 -2023 he ran his own photo gallery (www.hansweiss.com at Servitengasse 1 in 1090 Vienna, where works by New York photographers, Italian and Austrian artists and his own photographic work was exhibited. From 2018 to the beginning of 2026, he regularly exhibited photos at Café A Casa in Servitengasse.

In September 2023, he organized a large photo exhibition in his hometown Hittisau in the very west of Austria, with photos of his father Johann Weiss and Josef Bilgeri. At the same time, he published the book My Father's Paradise – The People of Hittisau with photos by Johann Weiss and texts by Hans Weiss. The famous Austrian writer Christoph Ransmayer wrote: "Johann Weiss, a modest craftsman from the Bregenzerwald, seemed to become quieter and smaller from year to year at the side of his Chanel No 5-scented wife, until he finally disappeared. In the present volume, his son Hans Weiss brings him back to life - no, not to life, but in pictures and stories to the memory and paradise of a Vorarlberg village." And the former Austrian Ö1 radio-director Peter Klein wrote: "A very nice book. But above all, it is a loving book!"

== Awards, grants, honours ==
- "Dr. Georg Schreiber-Media Award" for two investigative reports in the German magazine Spiegel, Munich, 2012
- "Book lovers award 2008" for "Corrupt Medicine", Vienna 2009
- "Bruno Kreisky Anerkennungspreis for the Political Book" – Award for the book "Antisocial market Economy" (Asoziale Marktwirtschaft); Vienna/Austria, 2004
- "Book of the Year 1983 in Germany"- Award by the German Publishing Guild for the book Bittere Pillen (Bitter Pills – risks and benefits of drugs), Cologne, Germany, 1984
- "Best Austrian TV-Documentary 1981" – Award for the film "Mad World" (Irre Welt), Vienna/Austria, 1981
- British Council Scholar (a one-year scholarship at Bedford College, London and Fulbourn Hospital, Cambridge), 1978/1979
- Italian Ministry of Foreign Affairs Grant (four months) at the University of Florence (Italy), 1977

== Books – as author or co-author ==
- Aufgedeckt – Ermittlungen gegen mich selbst (Uncovered – Investigations against myself), Buchschmiede-Verlag, Wien 2026, ISBN 978-3-99192-163-9; E-Book ISBN 978-3-99192-162-2
- Das Paradies meines Vaters – Die Menschen von Hittisau (My father‘s paradise – The people of Hittisau), secretum hlb Verlag, Langenzersdorf, 2024, ISBN 978-3-9519744-9-1
- Große Träume- New York Diary (2015, e-book)
- Expérimentation et tentation – contribution to the book Big Pharma, by Mikkel Borch-Jacobsen, Paris: Les Arènes publishing company, 2013, ISBN 978-2-35204-259-4
- Schwarzbuch ÖBB – Unser Geld am Abstellgleis (The Black Book of the Austrian Railway System), Vienna: Deuticke, 2013, ISBN 978-3-552-062283
- Tatort Kinderheim (Crime Scene Children's Home), Deuticke, Vienna 2012, ISBN 978-3-552-06198-9
- Schönheit – die Versprechen der Beauty-Industrie (The Promises of the Beauty-Industry), Vienna: Deuticke, 2011, ISBN 978-3-552-06175-0
- Schwarzbuch Landwirtschaft – die Machenschaften der Agrarpolitik (The Black Book of Austrian Agriculture), Deuticke, Vienna 2010, ISBN 978-3-552-06145-3
- Korrupte Medizin – Ärzte als Komplizen der Konzerne (Corrupt Medicine), Cologne: Kiepenheuer & Witsch, 2008, ISBN 978-3-462-04037-1
- Mein Vater, der Krieg und ich (My Father, the War and I), Cologne: Kiepenheuer & Witsch, 2005, ISBN 3-462-03619-X
- Asoziale Marktwirtschaft – Insider aus Politik und Wirtschaft enthüllen, wie die Konzerne den Staat ausplündern (Antisocial Marketing Economy – Insiders Expose the Plundering of the State by Transnational Companies), Cologne: Kiepenheuer & Witsch, 2004, ISBN 978-3-462-03412-7
- 3 x täglich – kritische Gebrauchsinformationen zu 11.000 Arzneimitteln (three times a day – patient information about drugs), Cologne: Kiepenheuer & Witsch, 2003, ISBN 3-462-03222-4
- Schwarzbuch Markenfirmen (The Black Book on Corporations – The Unscrupulous Practices of the Transnational Corporations), original edition Vienna: Deuticke, 2001; new edition, Berlin: Ullstein Publishing Company, 2016; ISBN 978-3-548-37618-9
- Kulissen des Abschieds (Scenery of the Goodbye – a novel), Berlin: Ullstein, 1999, ISBN 3-550-08282-7
- Everything You Need To Know Before You Call the Doctor (US edition of Kursbuch Gesundheit, Cologne: Kiepenheuer & Witsch, 1990, 1992, 1997, 2001, 2006), New York: Black Dog & Leventhal, 2001; more than 1.3 million copies of this book were sold worldwide. US edition ISBN 1-57912-082-2
- Arbeit – fünfzig deutsche Karrieren (Working – Fifty German Careers); published in Hans-Magnus Enzensbergers Edition "The Other Library"; Frankfurt: Eichborn, 1990, ISBN 3-8218-4070-6
- WER? – ein Negativ-Who-is Who von Österreich (WHO? – Prominent Austrians and their Careers during the Nazi-Time); Vienna: Kremayr & Scheriau, 1988, ISBN 3-218-00475-6
- Öko-Bilanz Österreich (Ecological Balance Sheet of Austria); Vienna:Falter/ and Cologne: Kiepenheuer und Witsch, 1988, ISBN 3-462-01884-1
- Die Leute von Langenegg (The People of Langenegg – photographed by Konrad Nußbaumer und written about by Hans Weiss), Kiepenheuer & Witsch, 1986, ISBN 3-462-01824-8
- Gift-Grün – Chemie in der Landwirtschaft und die Folgen (Poison Green – Chemicals in Agriculture and the Consequences); Cologne: Kiepenheuer & Witsch, Cologne 1986, ISBN 3-462-01744-6
- Kriminelle Geschichten – Ermittlungen über die Justiz (Criminal Stories – Investigations about the Justice System in Germany and Austria); Cologne: Kiepenheuer & Witsch, 1985, ISBN 3-462-01872-8
- Stimmen aus den Alpen (Voices from the Alps) – contribution to the book "Im blinden Winkel" by Christoph Ransmayr, Vienna: Brandstädter-Publishing Company, 1985: This was a story about the last days of the Nazi-era in a small village in the west of Austria where Hans Weiss grew up. He made interviews with almost all of the villagers from both sides – Nazis and Anti-Nazis, ISBN 978-3-596-29563-0
- Bittere Pillen – Nutzen und Risiken von Arzneimitteln (Bitter Pills – Risks and Benefits of Drugs in Germany and Austria); Cologne: Kiepenheuer & Witsch, 1983, 1985, 1988, 1990, 1993, 1996, 1999, 2002, 2005, 2008, 2011, 2014, 2018; since 1983 more than three million copies sold, ISBN 978-3-462-05111-7
- Gesunde Geschäfte – die Praktiken der Pharma-Industrie (Healthy Business – The Shady Practices of the Pharmaceutical Industry); Cologne: Kiepenheuer & Witsch, 1981, 1982, ISBN 3-462-01549-4
