= MyOcean =

Series of projects granted by the European Commission

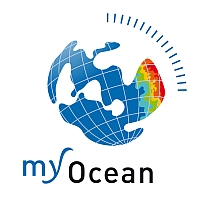

MyOcean is a series of projects granted by the European Commission within the GMES Program (Seventh Framework Program), whose objective is to define and to set up a concerted and integrated pan-European capacity for ocean monitoring and forecasting. The activities benefit several specified areas of use: Maritime security, oil spill prevention, marine resources management, climate change, seasonal forecasting, coastal activities, ice sheet surveys, water quality and pollution. The series of MyOcean projects ended in 2015, and their services are now continued by the Copernicus Programme.

The name MyOcean has also been used to brand the Copernicus Marine Service MyOcean Viewer, in operation since 2020.

== Objectives ==
MyOcean's objective is to set up (definition, design, development and validation) an integrated pan-European capability for ocean monitoring and forecasting, using nationally available skills and resources.

Although the budgetary frame of the project is labelled "Research", the priority is not to conduct further scientific research in the field of operational oceanography, even if this aspect is also taken into account. It is more a question of developing a System of Systems (in the industrial sense), according to the European quality standards, and to achieve operational qualification and eventually qualification of service.

== Context ==
The first MyOcean project started on 1 January 2009, scheduled to last for 39 months. It is a follow-up to the MERSEA project (FP6: system implementation phase: 2004-2008), and also integrates some service lines developed as part of ESA's GSE (GMES Service Elements) projects, particularly Marcoast and PolarView.

The follow-up project MyOcean2 runs from April 2012 to September 2014 to ensure a controlled continuation and extension of the services and systems already implemented.

== Figures ==
MyOcean is a consortium of 60 partners in 28 countries (the 22 states of the EU-27 that have a sea coastline, plus Norway, Russia, Ukraine, Morocco, Israel and Canada). Two European bodies (JRC and ECMWF) are also partners of 'MyOcean'. The (European Environment Agency) and the (European Maritime Safety Agency) are represented on the Board.

The total budget was €55M, of which €33.8M comes from a European Commission subsidy (representing 61% of the total budget), over 36 months. This budget essentially corresponded to staff costs (83.5%), with the second largest item being mission expenses (7.3% of the total budget). Management costs (and external communication costs) represented 4.1% of the total budget. Equipment fees represented 3%.

The total workload corresponded to the equivalent of 190 full-time employees, but in practical terms, there were more than 350 people involved in the project.

The total budget og MyOcean2 was €41M.

== Organisation ==
The project is coordinated between the executive level (the Executive Committee) and the strategic level (the Board). The role of the 'Governing Body' is to take high-level decisions that affect the project at a strategic level, the major themes, the budget or the make-up of the consortium.

On the 'Board' the following are represented: - Senior experts representing the main parties (INGV, Met Office, NERSC, DMI, Ifremer, CLS and Mercator Ocean) - The Chairmen of the Advisory Bodies (Core User Group and Scientific Advisory Committee) - Representatives of the European Stakeholders (EEA, EMSA, etc.)

The Board and the Governing Body are chaired by Pierre Bahurel.

=== TAC (Thematic Assembly Centres) Production Centres ===
Their role is to collect the measurements or observations, whether satellite or in situ, and to calibrate, validate, edit, archive and distribute them. There are 5 TACs (WP Leader shown in brackets):

- Sea Level TAC (CLS)
- Ocean Color TAC (CNR)
- Sea Surface Temperature TAC (Met Office)
- Sea Ice and Wind TAC (MET Norway)
- In Situ TAC (Ifremer), see CORA dataset global temperature and salinity product

TACs involved into MyOcean project are organized into 7 regions, each region is linked to the corresponding area defined into SeaDataNet project in order to improve efforts on data management and exchange of datasets.

=== MFC (Monitoring & Forecasting Centres) Production Centres ===
They correspond to the 6 European 'basins', plus the Global Ocean. By assimilating observation data in 3D Models, they are to predict the state of the ocean (or to say what the state of the ocean was between two observations). There are 7 of them:

- Global MFC (Mercator Ocean)
- Arctic MFC (NERSC)
- Baltic MFC (DMI)
- North West Shelves MFC (UK Met Office)
- Iberian, Biscay, Ireland MFC (Mercator Ocean)
- Mediterranean MFC (INGV)
- Black Sea MFC (Marine Hydrophysical Institute of the Ukrainian National academy of Sciences)

=== End of the project series and transition to the Copernicus Programme ===
After the MyOcean project (2009–2012), the second Milestone "MyOcean2" (2012–2014) came to an end on September 30 and let the floor to MyOcean follow-On, from October 1, 2014, until March 31, 2015. On 11 November 2014, the European Commission signed an agreement with the French privately owned non-profit company Mercator Ocean, that entrusts the latter with the setting-up of the future Copernicus Marine Service as of April 2015. The services provided of the former MyOcean site "myocean.eu" are now hosted by marine.copernicus.eu.
