= Memorandum of Understanding concerning Conservation Measures for Marine Turtles of the Atlantic Coast of Africa =

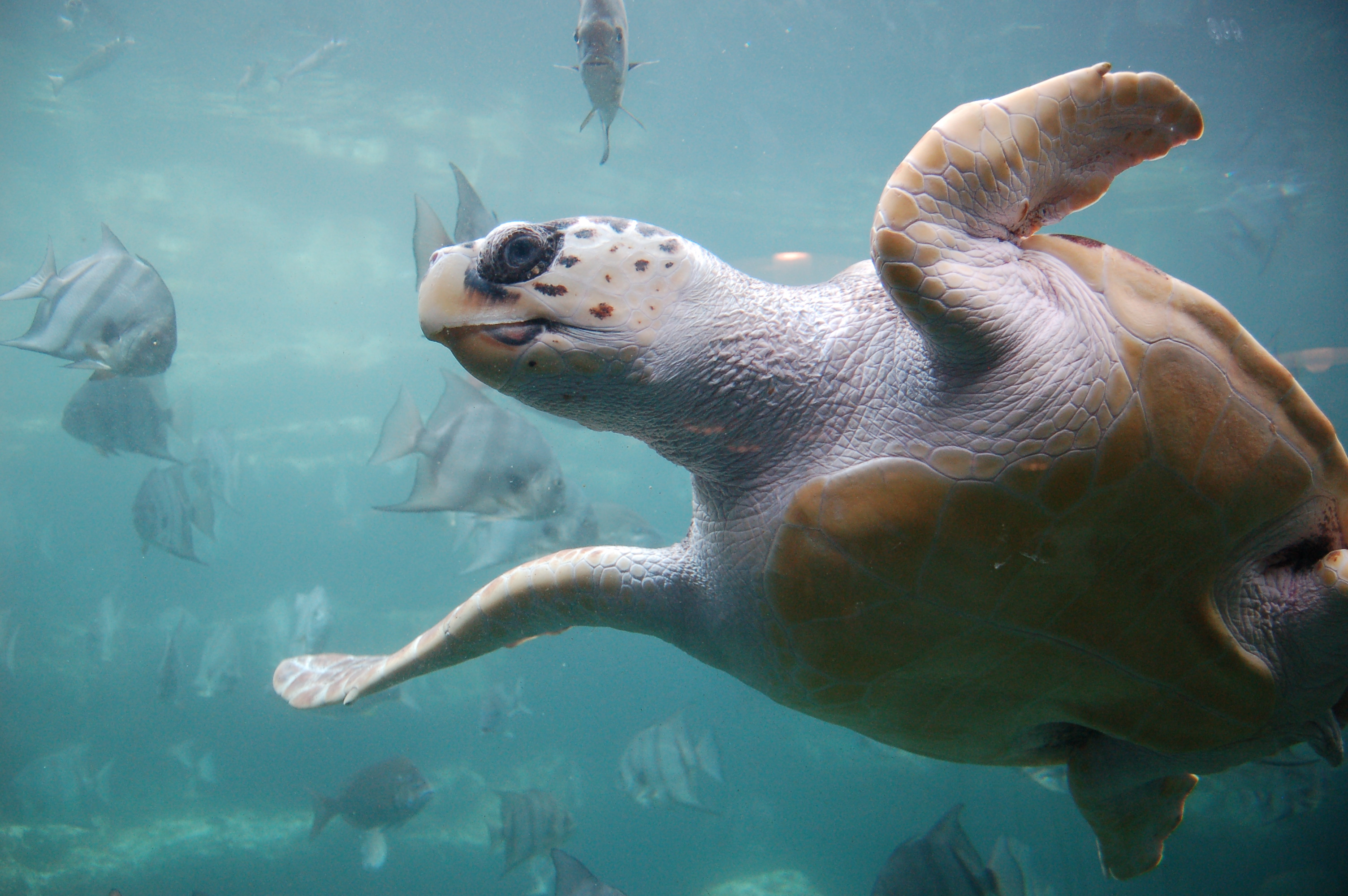
- Context: Nature conservation
- Signed: 7 March 2008
- Location: Bonn, Germany
- Effective: 1 July 1999
- Signatories: Benin; Congo; Equatorial Guinea; Gabon; Guinea; Guinea-Bissau; Mauritania; Democratic Republic of Congo; Gambia; Ghana; Nigeria; Togo; Angola; Morocco; Sao Tome and Principe; Senegal; Sierra Leone; Cameroon; Côte d’Ivoire; Liberia; Namibia; Cape Verde; South Africa
- Parties: 23
- Languages: English and French

The Memorandum of Understanding (MoU) concerning Conservation Measures for Marine Turtles of the Atlantic Coast of Africa is a 1998 multilateral environmental memorandum of understanding that entered into effect on 1 July 1999 under the auspices of the Convention on Migratory Species of Wild Animals (CMS), also known as the Bonn Convention. The MoU focuses on the protection of six marine turtle species that are estimated to have rapidly declined in numbers along the Atlantic Coast of Africa. The MoU covers 26 range States (Angola, Benin, Cameroon, Cape Verde, Congo, Côte d'Ivoire, Democratic Republic of Congo, Equatorial Guinea, Gabon, Gambia, Ghana, Guinea, Guinea-Bissau, Liberia, Mauritania, Morocco, Namibia, Nigeria, Portugal (Azores, Madeira), São Tomé and Príncipe, Senegal, Sierra Leone, South Africa, Spain (Canary Islands), Togo and United Kingdom). As of May 2013, 23 range States have signed the MoU.

== Development of MoU ==
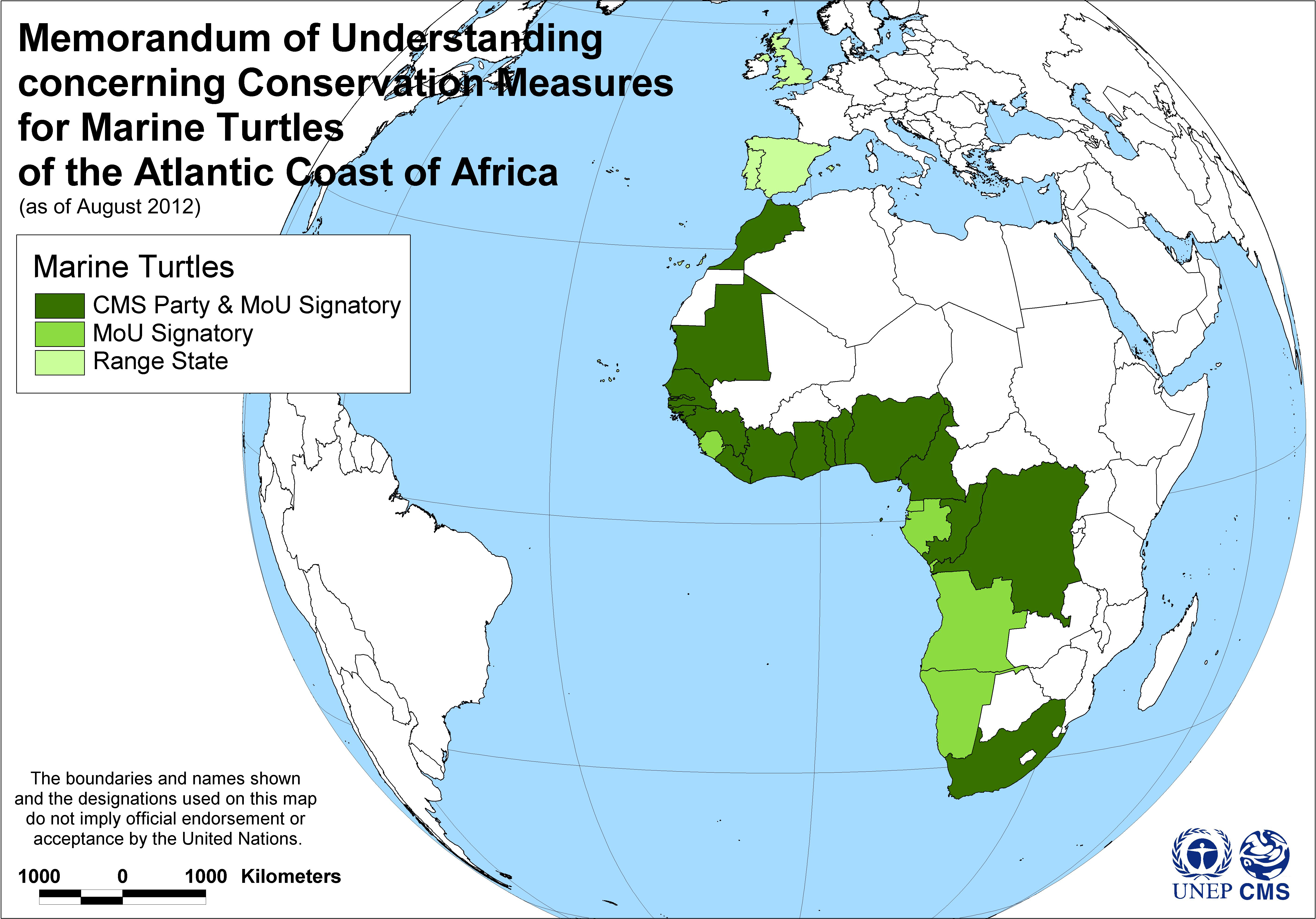
Map of Signatories to the Marine Turtles of the Atlantic Coast of Africa MoU, as of 15 August 2012

Marine turtles are thought to be numerous along much of the Atlantic Coast of Africa. The area includes nesting sites, feeding areas and migration corridors of importance to six species of marine turtles. To protect these species an Article IV agreement was concluded and came into effect on 1 July 1999.

Signatories to the Marine Turtles of Atlantic Coast of Africa MoU:

- Benin (29 May 1999)
- Congo (29 May 1999)
- Equatorial Guinea (29 May 1999)
- Gabon (29 May 1999)
- Guinea (29 May 1999)
- Guinea-Bissau (29 May 1999)
- Mauritania (29 May 1999)
- Democratic Republic of Congo (12 November 1999)
- Gambia (12 November 1999)
- Ghana (12 November 1999)
- Nigeria (12 November 1999)
- Togo (12 November 1999)
- Angola (9 May 2002)
- Morocco (9 May 2002)
- São Tomé and Príncipe (9 May 2002)
- Senegal (9 May 2002)
- Sierra Leone (9 May 2002)
- Cameroon (18 September 2002)
- Côte d'Ivoire (18 September 2002)
- Liberia (24 November 2005)
- Namibia (21 February 2006)
- Cape Verde (8 January 2007)
- South Africa (6 November 2007)

In addition, the CMS Secretariat also signed the MoU (29 May 1999).

The “Nairobi Declaration”, adopted at the May 2002 meeting, drew attention to the problem of by-catch in industrial fishing operations and emphasized the importance of involving local communities in the development and implementation of conservation activities. It seeks to maximise the advantages of cooperation between related conventions and NGOs, and the integration of marine turtle conservation measures within the emerging African Process for the Development and Protection of the Marine and Coastal Environment in Sub-Saharan Africa.

== Aim of MoU ==
The aim of the MoU is to safeguard six marine turtle species that are estimated to have rapidly declined in numbers during recent years due to excessive exploitation (both direct and incidental) and the degradation of essential habitats.

== Species covered by MoU ==
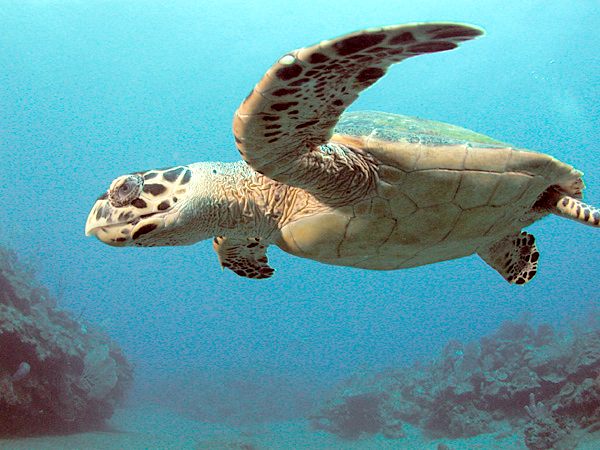
Hawksbill turtle

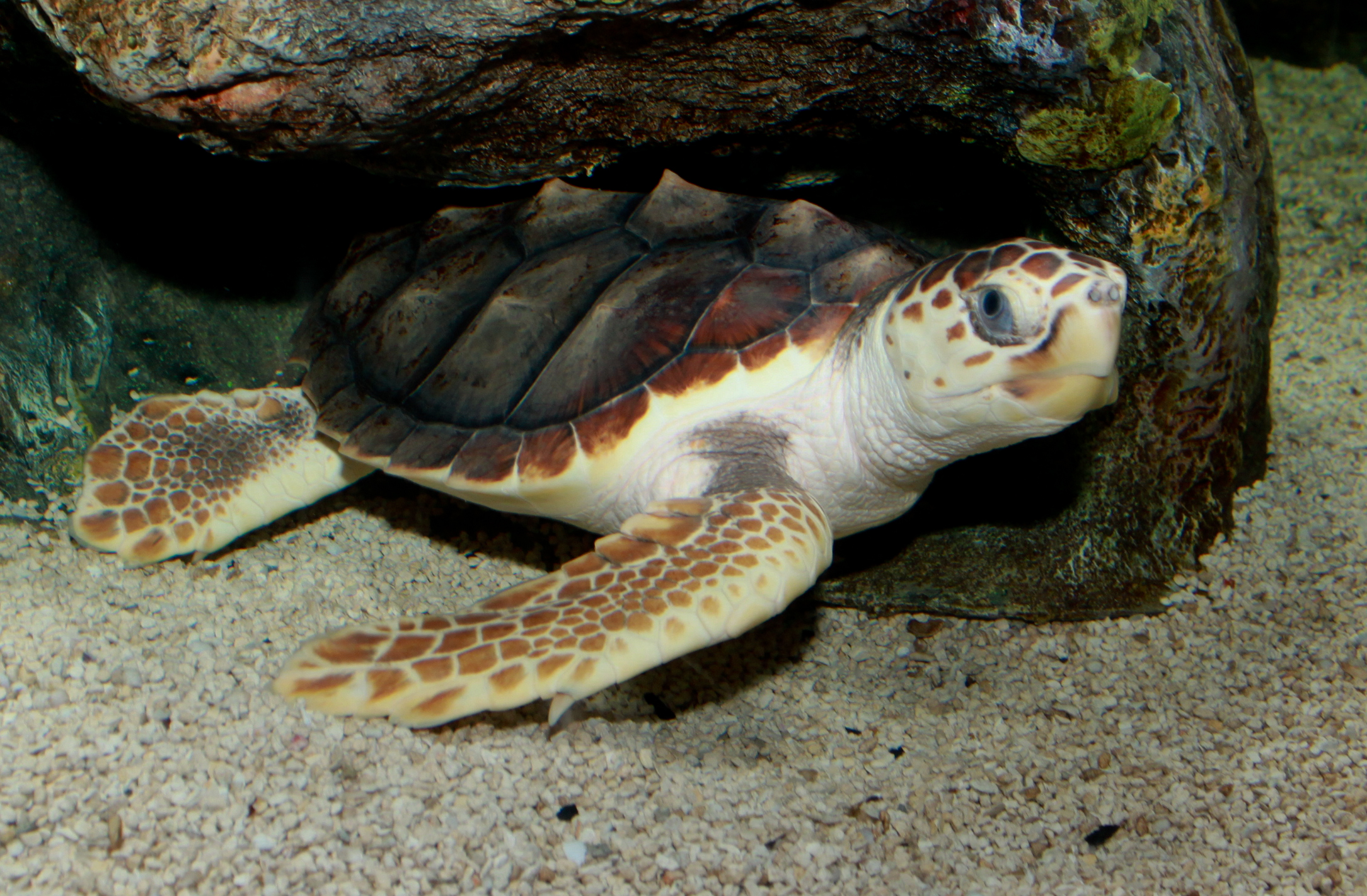
Loggerhead turtle

The MoU protects six species of marine turtles:

- Loggerhead turtle (Caretta caretta)
- Atlantic ridley turtle (Lepidochelys kempii)
- Olive ridley turtle (Lepidochelys olivacea)
- Green turtle (Chelonia mydas)
- Hawksbill turtle (Eretmochelys imbricate)
- Leatherback turtle (Dermochelys coriacea)

== Fundamental components ==
Conscious that concerted, coordinated action must be taken immediately to address the threats posed to the existing populations, the Signatories agree to work closely together to improve the conservation status of the marine turtles and the habitats on which they depend. To that end, they shall:

1. Endeavour to put in place measures for the conservation and, where necessary and appropriate, strict protection of marine turtles at all stages of their life cycle (including eggs, hatchlings, juveniles, sub-adults and adults)
2. Review and, as necessary, revise national legislation, and ratify or accede to those international conventions most relevant for the conservation of marine turtles, so as to enhance the legal protection given to these species
3. Implement in their respective countries, subject to the availability of necessary resources, the provisions of the Conservation Plan annexed to the MoU
4. Facilitate the expeditious exchange of scientific, technical and legal information needed to coordinate conservation measures; and cooperate with recognized scientists of international organizations and other range States in order to facilitate their work conducted in relation to the Conservation Plan
5. Assess the implementation of the MoU and Conservation Plan at regular meetings
6. Provide the secretariat an annual report on the implementation of the MoU and Conservation Plan

The MoU took effect on 1 July 1999 and shall remain in effect indefinitely subject to the right of any Signatory to terminate its participation by providing one year's written notice to all of the other Signatories.

== Meetings ==
Meetings of Signatories are organized regularly to review the conservation status of the marine turtles and the implementation of the MoU and Conservation Plan. National reports by individual Signatories and a report prepared by the Secretariat are also submitted.

The First Meeting of Signatories took place in the UNEP Headquarters, Nairobi, Kenya, May 2002. A Conservation Plan, which had been drafted at the previous meeting, was revised and adopted.

The Second Meeting of Signatories was held in Dakar, Senegal, 5–7 March 2008. During the meeting the Signatories reviewed the implementation of the MoU, updated the Conservation Plan and established a Consultative Committee on Science and Technology. Furthermore, the second meeting amended the MoU in order to:

- Establish an Advisory Committee
- Encourage the CMS Secretariat to take necessary measures for effective regional coordination of the MoU
- Recall the decisions and accord reached during the first Meeting of Signatories and make explicitly clear in the text of the MoU that this instrument is open to all States with impacts on marine turtles and relevant interests in the region

The Third Meeting of Signatories was held in Saly, Senegal, 4-5 September 2023 as part of the CMS Marine Megafauna Week: Atlantic Coast of Africa. During the meeting the National Reports were reviewed, the Conservation and Management Plan revised and the Saly Declaration for the Conservation of Marine Megafauna Species on the Atlantic Coast of Africa was adopted.

== Secretariat ==
The CMS Secretariat — located in Bonn, Germany — provides the Secretariat functions. From October 2005 until the end of July 2012 the coordination services for the MoU were provided by the Coordination Unit known by its French acronym URTOMA. Since August 2012, the administration of the MoU has been shifted to the CMS Secretariat in Bonn until other arrangements can be found.

== Conservation and Management Plan ==
In May 2002, the range States gathered in Nairobi to conclude a comprehensive Conservation Plan. The text of the MoU states that the Plan shall aim to improve basic knowledge of species and migration routes, reduce mortality of marine turtles, enhance cooperation among range States and secure funding for the initiation and/or continuation of conservation programmes; the Plan shall also provide for the identification of key habitats for nesting and foraging, for population monitoring a research and the eventual preparation of national marine turtle action plans that take into account the needs of local human populations.

The Conservation Plan, adopted in 2002 and revised, focuses on the establishment of a database on turtle ecology (distribution, migration patterns, etc.) and on threats (mature and extent of direct exploitation, by-catch rate, impact of coastal management, pollution, etc.). The Plan was updated after the 3rd Meeting of Signatories in Senegal in 2023 based on the priorities and issues identified through the National Reports submitted by Signatory States. The revision includes structural changes and the addition of two new objectives regarding improving of knowledge around turtle distribution and threats.

== Activities and Successes ==
The CMS Secretariat has published the report “Conservation Measures for Marine Turtles of the Atlantic Coast of Africa: CMS Technical Series Publication No.5”, a comprehensive data review on the status of marine turtles of the Atlantic Coast .

Furthermore, the MoU has supported a number of small-scale project activities in various countries, with a view to stimulating broader initiative and supported the development of basic training and awareness materials such as the funding of the production of French language marine turtle identification posters developed by WIDECAST, an NGO working on turtle conservation in the Caribbean. On a more practical level, through the MoU a project, which started in 2001 and was successfully concluded in 2003, was funded. The project aimed at uncovering the migratory patterns of the Green Turtle population nesting at Poilão, Guinea-Bissau.

== See also ==
- Convention on Migratory Species of Wild Animals
- Marine Turtles in Indian Ocean and South East Asia MoU
- Sea turtles
