= Research Moored Array for African-Asian-Australian Monsoon Analysis and Prediction =

Monsoon data gathering system

The Research Moored Array for African-Asian-Australian Monsoon Analysis and Prediction (RAMA) is a system of moored observation buoys in the Indian Ocean that collects meteorological and oceanographic data. The data collected by RAMA will greatly enhance the ability of scientists to understand climatic events and predict monsoon events. Climatic and oceanic events in the Indian Ocean affect weather and climate throughout the rest of the world (such as El Niño, hurricanes, and United States weather), so RAMA will support weather forecasting and climate research worldwide. Although widely supported internationally, the system has only been partially implemented (as of 2012) due to pirate activity off the coast of Somalia.

== Aims and objectives ==
Although the data coverage for the Indian Ocean has been poor, it has not been non-existent. Satellites have been taking measurements, but those measurements require validation in situ. Some nations, like India and Australia, operate national ocean observing programs. Researchers have mounted observing equipment on ships of opportunity to take measurements. Also, the Argo float system has taken data in the Indian Ocean. What RAMA will contribute is large scale, long term data with high temporal resolution. High temporal resolution will allow rapid changes to be captured. With the installation of RAMA, the Indian Ocean will have a basin-wide observing system similar to TAO/TRITON in the Pacific Ocean and PIRATA in the tropical Atlantic. RAMA will complete the worldwide network of tropical ocean observing buoys, which will help with modeling and forecasting. The data RAMA collects will facilitate the study of "ocean-atmosphere interactions, mixed layer dynamics, and ocean circulation related to the monsoon on intraseasonal to decadal time scales."

== Scale ==
When complete RAMA will have 46 moored buoys, each of which is designed to be serviced annually. 38 are to be surface buoys and eight are subsurface ones. There are four types of moored buoys:

- Surface moorings equipped with instruments to measure air temperature, relative humidity, wind velocity, downwelling shortwave radiation, rainfall, sea surface temperature, conductivity, and pressure. Sea surface temperature and conductivity can be used together to calculate salinity.
- Enhanced surface moorings with extra instruments to "more precisely define surface heat, moisture, and momentum fluxes" in addition to downwelling longwave radiation and barometric pressure.
- Five subsurface Acoustic Doppler Current Profiler buoys to measure current velocity between 300–400 meters deep and 30–40 meters deep. They would provide faulty measurements in waters shallower than 30–40 meters because of backscatter from the ocean surface.
- Three subsurface, deep ocean moorings to measure currents between 1000 meters and 4000 meters deep.

Data obtained from the buoys is beamed to the Global Telecommunications System using the Service Argos Satellite Relay System. From there, it is distributed to agencies that require that information, such as weather centers. All of the data is free to access.

== Progress ==
By the end of 2008, 22 of the 46 buoys were in position, and the system was expected to be fully implemented by 2012. However, pirate activity off the coast of Somalia has jeopardized the completion of the project. Shipping insurers require special insurance to enter the piracy regions, which covers a large portion of the Indian Ocean. As of July 2011, 30 of the 46 moored buoys were established, but "13 of the remaining 16 are in the insurer's exclusion zone". Some buoys have even been shot at. While satellite data can still give enough information to make monsoon predictions, climate system studies will be affected by the gap in information.

== Data provided ==
Despite the system being incomplete, it has already begun providing valuable data. Farmers in Australia were able to use the data provided by RAMA to prepare for a bad growing season in 2008. It has also helped correct improper satellite measurements of surface heat flux.
