= Tropical Atmosphere Ocean project =

Meteorological project in the Pacific Ocean

The Tropical Atmosphere Ocean (TAO) project is a major international effort that instrumented the entire tropical Pacific Ocean, with approximately 70 deep ocean moorings. The development of the TAO array in 1985 was motivated by the 1982-1983 El Niño event and ultimately designed for the study of year-to-year climate variations related to El Niño and the Southern Oscillation (ENSO). Led by the TAO Project Office of the Pacific Marine Environmental Laboratory (PMEL), the full array of 70 moorings was completed in 1994.

The completed TAO array provides in-situ data collection of high quality oceanographic and surface meteorological data for monitoring, forecasting, and understanding of climate swings associated with El Niño and La Nina. In January 2000, the TAO array was renamed the TAO/TRITON array in recognition of the contribution made by the TRITON (Triangle Trans-Ocean Buoy Network) moorings. The TRITON moorings are situated along, and to the west of, 156E and are operated and managed by JAMSTEC.

== TAO/TRITON Array ==
The TAO/TRITON array has been the dominant source of upper ocean temperature data near the equator over the past 25 years. The TAO/TRITON array consists of approximately 70 moorings in the tropical Pacific Ocean that measure surface meteorological and subsurface oceanic parameters. All data are transmitted to shore in real-time via the Argos System of satellites. The moorings include NOAA TAO moorings in the eastern and central Pacific Ocean, and Japanese TRITON moorings in the western Pacific Ocean.

The TAO/TRITON moorings measure winds, sea surface temperature, relative humidity, air temperature, and subsurface temperature at 10 depths in the upper 500 m. Five moorings along the equator measure ocean velocity. The TAO moorings are serviced by NOAA's research ship, the KA'IMIMOANA, which is dedicated to implementing and maintaining the TAO project. Japan maintains the TRITON moorings in the western Pacific Ocean.

The array is a major component of global ocean and global climate observing systems including the El Niño/Southern Oscillation (ENSO) Observing System, the Global Climate Observing System (GCOS) and the Global Ocean Observing System (GOOS). The TAO/TRITON array project is supported by America thru NOAA, from Japan by JAMSTEC, and France contributes via IRD.

The TAO/TRITON array readings and outputs are updated daily and are publicly available as data and graphic displays from the TAO project page where complementary data sets are also available.

== TAO/TRITON Moorings ==
The TAO array consists of the Next Generation ATLAS (Autonomous Temperature Line Acquisition System) moorings. Prior to the Next Generation ATLAS moorings, the standard ATLAS moorings were used for the array. A notable improvement to the Next Generation ATLAS moorings were the inductively coupled sensors for subsurface data which simplified fabrication, and therefore, eliminated the themistor cable and its labor-intensive assembly and deployment procedures.

In a few locations, subsurface Acoustic Doppler Current Profiler (ADCP) moorings are deployed in tandem with nearby ATLAS moorings. ADCPs measure velocity profiles in the upper 200–300 m of the water column and data are available only after the subsurface moorings are recovered. Mooring recoveries are scheduled on an annual basis. The TAO surface mooring consists of a fiberglass-over-foam toroid, an aluminum tower, and a stainless steel bridle with an overall height of 4.9 m when completely rigged.

Between 2006 and 2008, the PMEL installed sea surface salinity (SSS) sensors on 55 ATLAS moorings to support NASA Aquaris and European Soil Moisture and Ocean Salinity (SMOS) surface salinity satellite missions and climate research.

The TRITON moorings consist of twelve conductivity and temperature sensors that are installed at depths of 1.5 m, 25 m, 50 m, 75 m, 100 m, 125 m, 150 m, 200 m, 250 m, 300 m, 500 m and 750 m. A single current meter is at 10 m, and surface meteorological sensors are mounted on the tower of the mooring. Other sensors on TRITON moorings measure temperature, salinity, wind speed and direction, air temperature and relative humidity, short-wave radiation, and rainfall.

=== Sampling ===
Near-real-time daily-averaged surface and subsurface data from ATLAS moorings are provided by the TAO project office. The Next Generation ATLAS moorings measures various data including wind velocity components, air temperature, relative humidity, rain rate, shortwave and longwave radiation, barometric pressure, sea surface and subsurface temperature and conductivity, and current velocity. Prior to the Next Generation ATLAS moorings, the Standard ATLAS moorings measured wind velocity components, air temperature, relative humidity, sea surface temperature and subsurface temperature.

== See also ==
- Research Moored Array for African-Asian-Australian Monsoon Analysis and Prediction
- Prediction and Research Moored Array in the Atlantic
