= Atlantic Equatorial mode =

Quasiperiodic interannual climate pattern of the equatorial Atlantic Ocean

The Atlantic Equatorial Mode or Atlantic Niño is a quasiperiodic interannual climate pattern of the equatorial Atlantic Ocean. It is the dominant mode of year-to-year variability that results in alternating warming and cooling episodes of sea surface temperatures accompanied by changes in atmospheric circulation. The term Atlantic Niño comes from its close similarity with the El Niño-Southern Oscillation (ENSO) that dominates the tropical Pacific basin. For this reason, the Atlantic Niño is often called the little brother of El Niño. The Atlantic Niño usually appears in northern summer, and is not the same as the Atlantic Meridional (Interhemispheric) Mode that consists of a north-south dipole across the equator and operates more during northern spring. The equatorial warming and cooling events associated with the Atlantic Niño are known to be strongly related to rainfall variability over the surrounding continents, especially in West African countries bordering the Gulf of Guinea. Therefore, understanding of the Atlantic Niño (or lack thereof) has important implications for climate prediction in those regions. Although the Atlantic Niño is an intrinsic mode to the equatorial Atlantic, there may be a tenuous causal relationship between ENSO and the Atlantic Niño in some circumstances.

== Background and structure ==
Global tropical variability is dominated by ENSO in the equatorial Pacific. This phenomenon results from air-sea interaction, producing a coupled atmosphere-ocean system that oscillates with periods on the order of three to five years. However, the physical basis for this oscillation is not limited strictly to the Pacific basin, and indeed, a very similar mode of variability exists in the equatorial Atlantic, albeit on a smaller scale.

The Atlantic Niño is characterized by a sea surface temperature anomaly centered on the equator between 0° and 30°W. Unlike its Pacific counterpart, the Atlantic Niño does not have sea surface temperature anomalies that switch sign from east to west, but rather a single basin-wide anomaly. Additionally, the amplitude of the Atlantic Niño tends to be about half that of El Niño. Not surprisingly, this sea surface temperature anomaly is closely related to a change in the climatological trade winds. A warm anomaly is associated with relaxed trade winds across a large swath of the equatorial Atlantic basin, while a cool anomaly is associated with enhanced easterly wind stress in the same region. These trade wind fluctuations can be understood as the weakening and strengthening of the Atlantic Walker circulation. This is strikingly similar to the wind stress anomalies seen in the Pacific during El Niño (or La Niña) events, although centered farther west in the Atlantic basin. A major difference between El Niño and the Atlantic Niño is that the sea surface temperature anomalies are strictly constrained to the equator in the Atlantic case, while greater meridional extent is observed in the Pacific.

While the spatial characteristics of the mature Atlantic Niño are quite similar to its Pacific counterpart, its temporal variability is somewhat different. The Atlantic Niño varies on interannual timescales like El Niño but also shows more variance on seasonal and annual timescales. That is to say, the Atlantic Niño explains a smaller portion of the total variance in the equatorial Atlantic than does El Niño in the equatorial Pacific. This is because seasonal climate events are superimposed on interannual variability. The Atlantic Niño typically reaches a mature phase in boreal summer (though there are exceptions), while El Niño matures in boreal winter. The development of the Atlantic Niño tends to be marked by emerging stationary patterns centered mid-basin. This is in stark contrast to El Niño, which can often develop as warm sea surface temperature anomalies that migrate west from the coast of South America or migrate east from the central Pacific.

== Impact on African climate ==
Warming or cooling of the equatorial oceans has understandable consequences for atmospheric climate. The equatorial oceans comprise a major portion of the overall heat budget and, therefore, alter convective regimes near the equator. In the case of the Pacific El Niño, enhanced convection over the central Pacific and reduced convection over the Maritime Continent fundamentally change climate not just in the tropics, but globally. Since the Atlantic Niño is physically similar to ENSO, we might expect climate impacts from it as well. However, given its reduced size both spatially (the Atlantic basin is much smaller than the Pacific basin) and in magnitude, the climate impacts of the Atlantic Niño are best seen in the tropical and subtropical regions nearest to the equatorial Atlantic.

The impact of the Atlantic Niño on African climate can be best understood by assessing how above normal equatorial sea surface temperatures impact the seasonal migration of the Intertropical Convergence Zone (ITCZ). Warm equatorial sea surface temperatures lower surface air pressure which induces more equatorward flow than normal. This, in turn, prevents the ITCZ from migrating as far north as it would under normal conditions during the summer, reducing rainfall in the semi-arid Sahel to the north, and increasing rainfall in regions along the Gulf of Guinea. Increased rainfall relative to normal is typically associated with negative temperature anomalies over these tropical land areas. Some evidence suggests that a warming trend in Indian Ocean equatorial sea surface temperatures contributes to long-term drying of the Sahel, which is exacerbated by periodic warming of the equatorial Atlantic related to the Atlantic Niño. In fact, the ability to predict the Atlantic Niño is a major research question given its impact on seasonal climate.

== Relationship between El Niño and the Atlantic Niño ==
Global tropical variability is largely dominated by the Pacific El Niño, leaving as a valid question whether the Atlantic Niño might be a remote impact of El Niño. There is no apparent contemporaneous relationship between the two, but such a statement is not necessarily useful considering that El Niño peaks in winter while the Atlantic Niño peaks in summer. Lagged analyzes reveal that the most prominent El Niño impact on the tropical Atlantic the following spring and summer is a warm sea surface temperature anomaly centered north of the Atlantic Niño region. This again appears to suggest that there is not causal relationship. However, more rigorous analysis suggests that the competition between cooling that results from increased wind stress and warming that results from increased air temperature, both of which are remote impacts of El Niño on the Atlantic, accounts for a tenuous relationship. When one of these processes dominates over the other, an Atlantic Niño (warm or cool) event could ensue. This is of major interest considering the challenge in seasonal prediction of the Atlantic Niño.

== Spatiotemporal diversity of Atlantic Niño ==
Not all Atlantic Niño events are alike. Some appear earlier than others or persists longer. These variabilities during the onset and dissipation phases are well captured by the four most recurring Atlantic Niño flavors or varieties (i.e., early-terminating, persistent, early-onset and late-onset varieties). Largely consistent with the differences in the timings of onset and dissipation, these four varieties display remarkable differences in rainfall response over West Africa and South America. In particular, the persistent and late-onset varieties are characterized by strong equatorial Atlantic sea surface temperature anomalies that remain until the end of the year. Thus, they are linked to an extended period of increased rainfall over the West Africa sub-Sahel region (July - October). In comparison, the early-terminating and early-onset varieties are linked to a limited period of increased rainfall over the West Africa sub-Sahel region (July - August). Most of the varieties are subject to onset mechanisms that involve preconditioning in boreal spring by either the Atlantic Meridional Mode (early-terminating variety) or Pacific El Niño (persistent and early-onset varieties), while for the late onset variability there is no clear source of external forcing.

== See also ==
- Climate cycle
- Teleconnection
- Benguela Niño
- Equatorial Counter Current
- Western Hemisphere Warm Pool
