= Memorandum of Understanding on the Conservation and Management of Marine Turtles and their Habitats of the Indian Ocean and South-East Asia =

Intergovernmental agreement

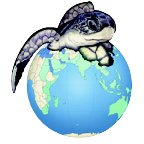
IOSEA Marine Turtle MoU logo

The Memorandum of Understanding on the Conservation and Management of Marine Turtles and their Habitats of the Indian Ocean and South-East Asia (IOSEA) is an intergovernmental agreement came into effect on 1 September 2001 under the auspices of the Convention on the Conservation of Migratory Species of Wild Animals. The aim of the MOU is to protect, conserve, replenish and recover sea turtles and their habitats in the Indian Ocean and South-East Asianregion. The MOU acts as a framework through which States, Terrirories, inter- and non- governmental stakeholderes of the Indian Ocean and South- East Asian region, as well as other concerned States, can coordinate their marine turtle conservation activities. This is achieved through the collective implementation of the IOSEA Conservation and Management Plan (CMP). It focuses on reducing threats, conserving critical habitat, exchanging scientific data, increasing public awareness and participation, promoting regional cooperation, and seeking resources for implementation. The plan is implemented through the Work Programme.

Major threats to marine turtles include unsustainable exploitation, destruction of nesting and feeding habitats, and incidental mortality in fishing operations.

== Protected Species ==
The turtle species currently protected by the memorandum are:

- Loggerhead turtle, Caretta caretta
- Olive ridley turtle, Lepidochelys olivacea
- Green turtle, Chelonia mydas
- Hawksbill turtle, Eretmochelys imbricata
- Leatherback turtle, Dermochelys coriacea
- Flatback turtle, Natator depressus

== Territory ==
Waters and coastal states of the Indian Ocean and South-East Asia and adjacent seas, extending eastwards to the Torres Strait. For implementation purposes, the area is divided into four sub-regions: South-East Asia + (SEA+), Northern Indian Ocean, Northwestern Indian Ocean, and Western Indian Ocean. States, located on the territory of the Agreement, are the following: Australia, Bahrain, Bangladesh, Brunei Darussalam, Cambodia, China, Comores, Djibouti, Egypt, Eritrea, France, India, Indonesia, Islamic Republic of Iran, Japan, Jordan, Kenya, Kuwait, Madagascar, Malaysia, Maldives, Mauritius, Mozambique, Myanmar, Oman, Pakistan, Papua New Guinea, Philippines, Qatar, Republic of Korea, Saudi Arabia, Seychelles, Singapore, Somalia, South Africa, Sri Lanka, Sudan, Thailand, Timor Leste, United Arab Emirates, United Republic of Tanzania, United Kingdom, Vietnam, Yemen. The United States of America also participated in the Memorandum of Understanding.

== Signatories ==
As of November 2026, 36 states have signed the memorandum. The list of the countries is found below with the dates of the signature in the parentheses:

- Australia (23 June 2001)
- Bahrain (10 December 2006)
- Bangladesh (23 October 2003)
- Cambodia (12 December 2002)
- Comoros (23 June 2001)
- Egypt (17.02.2014)
- Eritrea (24 November 2005)
- France (5 December 2008)
- India (20 February 2007)
- Indonesia (31 March 2005)
- Islamic Republic of Iran (23 June 2001)
- Jordan (18 March 2004)
- Kenya (9 May 2002)
- Kuwait (27.06.2014)
- Madagascar (22 January 2003)
- Malaysia (19 September 2011)
- Maldives (26 April 2010)
- Mauritius (12 July 2002)
- Mozambique (5 December 2008)
- Myanmar (23 June 2001)
- Oman (16 March 2004)
- Pakistan (12 July 2004)
- Papua New Guinea (10 September 2010)
- Philippines (23 June 2001)
- Saudi Arabia (3 August 2005)
- Seychelles (22 January 2003)
- South Africa (22 February 2005)
- Sri Lanka (23 June 2001)
- Sudan (17.02.2014)
- Thailand (12 May 2004)
- United Arab Emirates (18 January 2007)
- United Kingdom (27 March 2002)
- United Republic of Tanzania (23 June 2001)
- United States of America (23 June 2001)
- Viet Nam (24 July 2001)
- Yemen (1 November 2008)

The intent is that it will remain open for signature indefinitely.

== Secretariat ==
Since 2017, the IOSEA Marine Turtle MOU is coordinated by the Secretariat of the Convention of Migratory Species (CMS), located in Bonn, Germany. From 2001 until 2016 the Secretariat had been based in Bangkok, at the UN Environment Regional Office for Asia and the Pacific (ROAP). The Secretariat facilitates activities, encourages reporting and assists communication between and among Signatory States, sub-regional institutions and organisations. It organises the reoccurring Meeting of Signatories (MOS), of the Advisory Committee (AC), subregional Task Forces and initiatives.

== See also ==
- Convention on Migratory Species
- Sea turtles
- Atlantic Coast of Africa Turtle MOU
