= London Convention on the Prevention of Marine Pollution by Dumping of Wastes and Other Matter =

1972 multilateral environmental agreement

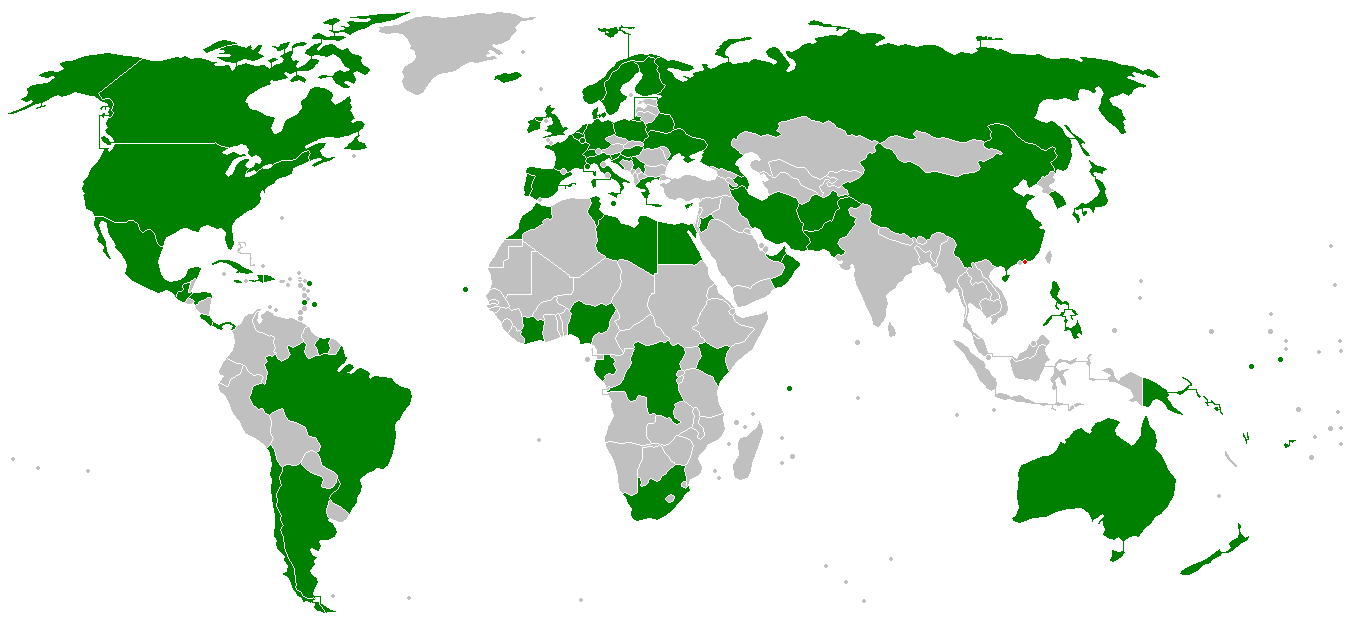
London Convention signatories

The Convention on the Prevention of Marine Pollution by Dumping of Wastes and Other Matter 1972, commonly called the "London Convention" or "LC '72" and also abbreviated as Marine Dumping, is an agreement to control pollution of the sea by dumping and to encourage regional agreements supplementary to the convention. It covers the deliberate disposal at sea of wastes or other matter from vessels, aircraft, and platforms. It does not cover discharges from land-based sources such as pipes and outfalls, wastes generated incidental to normal operation of vessels, or placement of materials for purposes other than mere disposal, providing such disposal is not contrary to aims of the convention. It entered into force in 1975. As of September 2016, there were 89 Parties to the convention.

== Background ==
The convention was called for by the United Nations Conference on the Human Environment (June 1972, Stockholm), the treaty was drafted at the Intergovernmental Conference on the Convention on the Dumping of Wastes at Sea (13 November 1972, London) and it was opened for signature on 29 December 1972. It entered into force on 30 August 1975 when 15 nations ratified. As of 1 October 2001, there were 78 Contracting Parties to the convention. International Administration of the Convention functions through Consultative Meetings held at International Maritime Organization (IMO) headquarters in London.

The London Convention consists of 22 Articles and three Annexes. It follows a "black list/grey list" approach to regulating ocean dumping; Annex I materials (black list) generally may not be ocean dumped (though for certain Annex I materials dumping may be permissible if present only as "trace contaminants" or "rapidly rendered harmless" and Annex II materials (grey list) require "special care". Annex III lays out general technical factors to be considered in establishing criteria for issuance of ocean dumping permits.

The main objective of the London Convention is to prevent indiscriminate disposal at sea of wastes that could be liable for creating hazards to human health; harming living resources and marine life; damaging amenities; or interfering with other legitimate uses of the sea. The 1972 Convention extends its scope over "all marine waters other than the internal waters" of the States and prohibits the dumping of certain hazardous materials. It further requires a prior special permit for the dumping of a number of other identified materials and a prior general permit for other wastes or matter.

== Implementation ==
Since its entering into force in 1975, the convention has provided a framework for international control and prevention of marine pollution within which the contracting parties have achieved continuous progress in keeping the oceans clean. Among its milestones are the 1993 ban on ocean disposal of low-level radioactive wastes and the resolutions to end the dumping and incineration of industrial wastes. The efforts of the Parties are supported by a permanent secretariat hosted by the International Maritime Organization (IMO). The consultative meeting of the contracting parties to the London convention is the governing and political decision-making body of the convention. It takes advice on issues needing multidisciplinary expertise from the Joint Group of Experts on Scientific Aspects of Marine Environmental Protection (GESAMP) which is composed of specialised experts nominated by the IMO, FAO, UNESCO, IOC, WMO, WHO, IAEA, UN, and UNEP. A scientific group on dumping, composed of government experts from the parties to the convention a responsible to address any scientific requests from the consultative meeting, including the preparation of lists of hazardous substances, developing guide-lines on the implementation of the convention, and maintaining awareness of the impacts on the marine environments of inputs from all waste sources.

The convention is implemented in the United States through Title I of the Marine Protection, Research, and Sanctuaries Act (MPRSA) which directs that implementing regulations are to apply binding requirements of LC to the extent that this would not relax the MPRSA.

=== 1996 Protocol ===
On 17 November 1996, a special meeting of the Contracting Parties adopted the "1996 Protocol to the Convention on the Prevention of Marine Pollution by Dumping of Wastes and Other Matter, 1972" which is to replace the 1972 Convention, subject to ratification. In line with UNCED's Agenda 21, the 1996 Protocol reflects the global trend towards precaution and prevention with the parties agreeing to move from controlled dispersal at sea of a variety of land-generated wastes towards integrated land-based solutions for most, and controlled sea disposal of few, remaining categories of wastes or other matter.

Among the most important innovations brought by the 1996 protocol is the codification of the "precautionary approach" and the "polluter pays principle." Reflecting these principles, the protocol embodies a major structural revision of the convention the so-called "reverse list" approach. Now, instead of prohibiting the dumping of certain (listed) hazardous materials, the parties are obligated to prohibit the dumping of any waste or other matter that is not listed in Annex 1 ("the reverse list") of the 1996 protocol. Dumping of wastes or other matter on this reverse list requires a permit. Parties to the protocol are further obligated to adopt measures to ensure that the issuance of permits and permit conditions for the dumping of reverse list substances comply with Annex 2 (the Waste Assessment Annex) of the protocol. The substances on the reverse list include dredged material; sewage sludge; industrial fish processing waste; vessels and offshore platforms or other man-made structures at sea; inert, inorganic geological material; organic material of natural origin; and bulky items including iron, steel, concrete and similar materials for which the concern is physical impact, and limited to those circumstances where such wastes are generated at locations with no land-disposal alternatives. In addition, the 1996 protocol prohibits altogether the practice of incineration at sea, except for emergencies, and prohibits the exports of wastes or other matter to non-Parties for the purpose of dumping or incineration at sea.

The 1996 protocol has effectively moved the scope of the original London convention landwards, relating it to the policy and management issues of land as well as sea wastes disposal. Indicative for this shift are such elements as the codification of the precautionary approach and the establishment of requirements such as the "waste prevention audit," the identification and control of the sources of contamination for certain materials, and the collaboration with relevant local and national agencies that are involved in point and non-point source pollution control. In this context, integrated coastal management (ICM) comes as a natural framework for effective implementation of the objectives of the protocol. Relaying on its vast ICM technical expertise, the National Ocean Service (NOS) is to contribute to the creation of the necessary foundation for the US accession to the 1996 Protocol and, further on, to the protocol's implementation. Through its International Program Office, NOS would also contribute to the international co-operation efforts towards meeting the objectives of the 1996 Protocol.

The legal interpretation about carbon capture and storage (CCS) is uncertain. The sub-seabed wastes fall within the scope of the treaty, which can prohibit CCS projects like the injection of CO_{2} into offshore platforms built into sub-seabed geological formations.

== Parties ==
State parties – (87 as of 2013) Afghanistan, Angola, Antigua and Barbuda, Argentina, Australia, Azerbaijan, Barbados, Belarus (ratified as Byelorussian SSR), Belgium, Benin, Bolivia, Brazil, Bulgaria, Canada, Cape Verde, Chile, People's Republic of China, Democratic Republic of the Congo, Costa Rica, Côte d'Ivoire, Croatia, Cuba, Cyprus, Denmark, Dominican Republic, Egypt, Equatorial Guinea, Finland, France, Gabon, Germany, Greece, Guatemala, Haiti, Honduras, Hungary, Iceland, Iran, Ireland, Italy, Jamaica, Japan (ratified but w/ exclusion), Jordan, Kenya, Kiribati, South Korea, Libya, Luxembourg, Malta, Mexico, Monaco, Montenegro, Morocco, Nauru, Netherlands, New Zealand, Nigeria, Norway, Oman, Pakistan, Panama, Papua New Guinea, Peru, Philippines, Poland, Portugal, Russia (ratified as the Soviet Union), Saint Lucia, Saint Vincent and the Grenadines, Serbia (ratified as Serbia and Montenegro), Seychelles, Sierra Leone, Slovenia, Solomon Islands, South Africa, Spain, Suriname, Sweden, Switzerland, Syria, Tanzania, Tonga, Tunisia, Ukraine (ratified as Ukrainian SSR), United Arab Emirates, United Kingdom, United States, and Vanuatu. (Insert Reference).

== Cases ==
Japan's 2023 release of water from a damaged nuclear power plant into the Pacific Ocean raised questions for the Governing Bodies of the London Convention (LC) and its Protocol (LP) and the Fukushima District Court as to whether the action constituted dumping under Article 4. In 2021 the Governing Bodies received concerns about the release from Greenpeace International, South Korea, as well as Japan asking whether the prohibition to dump radioactive materials from "man-made structures at sea" bans discharges from land-based pipelines protruding into the sea. The London Convention Secretariat explained on 29 July 2022 that "man-made structures at sea" is not currently defined by treaties, but interpretations including those based on the United Nations Convention on the Law of the Sea seem to exclude pipelines as land-based. On the other hand, the Legal Affairs Office of the International Maritime Organization said that parties to the LC/LP could decide whether protruding pipelines count as "other man-made structures at sea". This allows a teleological interpretation of the convention such that the goal of protecting the marine environment determines what is allowed or prohibited, even if the specific polluting pathway may vary.

== See also ==
- Barcelona Convention
- Convention for the Prevention of Marine Pollution by Dumping from Ships and Aircraft
- Environmental agreements
- MARPOL 73/78
- Operation CHASE
- Oslo Convention for the North-East Atlantic (OSPAR)
