= C3H6O3 =

The molecular formula C_{3}H_{6}O_{3} may refer to:

- Dihydroxyacetone
- Dimethyl carbonate
- Glyceraldehyde
- 3-Hydroxypropionic acid
- Lactic acid
- Trioxanes
  - 1,2,4-Trioxane
  - 1,3,5-Trioxane
