= Pellet Fuels Institute =

This is about a trade organization of wood

Pellet Fuels Institute (PFI) is a North American trade organization that represents manufacturers, retailers and distributors of wood pellet fuel supplies and appliances. The PFI was formed in 1985 as the Fiber Fuels Institute.

Headquartered in Arlington, Virginia, PFI maintains National Residential Pellet Fuel Standards, compiles and publishes data on sales and manufacturing output relating to the U.S. pellet fuel industry, hosts industry conferences, and provides outreach to consumers on the use of pellet fuel as an alternative energy thermal source.

The PFI joined many organizations such as The Alliance for Green Heat and Maine Energy Systems in working with Congress to amend the tax code through the Biomass Thermal Utilization Act (BUT Act), making renewable wood heating more affordable.
