= List of exports of South Korea =

Exports of South Korea by product category (2019) Chemical products Transportation Machines Mineral products Plastics and rubbers Metals Foodstuffs Precious metals Textiles Instruments Animal products Vegetable products Paper goods Footwear and headwear Miscellaneous Stone and glass Wood products Animal and vegetable bi-products Animal hides Arts and antiques Weapons

The following is a list of the exports of South Korea. Data is for 2012, in millions of United States dollars, as reported by The Observatory of Economic Complexity. Currently the top twenty exports are listed.

#	Country	Value
1	Refined petroleum	51,540
2	Integrated circuits	49,126
3	Cars	42,484
4	Passenger and Cargo Ships	29,010
5	LCDs	23,978
6	Car parts	20,496
7	Broadcasting Equipment	15,443
8	Broadcasting Accessories	10,532
9	Telephones	10,417
10	Cyclic Hydrocarbons	8,791
11	Special Purpose Ships	8,117
12	Computers	6,340
13	Hot-Rolled Iron	6,288
14	Coated Flat-Rolled Iron	5,654
15	Semiconductor devices	5,210
16	Large Construction Vehicles	5,091
17	Polycarboxylic acids	4,833
18	Polyacetals	4,743
19	Machinery Having Individual Functions	4,621
20	Tires	4,614
