= 1992 in the environment =

This is a list of notable events relating to the environment in 1992. They relate to environmental law, conservation, environmentalism and environmental issues.

== Events ==
- The Intergovernmental Panel on Climate Change supplementary report of 1992 was published to contribute to the debate on the United Nations Framework Convention on Climate Change at the 1992 Earth Summit, held in Rio de Janeiro.
- Henry W. Kendall, a former chair of the Union of Concerned Scientists (UCS) board of directors, wrote "World Scientists' Warning to Humanity", which begins: "Human beings and the natural world are on a collision course." A majority of the Nobel Prize laureates in the sciences signed the document; about 1,700 of the world's leading scientists appended their signature.
- A moratorium is placed on the Northern Cod fishery by the Canadian government after a collapse in the annual harvested quantity.
- A number of protected areas were established in 1992, including Rambynas Regional Park in Lithuania, and El Angel Ecological Reserve in Ecuador.

=== January ===
- A storm in the North Pacific Ocean causes a shipping container containing 28,800 Friendly Floatees to be washed aboard. The resulting flotsam was later used to track ocean currents.

=== March ===
- The Mingbulak oil spill was a massive terrestrial oil spill at the Mingbulak oil field in the Fergana Valley, Uzbekistan. It was the worst oil spill in the history of Asia and the oil coming out of the well caught fire and burnt for two months.
- Mexico established the Comisión Nacional para el Conocimiento y Uso de la Biodiversidad (CONABIO; English: National Commission for the Knowledge and Use of Biodiversity). It completed a major report in 2005.
- The first annual World Sustainable Energy Days conference is organized.

=== April ===
- The Katina P, a Greek oil tanker carrying 72,000 tonnes of oil, sank off the Mozambique coast.

=== May ===
- The Basel Convention on the Control of Transboundary Movements of Hazardous Wastes and Their Disposal, usually known simply as the Basel Convention, enters into force. It is an international treaty that was designed to reduce the movements of hazardous waste between nations, and specifically to prevent transfer of hazardous waste from developed to less developed countries.

=== June ===
- The United Nations Conference on Environment and Development (UNCED), also known as the Rio Summit, Rio Conference, Earth Summit (Portuguese: Eco '92) was a major United Nations conference held in Rio de Janeiro.
- The Amendment Act on Reduction of Total Amount of Nitrogen Dioxide and Particulate Matters Originating from Automobiles in Designated Areasis passed in Japan, setting the maximum emissions of nitrogen dioxide (NOx) and particulate matters(PMs) allowed by trucks, buses, and diesel passenger vehicles.

=== September ===
- The Convention for the Protection of the Marine Environment of the North-East Atlantic (OSPAR) concludes in Paris, creating the OSPAR Commission.

=== December ===
- The Aegean Sea oil tanker exploded and caused an oil spill off the coast of Spain.

== See also ==
- Human impact on the environment
- List of environmental issues
- List of years in the environment
