= Environment of Ecuador =

The Environment of Ecuador contains almost 20,000 species of plants, 1,500 species of birds, 341 species of mammals and more than 840 species of reptiles and amphibians. It includes World Heritage Sites like the Galápagos Islands, and parks such as the Yasuni National Park.

Straddled across the Andes on the most westerly point of South America, Ecuador is about half size of France (271,000 sq.km/103,000 sq. Miles) making the smallest of the Andean countries.

The Andean mountain chain divides the country into three distinct regions: the coastal plain known as the costa, the Andean mountains, or sierra, and the Amazon jungle, or oriente. The fourth region the Galápagos Islands, a group of volcanic islands situated in the Pacific Ocean some 1,000km (620 miles) due west of the mainland.

== Damage to the environment ==
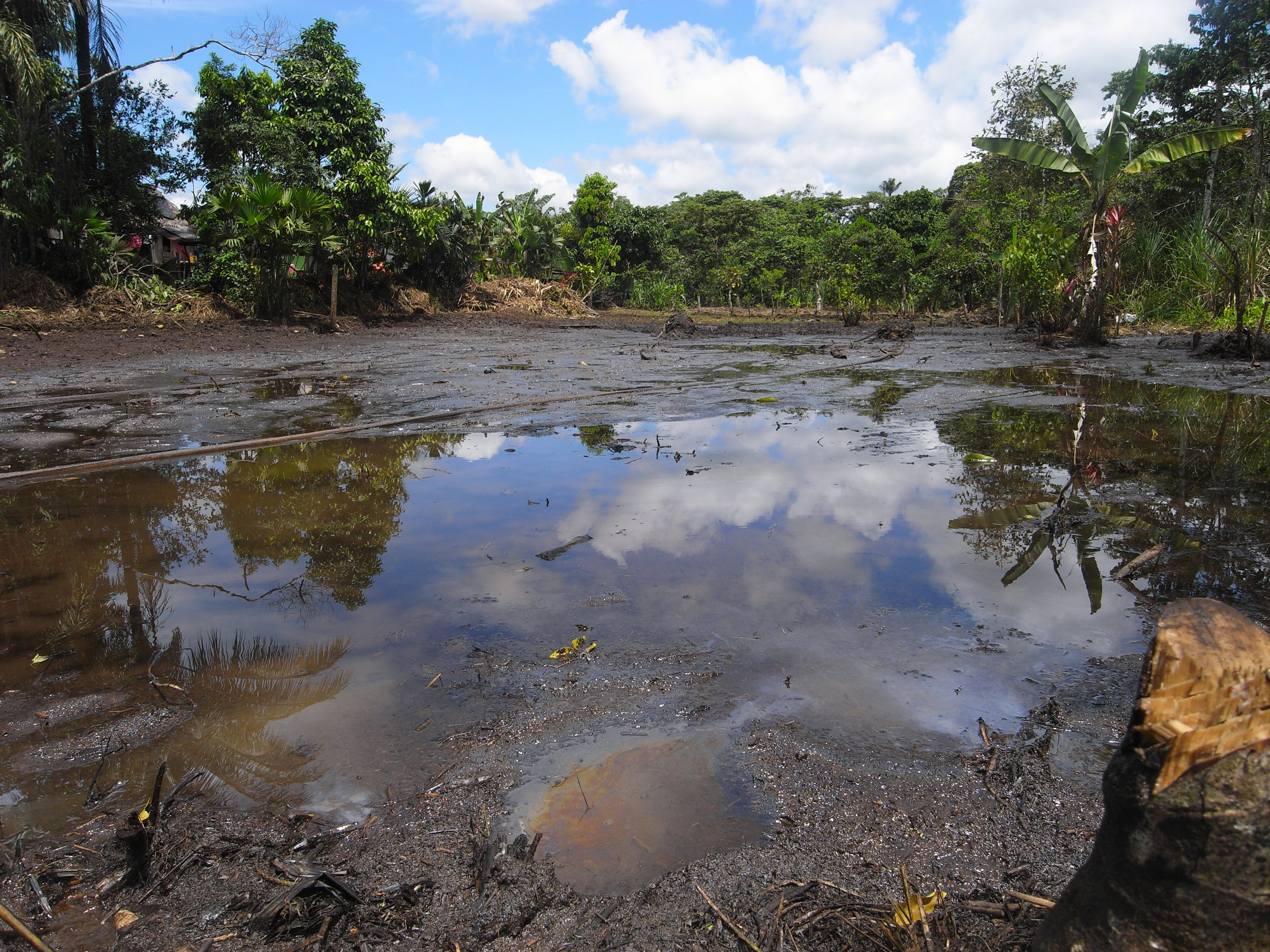
Oil pollution in the Lago Agrio oil field

Mining in Ecuador has come at a great environmental cost, though it has provided some financial revenue. Logging and oil exploitation are other major problems. In 2007, president Correa proposed the Yasuní-ITT Initiative so as to allow preserving the Yasuni national park, while still allowing to generate revenue for the country.

== Environmental performance ==
In the Yale University and Columbia University 10 Environmental Performance Index, Ecuador was ranked 30 in the world, ahead of some rich countries.

== Deforestation ==
Ecuador had a 2018 Forest Landscape Integrity Index mean score of 7.66/10, ranking it 35th globally out of 172 countries.

=== Tree cover extent and loss ===
Global Forest Watch publishes annual estimates of tree cover loss and 2000 tree cover extent derived from time-series analysis of Landsat satellite imagery in the Global Forest Change dataset. In this framework, tree cover refers to vegetation taller than 5 m (including natural forests and tree plantations), and tree cover loss is defined as the complete removal of tree cover canopy for a given year, regardless of cause.

For Ecuador, country statistics report cumulative tree cover loss of 1,060,479 ha (10,604.79 km^{2}) from 2001 to 2024 (about 5.6% of its 2000 tree cover area). For tree cover density greater than 30%, country statistics report a 2000 tree cover extent of 19,048,768 ha (190,487.68 km^{2}). The charts and table below display this data. In simple terms, the annual loss number is the area where tree cover disappeared in that year, and the extent number shows what remains of the 2000 tree cover baseline after subtracting cumulative loss. Forest regrowth is not included in the dataset.

Annual tree cover loss in Ecuador, 2001–2024. View chart definition.
Tree cover extent in 2000 minus cumulative tree cover loss in Ecuador, 2001–2024 (loss-only residual; does not account for gain). View chart definition.

Annual tree cover extent and loss
| Year | Tree cover extent (km2) (Note: This residual measure does not include forest regrowth.) | Annual tree cover loss (km2) |
|---|---|---|
| 2001 | 190,036.89 | 450.79 |
| 2002 | 189,738.43 | 298.46 |
| 2003 | 189,599.76 | 138.67 |
| 2004 | 189,226.92 | 372.84 |
| 2005 | 188,822.91 | 404.01 |
| 2006 | 188,466.44 | 356.47 |
| 2007 | 187,860.54 | 605.90 |
| 2008 | 187,341.14 | 519.40 |
| 2009 | 186,763.99 | 577.15 |
| 2010 | 186,425.77 | 338.22 |
| 2011 | 185,989.05 | 436.72 |
| 2012 | 185,246.01 | 743.04 |
| 2013 | 184,761.82 | 484.19 |
| 2014 | 184,452.47 | 309.35 |
| 2015 | 184,151.25 | 301.22 |
| 2016 | 183,710.33 | 440.92 |
| 2017 | 182,997.74 | 712.59 |
| 2018 | 182,610.26 | 387.48 |
| 2019 | 182,253.12 | 357.14 |
| 2020 | 181,763.48 | 489.64 |
| 2021 | 181,459.80 | 303.68 |
| 2022 | 180,933.62 | 526.18 |
| 2023 | 180,503.52 | 430.10 |
| 2024 | 179,882.89 | 620.63 |

=== REDD+ forest reference emission levels and monitoring ===
Under the UNFCCC REDD+ framework, Ecuador has submitted national forest reference emission levels (FRELs). On the UNFCCC REDD+ Web Platform, the country’s 2015 and 2020 submission packages are both listed as having assessed reference levels. For the 2015 package, a national strategy, safeguards information and a national forest monitoring system are listed as reported; for the 2020 package, the national strategy and safeguards are listed as reported, while the forest monitoring system is listed as “not reported”.

The first assessed national FREL, technically assessed in 2015, covered the REDD+ activity “reducing emissions from deforestation” at national scale. Using a historical reference period of 2000–2008, it was assessed at 43,418,126 t CO2 eq per year. The technical assessment states that the benchmark represented gross emissions from deforestation associated with clear-cuts, excluding subsequent emissions and removals from deforested areas, and that it included above-ground biomass, below-ground biomass, deadwood and litter, while excluding soil organic carbon and reporting CO2 only.

An updated national FREL was submitted in 2020 and assessed in 2023. It again covered only reducing emissions from deforestation, but used a longer historical reference period of 2001–2014 and was assessed at 23,949,392.40 t CO2 eq per year. The technical assessment notes that this second benchmark was lower than the earlier one mainly because the reference period was extended and new approaches were used to generate activity data. It continued to include above-ground biomass, below-ground biomass, deadwood and litter, while excluding soil organic carbon and reporting CO2 only. The assessment also reports that Ecuador applied a forest definition with a minimum area of 1 hectare, minimum tree height of 5 metres and minimum canopy cover of 30%, including natural and planted forests, bamboo areas and native palms, but excluding oil-palm and fruit-tree plantations.

== See also ==
- El Angel Ecological Reserve
- Water supply and sanitation in Ecuador
- Chevron Corporation § Environmental damage in Ecuador
