= Maine Energy Systems =

Maine Energy Systems (MESys) was founded in summer 2008 by Les Otten, Dutch Dresser, and others to aid in the transition to alternative energy in the northeastern United States. The company delivers wood pellets in bulk and sells fully automated wood pellet boilers for hydronic heating. MESys has been involved in numerous academic studies, work with political groups concerned with the environmental and economic aspects of residential and light commercial heating, and works with American regulatory bodies concerned with the safety of heating appliances.

== Viable alternative energy sources in Maine ==
80% of Maine residences are heated with fuel oil. In 2008 during a period of extraordinarily high oil prices former Maine Governor John Baldacci formed The Governor's Wood to Energy Task Force in order to determine the viability of biomass, and wood pellets in particular, as a fuel source for heating in Maine.

The Governor's Wood to Energy Task Force in 2008 published clear estimates by the Maine Forest Service that the forests of Maine are under-utilized and 5.8 million green tons per year could be sustainably harvested in Maine in addition to the 18.6 million tons per year currently harvested. The Maine Forest Service findings went on to report that an additional 3.8 million green tons per year could be harvested sustainably from New Hampshire and Massachusetts. If 10% of Maine's residences were converted to wood pellet fuel, it would require ~650,000 tons of green wood per year making large scale wood pellet heating a possibility in Maine. It is MESys's goal to make wood pellet fuel a primary heat source for a large number of residences in Maine.

Calculations on the economic impact of foreign oil on the Maine economy made by Co-Director and economist Dr. William "Bill" Strauss have been published. Bill Strauss' work "How to Cure Maine’s Addiction to Heating Oil" suggests that too much money is leaving the region as a result of foreign heating oil and that keeping some or all of the heating fuel revenues in the region through the use of wood pellet fuel would remedy this drain on the economy.

== Work with regulatory agencies ==
Much of Maine Energy Systems work to make wood pellet heating more prevalent in the Northeast has been with regulatory agencies. At the time MESys was founded very few regulations existed which directly referred to Wood Pellet boilers in Maine and the surrounding regions. As a result, rules and regulations created to regulate the installation and use of cordwood and coal stoker boilers were frequently applied to pellet boilers. Co-Owner Dr. Harry "Dutch" Dresser Jr. has been instrumental in helping to achieve parity in heating regulations between wood pellet heating appliances and conventional liquid and gaseous fuel appliances in some jurisdictions. Regulations which directly address wood pellet heat have existed for decades in various countries in Europe; the majority of new construction in Upper Austria is heated with wood pellet boilers. As wood pellet boilers gain use in the United States it is necessary that regulations be devised which directly address appropriate wood pellet boiler use. Currently the lack of wood pellet fuel based appliance regulations requires regulatory agencies to hold wood pellet boilers to standards established for a different solid fuel source, such as cordwood, even though the manually fed operation of a cordwood boiler bears no resemblance to the operation of an automatic wood pellet boiler. Regulatory changes that have been made to directly address wood pellet boilers through Maine Energy Systems involvement include the following:

The Maine DEP has found that some wood pellet boilers are suitable for EPA Phase II certification based on conversion of European test results achieved under EN 303-5 test standards. Vermont DEC certification is nearing completion as well at the time of this writing (August 2011) on the same basis . Use of these test results is forward looking, as US agencies are frequently reluctant to use non-US test standards. The testing considered for these certifications focuses primarily on particulate emissions for boilers installed in unoccupied buildings. The boilers issued certification have particulate emissions values nearly ten times lower than the US EPA requirements.

The Maine Fuels Board has spent nearly a year considering many of its solid fuel-related installation codes with the help of pellet boiler practitioners. The Board has recognized the actual attributes of modern pellet-fired boiler systems and is proposing modifications to its installation regulations that will bring virtual parity between the rules for automatic pellet fueled boilers and conventional liquid and gaseous fuel boilers.

== Work with academia ==
The carbon neutrality of wood pellet fuel has been the focus of academic discussions recently. A study by the Manomet group proposed a model on the effects of biomass energy on atmospheric carbon levels. With this model a carbon debt occurs at the time of harvest and a carbon dividend occurs as new trees replace the harvested ones. This model describes wood pellet heat as a less than carbon neutral energy source. MESys co-director and economist Bill Strauss has written a rebuttal to this study which was published in the July 2011 edition of Biomass Power & Thermal Magazine, claiming that there are other methods of modeling biomass energy and that they were not well enough explored in the Manomet study. Strauss claims that the chosen Manomet model ignores the carbon dividend accumulated prior to harvest by the trees being harvested.

MESys sponsored a Worcester Polytechnic Institute student Major Qualifying Project to find and design the best method for automated ash removal for a wood pellet boiler. The project used Axiomatic design as well as conventional design methods to fully explore the functions required of an ash removal system. Two systems were prototyped and tested; a screw conveyor system and a novel cyclonic separator and vacuum system.

== Globalism ==
Maine Energy Systems' involvement in the transition to wood pellet heat has required the development of global relationships with European businesses that have successful experience in the wood pellet heat industry. This year Maine Energy Systems directors Dutch Dresser and Bill Strauss were keynote speakers at The 2011 World Sustainable Energy Days Conference in Wels, Upper Austria.

MESys relations with Austrian business Tropper allowed the first fully pneumatic bulk pellet delivery truck in the United States to be built and used in Maine.

== Contractor training ==
Since 2008 Maine Energy Systems has offered free training to properly licensed technicians who wish to install and service wood pellet boilers. Training currently focuses on the Austrian OkoFEN AutoPellet pellet boiler and the Auto-Pellet Air hot air furnace, although in the past contractors were trained on the Swedish Janfire NH wood pellet burner.
