= Polyoxymethylene =

Engineering thermoplastic polymer

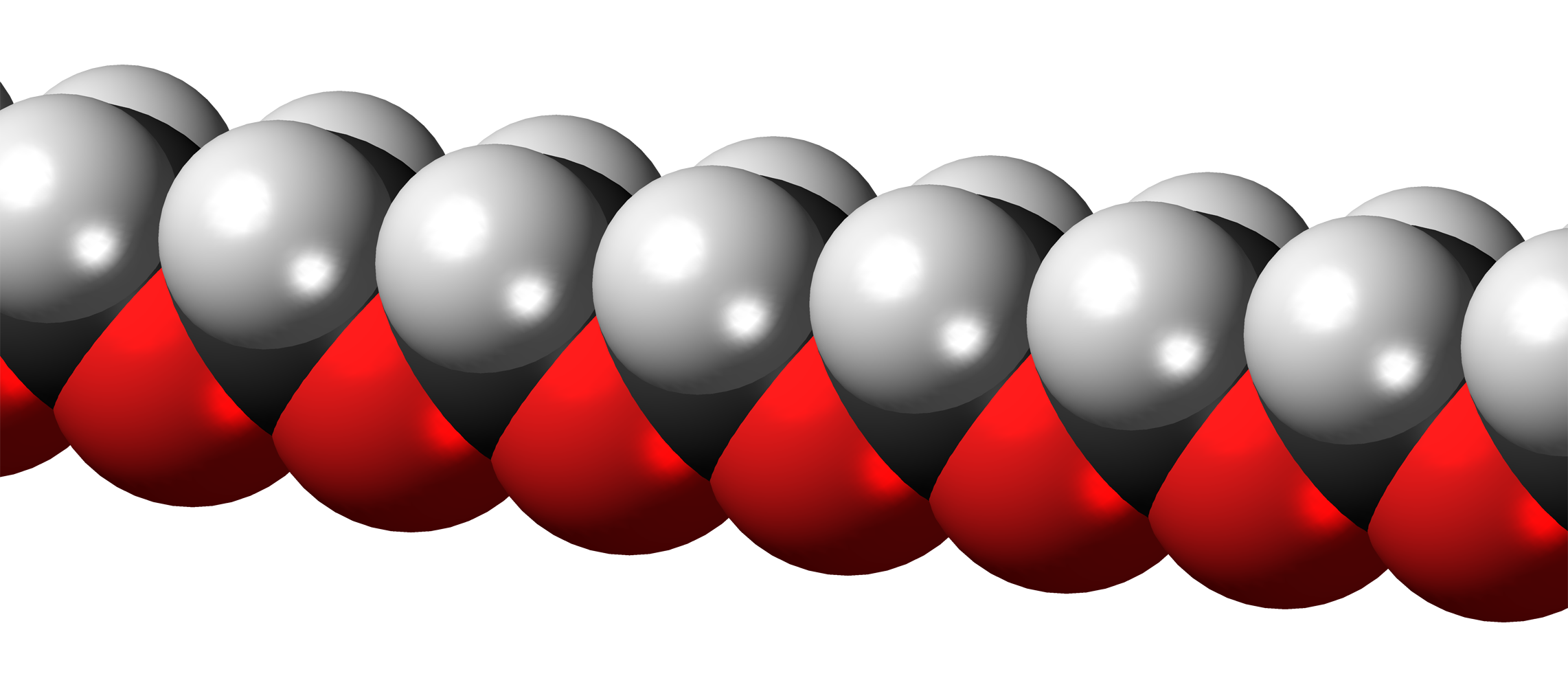

Names
- IUPAC name Polyoxymethylene
- Other names Poly(oxymethylene) glycol; polymethylene glycol

Identifiers
CAS Number	9002-81-7
ChemSpider	None
UNII	QHG55SH7ER
CompTox Dashboard (EPA)	DTXSID001010896

Properties
Chemical formula	(CH_{2}O)_{n}
Molar mass	Variable
Appearance	White solid (but can be dyed)
Density	1.41–1.42 g/cm^{3}
Melting point	175 °C (347 °F)
Electrical resistivity	14×10^{15} Ω⋅cm
Magnetic susceptibility (χ)	−9.36×10^{−6} (SI, at 22 °C)

Thermochemistry
Heat capacity (C)	1500 J/kg·K
- Except where otherwise noted, data are given for materials in their standard state (at 25 °C [77 °F], 100 kPa). verify (what is ?) Infobox references

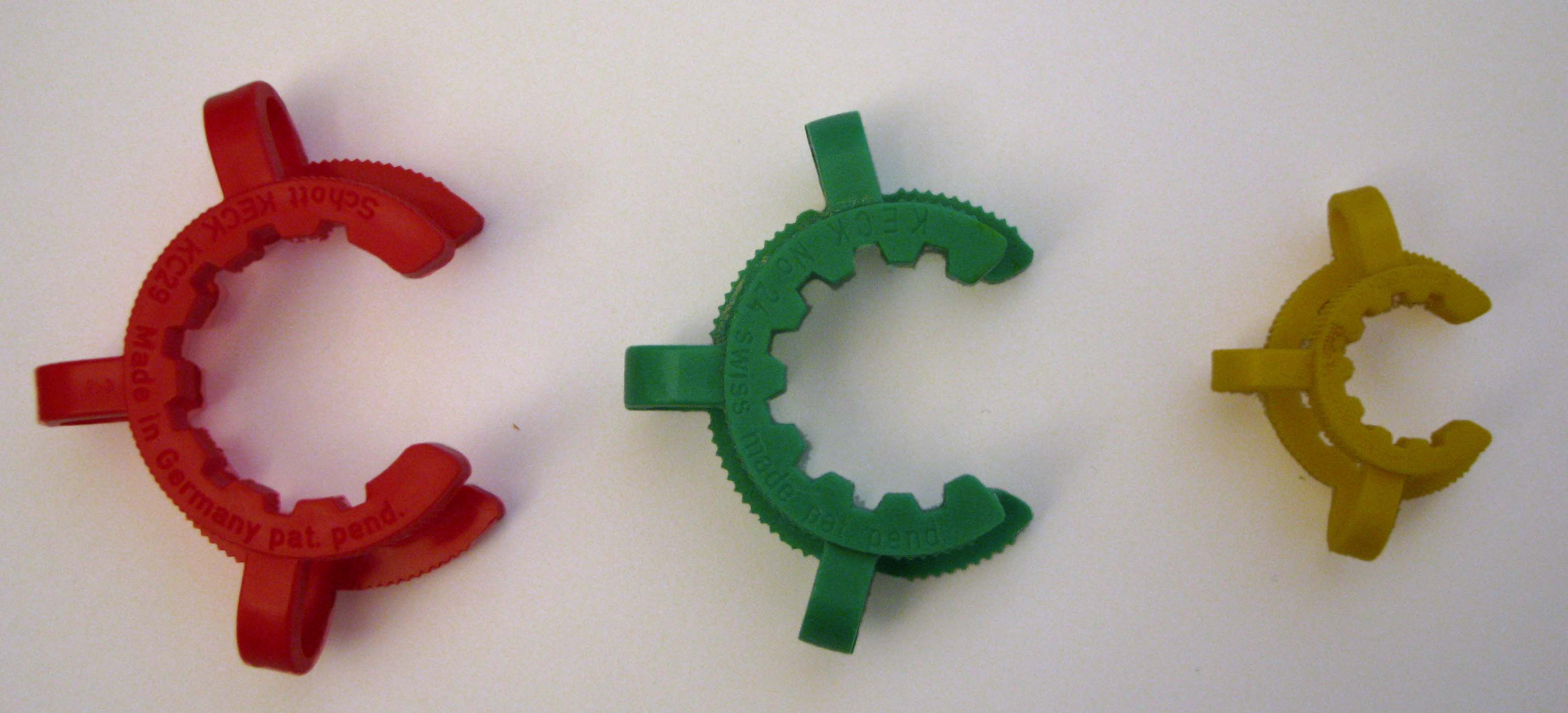
Keck clips made of polyoxymethylene

Polyoxymethylene (POM), also known as acetal, polyacetal, and polyformaldehyde, is an engineering thermoplastic used in precision parts requiring high stiffness, low friction, and excellent dimensional stability. Short-chained POM (chain length between 8 and 100 repeating units) is also better known as paraformaldehyde (PFA). As with many other synthetic polymers, polyoxymethylenes are produced by different chemical firms with slightly different formulas and sold as Delrin, Kocetal, Ultraform, Celcon, Ramtal, Duracon, Kepital, Polypenco, Tenac and Hostaform.

POM is characterized by its high strength, hardness and rigidity to −40 °C (−40 °F). POM is intrinsically opaque white because of its high crystalline composition but can be produced in a variety of colors. POM has a density of 1.410–1.420 g/cm^{3}. POM's electrical resistivity is 14×10^{15} Ω⋅cm making it a dielectric with a 19.5MV/m breakdown voltage.

Typical applications for injection-molded POM include high-performance engineering components such as small gear wheels, eyeglass frames, ball bearings, ski bindings, fasteners, gun parts, knife handles, and lock systems. The material is widely used in the automotive and consumer electronics industry.

== Development ==
Polyoxymethylene was discovered by Hermann Staudinger, a German chemist who received the 1953 Nobel Prize in Chemistry. He had studied the polymerization and structure of POM in the 1920s while researching macromolecules, which he characterized as polymers. Due to problems with thermostability, POM was not commercialized at that time.

Circa 1952, research chemists at DuPont synthesized a version of POM, and in 1956 the company filed for patent protection of the homopolymer, forgetting to mention in the patent the term copolymer, opening thus the road to competitors. DuPont credits R. N. MacDonald as the inventor of high-molecular-weight POM. Patents by MacDonald and coworkers describe the preparation of high-molecular-weight hemiacetal-terminated (~O−CH_{2}OH) POM, but these lack sufficient thermal stability to be commercially viable. The inventor of a heat-stable (and therefore useful) POM homopolymer was Stephen Dal Nogare, who discovered that reacting the hemiacetal ends with acetic anhydride converts the readily depolymerizable hemiacetal into a thermally stable, melt-processable plastic.

In 1960, DuPont completed construction of a plant to produce its own version of acetal resin, named Delrin, at Parkersburg, United States. Also in 1960, Celanese completed its own research. Shortly thereafter, in a limited partnership with the Frankfurt firm Hoechst AG, a factory was built in Kelsterbach, Hessen; from there, Celcon was produced starting in 1962, with Hostaform joining it a year later. Both remain in production under the auspices of Celanese and are sold as parts of a product group now called Hostaform/Celcon POM.

== Production ==
Different manufacturing processes are used to produce the homopolymer and copolymer versions of POM.

=== Homopolymer ===
To make polyoxymethylene homopolymer, anhydrous formaldehyde must be generated. The principal method is by reaction of the aqueous formaldehyde with an alcohol to create a hemiformal, dehydration of the hemiformal/water mixture (either by extraction or vacuum distillation) and release of the formaldehyde by heating the hemiformal. The formaldehyde is then polymerized by anionic catalysis, and the resulting polymer stabilized by reaction with acetic anhydride. Due to the manufacturing process, large-diameter cross-sections may have pronounced centerline porosity. Typical examples of polyoxymethylene homopolymers are Delrin variants.

=== Copolymer ===
The polyoxymethylene copolymer replaces about 1–1.5% of the −CH_{2}O− groups with −CH_{2}CH_{2}O−.

To make polyoxymethylene copolymer, formaldehyde is generally converted to trioxane (specifically 1,3,5-trioxane, also known as trioxin). This is done by acid catalysis (either sulfuric acid or acidic ion-exchange resins) followed by purification of the trioxane by distillation and/or extraction to remove water and other active hydrogen-containing impurities. Typical copolymers are Hostaform from Celanese and Ultraform from BASF.

The co-monomer is typically dioxolane, but ethylene oxide can also be used. Dioxolane is formed by reaction of ethylene glycol with aqueous formaldehyde over an acid catalyst. Other diols can also be used.

Trioxane and dioxolane are polymerized using an acid catalyst, often boron trifluoride etherate, BF_{3}OEt_{2}. The polymerization can take place in a non-polar solvent (in which case the polymer forms as a slurry) or in neat trioxane (e.g. in an extruder). After polymerization, the acidic catalyst must be deactivated and the polymer stabilized by melt or solution hydrolysis to remove unstable end groups.

Stable polymer is melt-compounded, adding thermal and oxidative stabilizers and optionally lubricants and miscellaneous fillers.

=== Fabrication ===
POM is supplied in a granulated form and can be formed into the desired shape by applying heat and pressure. The two most common forming methods employed are injection molding and extrusion. Rotational molding and blow molding are also possible.

Typical applications for injection-molded POM include high-performance engineering components (e.g. gear wheels, ski bindings, yoyos, fasteners, lock systems). The material is widely used in the automotive and consumer electronics industry. There are special grades that offer higher mechanical toughness, stiffness or low-friction/wear properties.

POM is commonly extruded as continuous lengths of round or rectangular section. These sections can be cut to length and sold as bar or sheet stock for machining.

== Typical mechanical properties ==
POM is a hard plastic that cannot be glued, but can be joined to POM by melting. Melted POM does not adhere to steel tools used to shape it.

Density	1.41	kg/dm^{3}
Melting point	175	°C
Specific thermal capacity	1500	J/kg/K
Specific thermal conductivity	0.31 to 0.37	W/m°K
Coefficient of thermal expansion	120	ppm/K

POM is a relatively strong plastic, nearly as strong as epoxy, or aluminum, but a bit more flexible:

Property	value	units
Tensile yield stress	62	MPa
Tensile modulus	2700	MPa
Elongation at yield	2.5	%
Tensile breaking stress	67	MPa
Elongation at break	35	%
Impact strength	80	kJ/m^{2}

POM is wear-resistant:

Property	conditions	value	units
Coefficient of friction against steel	0.3 m/s, 0.49 MPa	0.31	
Coefficient of friction against steel	0.3 m/s, 0.98 MPa	0.37	
Specific wear against steel	0.49 MPa	0.65	mm^{3}/N/km
Specific wear against steel	0.98 MPa	0.30	mm^{3}/N/km
Coefficient of friction against POM	0.15 m/s, 0.06 MPa	0.37	

== Availability and price ==
POM materials can have trademarked producer-specific names, for example "Delrin".

Prices for large quantities, in October 2023, in US$/kg:

- US: 3.26, Europe 2.81, China 2.58, SEA 2.30, Middle East 1.68 .

Prices and availability retail / small wholesale:

- available in many colors, e.g. black, white, but not transparent .
- available as plates [ref], up to 3 meter by 1.25 meter, in thicknesses from 0.5 mm to 130 mm.
- available as round bars [ref], from diameter 5 mm to 200 mm.

Retail price November 2023 in the Netherlands: from 19 to 27 euro/dm^{3}

== Advantages and disadvantages ==
POM is a strong and hard plastic, about as strong as plastics can be, and therefore competes with e.g. epoxy resins and polycarbonates.

The price of POM is about the same as that of epoxy.

There are two main differences between POM and epoxy resins:

- epoxy is a two-component resin that can be cast, and adheres to everything it touches, while POM can be cast when melted and adheres to practically nothing.
- epoxy is usable up to 180 °C, while POM can be used for a long-time up to 80 °C, and for a short-time up to 100 °C.

Epoxy resins need time to cure, while POM has fully matured as soon as it has cooled down.

POM has very little shrinkage: from 165 °C to 20 °C it shrinks by just 0.17%.

== Machining ==
When supplied as extruded bar or sheet, POM may be machined using traditional methods such as turning, milling, drilling etc. These techniques are best employed where production economics do not merit the expense of melt processing. The material is free-cutting, but does require sharp tools with a high clearance angle. The use of soluble cutting lubricant is not necessary, but is recommended.

POM sheets can be cut cleanly and accurately using an infrared laser, such as in a CO_{2} laser cutter.

Because the material lacks the rigidity of most metals, care should be taken to use light clamping forces and sufficient support for the work piece.

As can be the case with many polymers, machined POM can be dimensionally unstable, especially with parts that have large variations in wall thicknesses. It is recommended that such features be "designed-out" e.g. by adding fillets or strengthening ribs. Annealing of pre-machined parts before final finishing is an alternative. A rule of thumb is that in general, small components machined in POM suffer from less warping.

== Bonding ==
POM is typically very difficult to bond, with the copolymer typically responding worse to conventional adhesives than the homopolymer. Special processes and treatments have been developed to improve bonding. Typically these processes involve surface etching, flame treatment, using a specific primer/adhesive system, or mechanical abrasion.

Typical etching processes involve chromic acid at elevated temperatures. DuPont uses a patented process for treating acetal homopolymer called satinizing that creates a surface roughness sufficient for micromechanical interlocking. There are also processes involving oxygen plasma and corona discharge. In order to get a high bond strength without specialized tools, treatments, or roughening, one can use Loctite 401 prism adhesive combined with Loctite 770 prism primer to get bond strengths of ~1700 psi.

Once the surface is prepared, a number of adhesives can be used for bonding. These include epoxies, polyurethanes, and cyanoacrylates. Epoxies have shown 150–1,050 psi (1,000–7,200 kPa) shear strength. Cyanoacrylates are useful for bonding to metal, leather, rubber, cotton, and other plastics.

Solvent welding is typically unsuccessful on acetal polymers, due to the excellent solvent resistance of acetal.

Thermal welding through various methods has been used successfully. Warping can occur if the material is cooled too quickly after welding.

== Usage ==
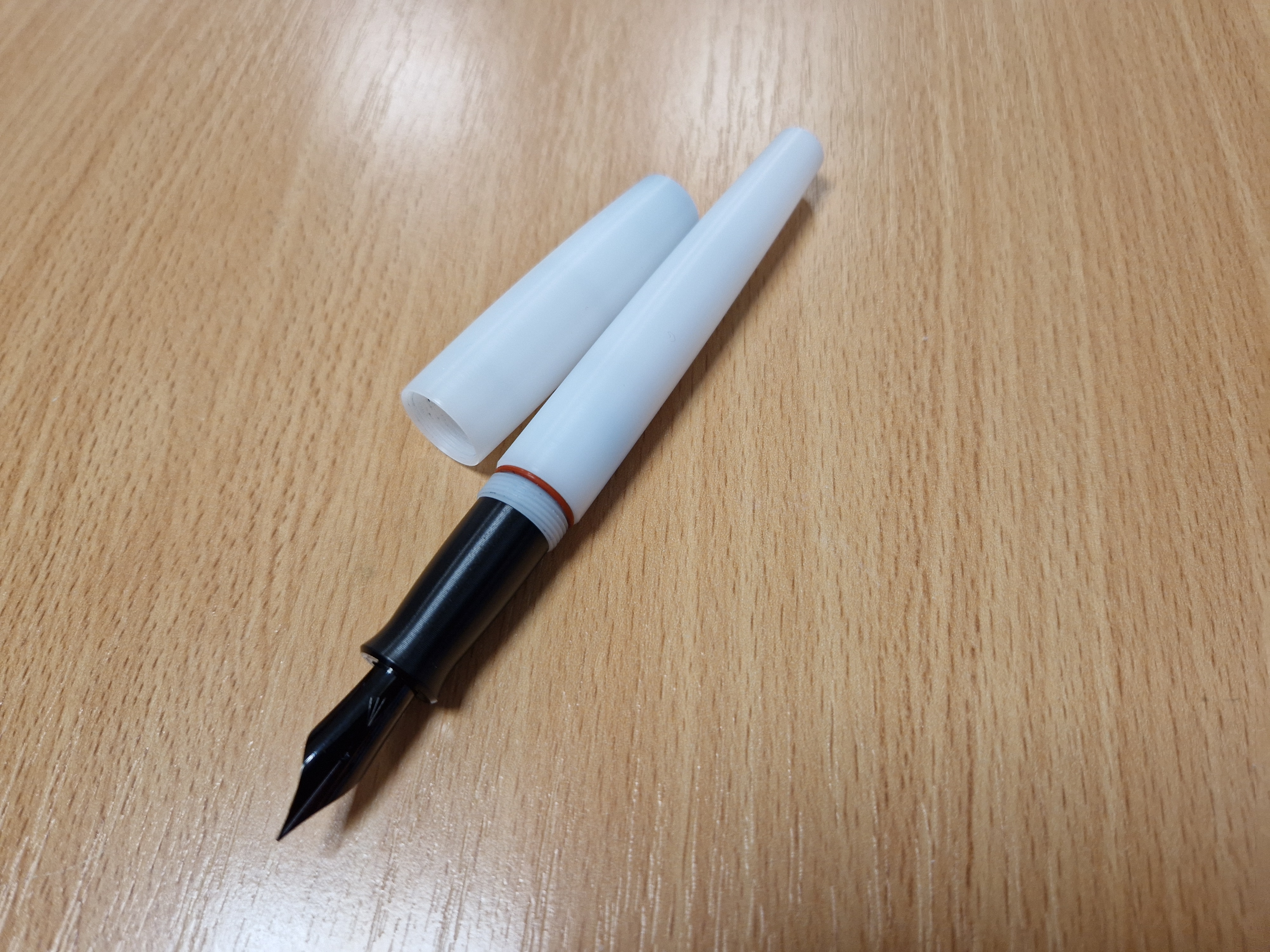
- A fountain pen with a polyoxymethylene body and cap
  Mechanical gears, sliding and guiding elements, housing parts, springs, chains, screws, nuts, pop rivets, fan wheels, pump parts, valve bodies.
- Electrical engineering: insulators, bobbins, connectors, parts for electronic devices such as televisions, telephones, etc.
- Vehicle: fuel sender unit, light/control stalk/combination switch (including shifter for light, turn signal), power windows, door lock systems, articulated shells.
- Model: model railway parts, such as trucks (bogies) and hand rails (handle bars). POM is tougher than ABS, comes in bright translucent colors, and is not paintable.
- Hobbies: radio-controlled helicopter main gear, landing skid, yo-yos, vaping drip tips, 3D printer wheels, K'Nex, ball-jointed dolls, etc.
- Medical: insulin pen, metered dose inhalers (MDI).
- Food industry: Food and Drug Administration has approved some grades of POM for milk pumps, coffee spigots, filter housings and food conveyors.
- Furniture: hardware, locks, handles, hinges., rollers for sliding mechanisms of furniture
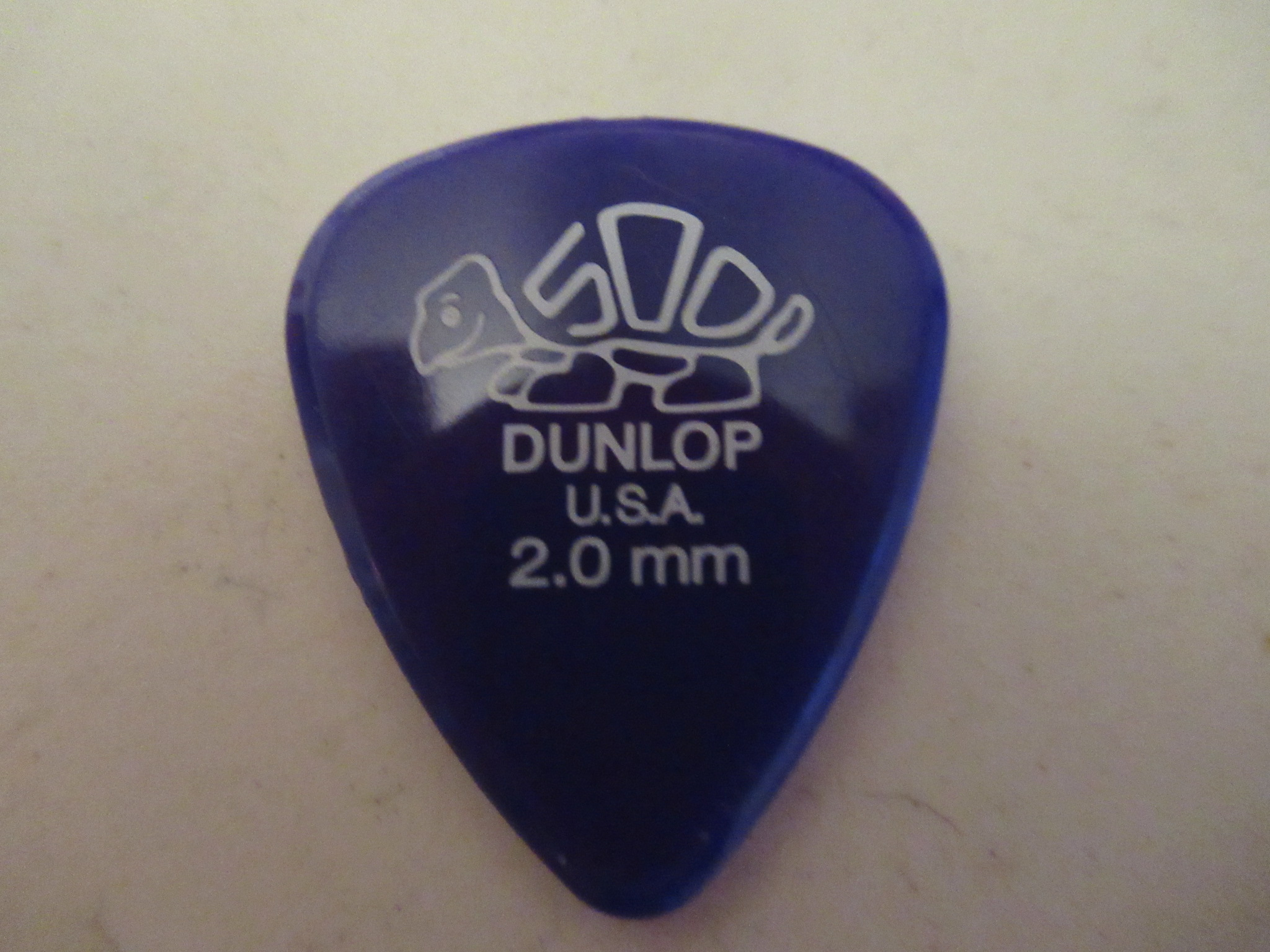
- Dunlop "Delrin 500" guitar pick
  Construction: structural glass - pod holder for point
- Packaging: aerosol cans, vehicle tanks.
- Pens: used as the material for pen bodies and caps
- Sports: paintball accessories. It is often used for machined parts of paintball markers that do not require the strength of aluminum, such as handles and reciprocating bolts. POM is also used in airsoft guns to reduce piston noise.
- Longboarding: puck material for slide gloves help the rider touch the road and lean on their hand to slow down, stop, or perform tricks.
- Clothing: zippers.
- Music: picks, Irish flutes, bagpipes, practice chanters, harpsichord plectra, instrument mouthpieces, tips of some drum sticks.
- Dining: fully automatic coffee brewers; knife handles (particularly folding knives).
- Horology: mechanical movement parts (e.g. Lemania 5100), watch bracelets (e.g. IWC Porsche Design 3701).
- Vapor/e-cigarette accessories: material used in the manufacturing of most "Drip Tips" (Mouthpiece).
- Lighters: The BIC Group uses Delrin for their lighters.
- Keyboard keycaps: The company Cherry uses POM for their G80 and G81 series keyboards.

== Degradation ==
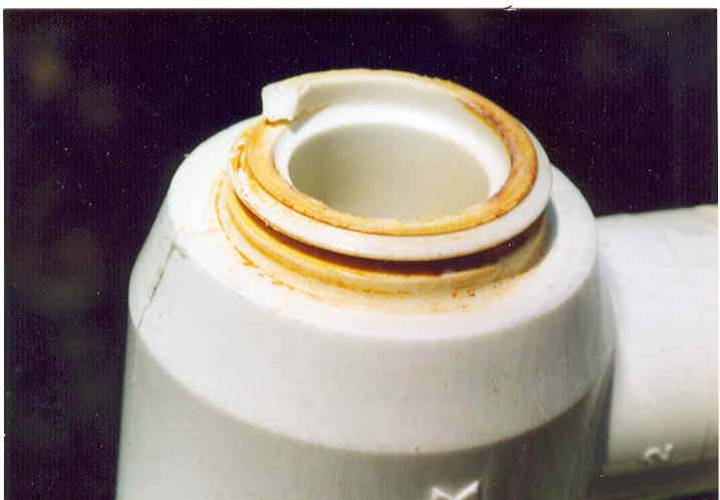
Chlorine attack of acetal-resin plumbing joint

Acetal resins are sensitive to acid hydrolysis and oxidation by agents such as mineral acid and chlorine. POM homopolymer is also susceptible to alkaline attack and is more susceptible to degradation in hot water. Thus low levels of chlorine in potable water supplies (1–3 ppm) can be sufficient to cause environmental stress cracking, a problem experienced in both the US and Europe in domestic and commercial water supply systems. Defective moldings are most sensitive to cracking, but normal moldings can succumb if the water is hot. Both POM homopolymer and copolymer are stabilized to mitigate these types of degradation.

In chemistry applications, although the polymer is often suitable for the majority of glassware work, it can succumb to catastrophic failure. An example of this would be using the polymer clips on hot areas of the glassware (such as a flask-to-column, column-to-head or head-to-condenser joint during distillation). As the polymer is sensitive to both chlorine and acid hydrolysis, it may perform very poorly when exposed to the reactive gases, particularly hydrogen chloride (HCl). Failures in this latter instance can occur with seemingly unimportant exposures from well sealed joints and do so without warning and rapidly (the component will split or fall apart). This can be a significant health hazard, as the glass may open or smash. Here, PTFE or a corrosion-resistant stainless steel may be a more appropriate choice.

In addition, POM can have undesirable characteristics when burned. The flame is not self-extinguishing, shows little to no smoke, and the blue flame can be almost invisible in ambient light. Burning also releases formaldehyde gas, which irritates nose, throat, and eye tissues.

== See also ==
- Dalziel Hammick
- Forensic engineering
- Forensic polymer engineering
- Paraformaldehyde
- Polymer degradation
- Resin
