= El Angel Ecological Reserve =

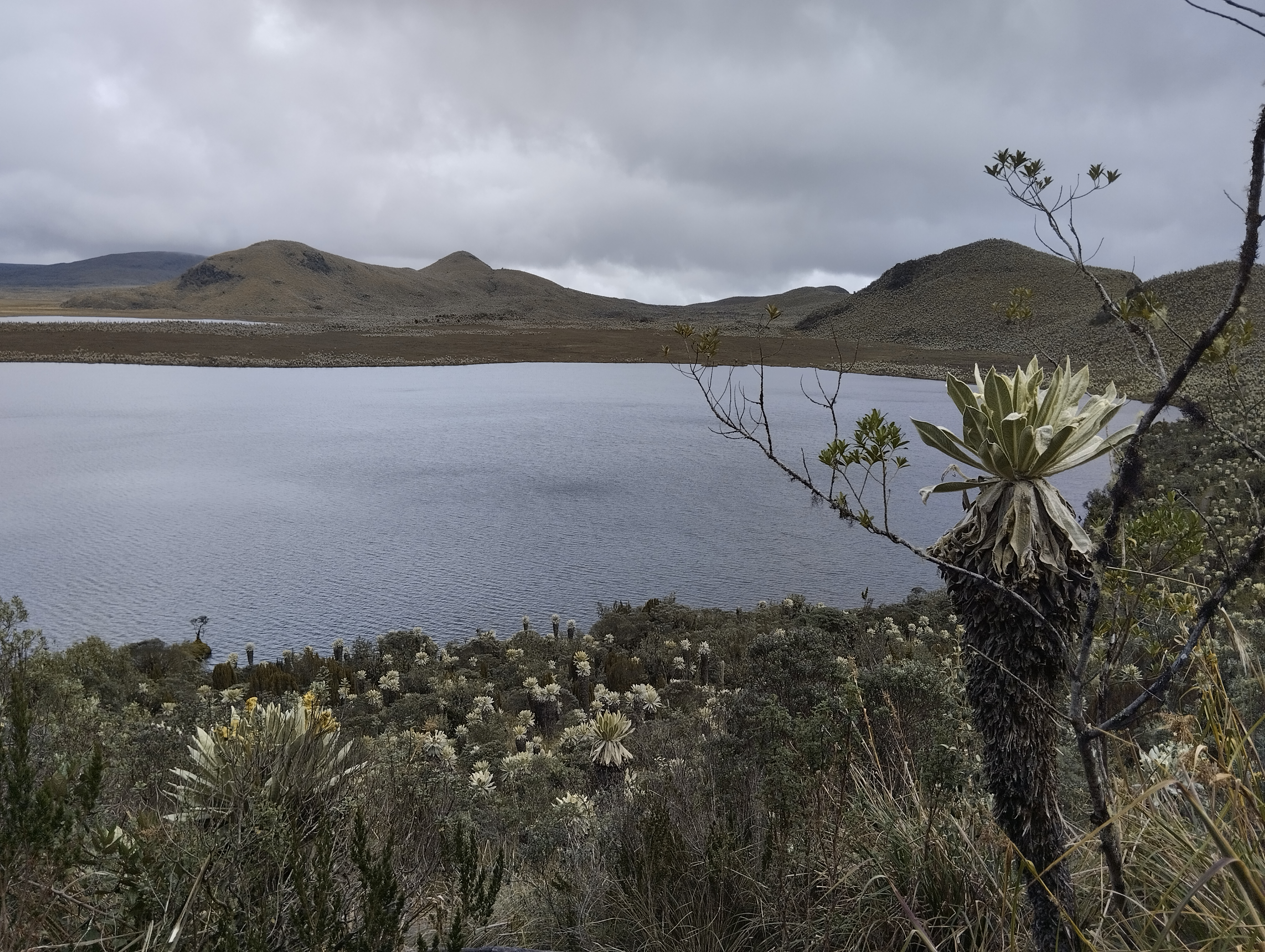
El Voladero lagoon and plants in El Angel Ecological Reserve

El Angel Ecological Reserve is a 16,000 hectare national park in El Ángel, Ecuador, founded in 1992, consisting primarily of páramo (high altitude grassland).

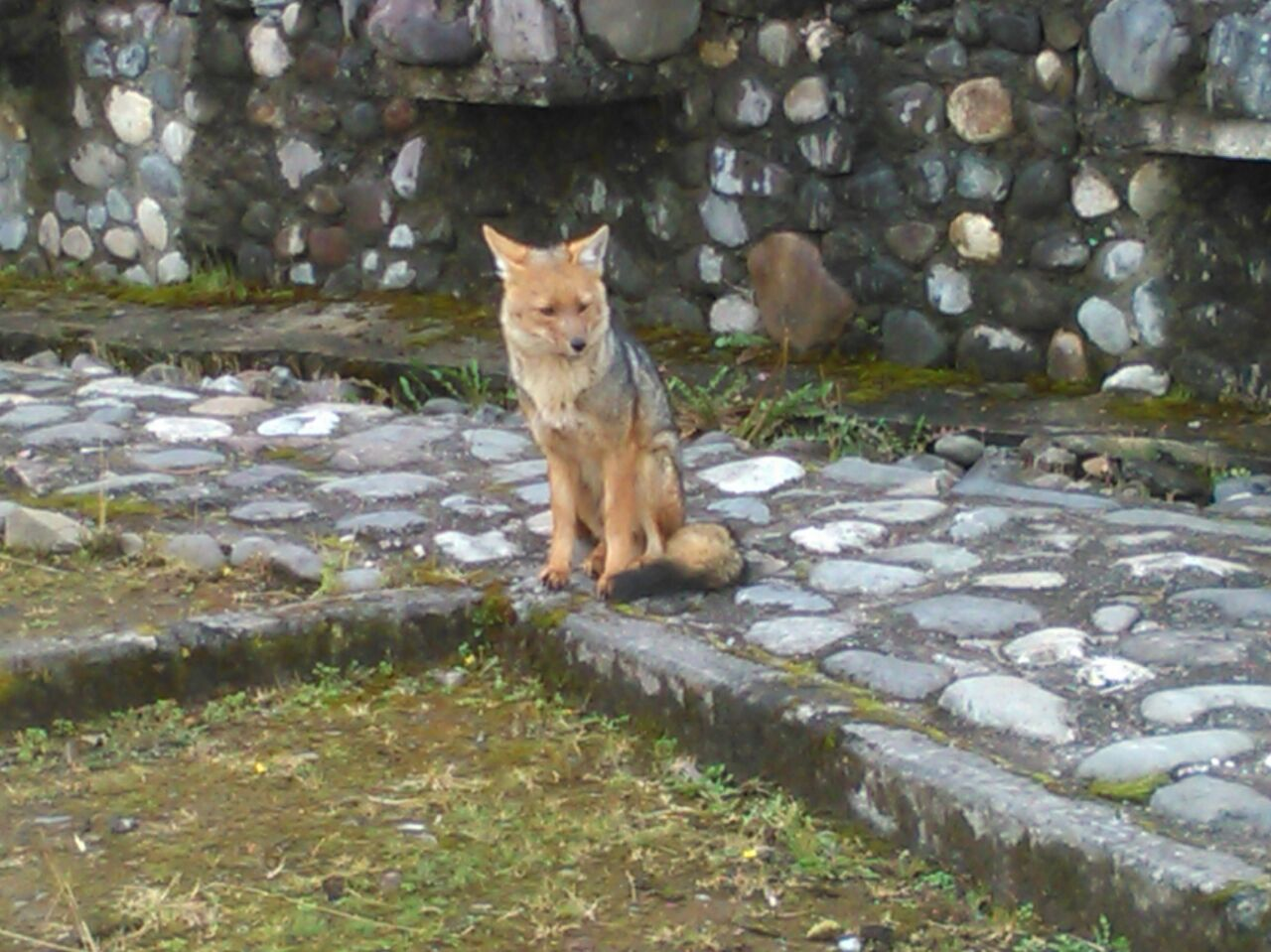
Fox (El Angel Ecological Reserve)

== See also ==
- 1992 in the environment
- Environment of Ecuador
- Human impact on the environment
- List of environmental issues
- List of years in the environment
