= El Ángel, Ecuador =

El Ángel
- Town
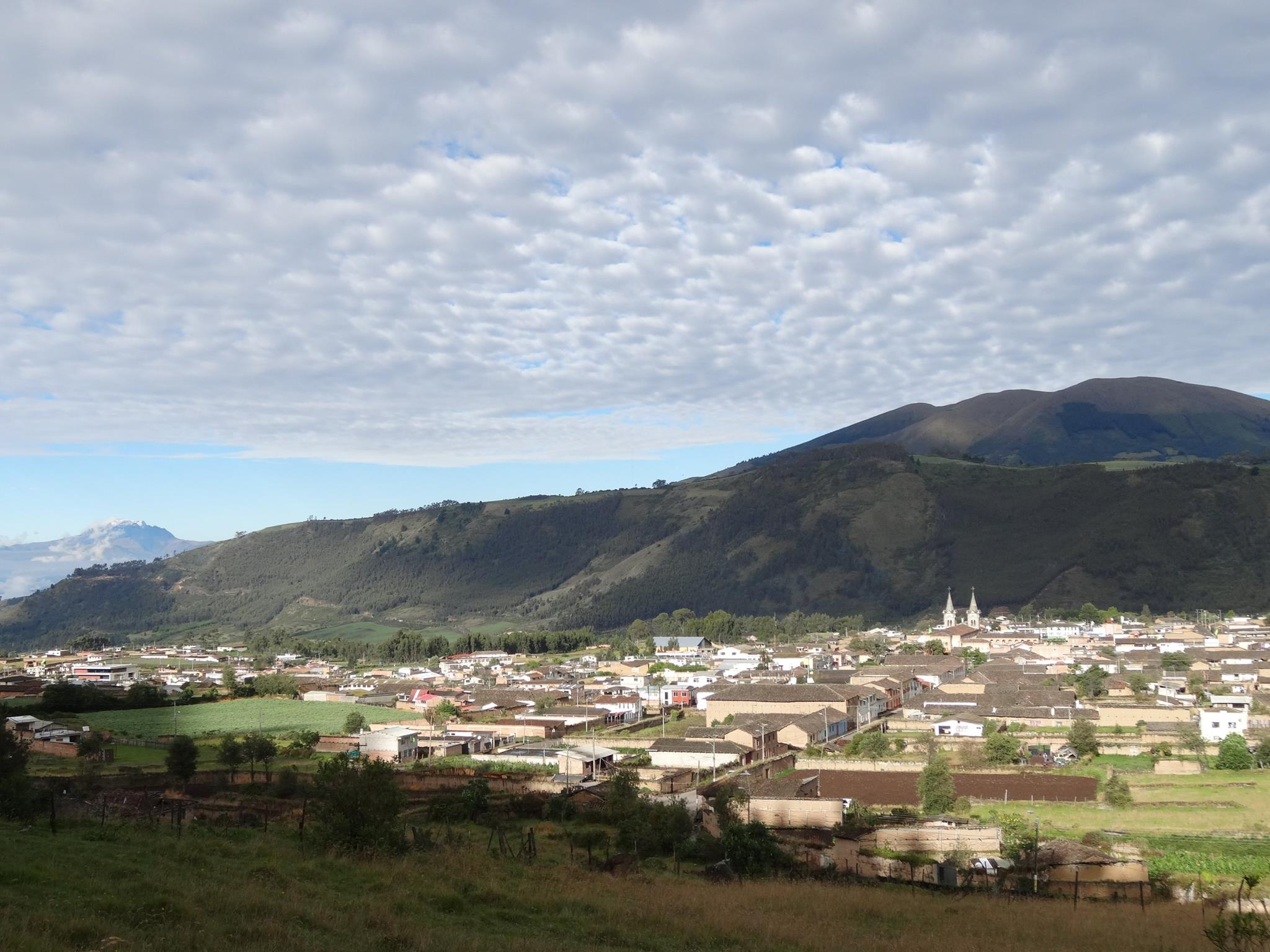
- Panoramic view of El Ángel

- Location within Ecuador
- Coordinates: 0°37′15″N 77°56′23″W
- Country: Ecuador
- Province: Carchi
- Canton: Espejo Canton

Area
  - Town: 2.69 km^{2} (1.04 sq mi)
- Elevation: 3,007 m (9,865 ft)

Population (2022 census)
  - Town: 5,181
  - Density: 1,930/km^{2} (4,990/sq mi)
- Time zone: UTC-5
- Area code: (+593) 6
- Climate: Csb

El Ángel is a town located in the northern Andes of Ecuador, capital of the Espejo canton in the Carchi province.

== Basic Information ==
- Population: 4,497 Hab (2010).
- Altitude: 3007 m.
- Average temperature: 12 °C.
- Climate: Cold Highland.
- Canton festivities: September 27.

== History ==
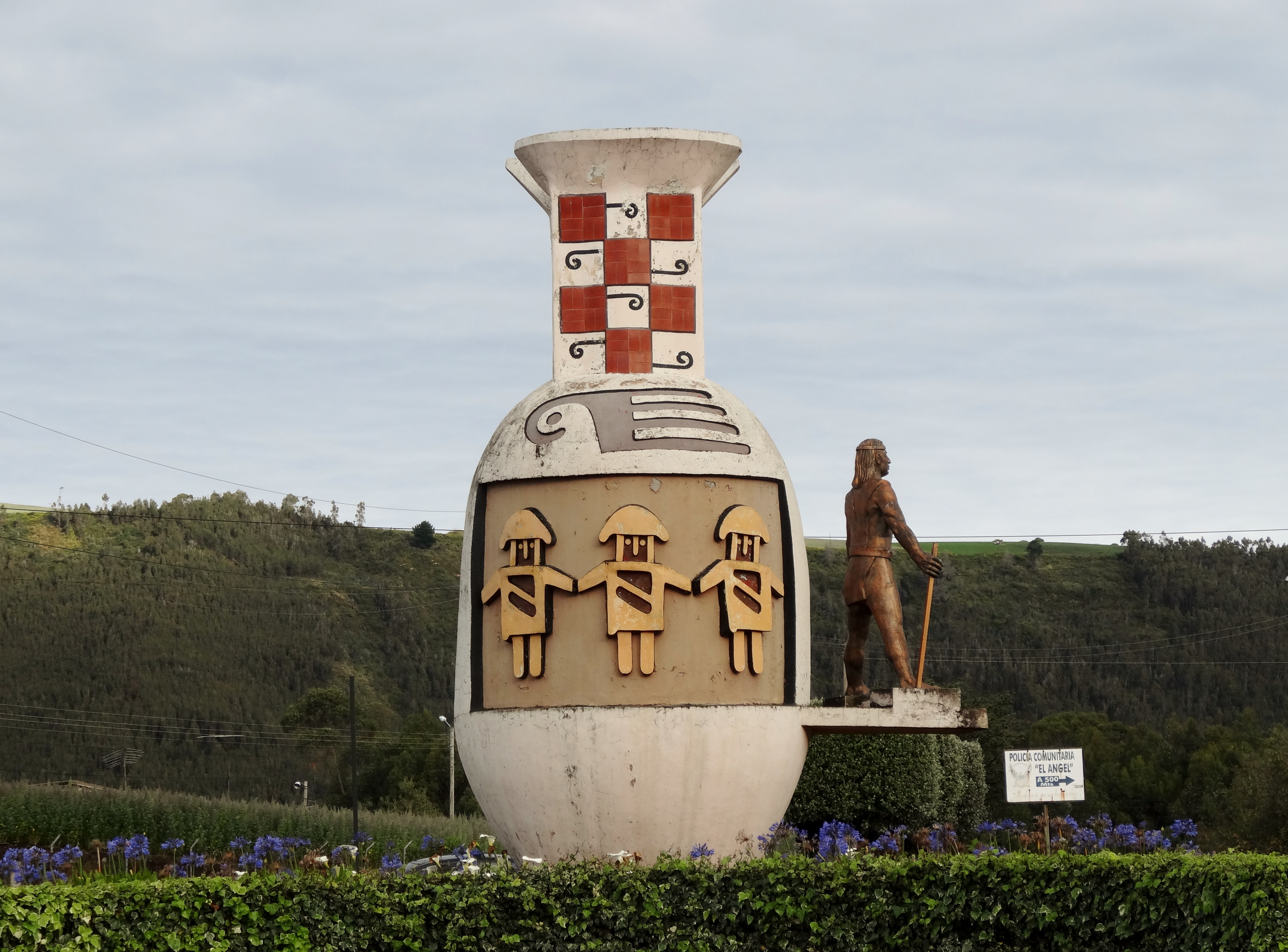
Monument La Botijuela

Prehispanic settlements were confirmed due to the ceramic remains found in the sector of Las Tres Tolas. In 1851, El Angel became a parish of the Tulcan canton . From the twentieth century, new road infrastructure from El Ángel towards Tulcán and Ibarra cities, promoted the development of the town and the canton. The September 27, 1934 the Espejo canton was created, being its capital El Angel.

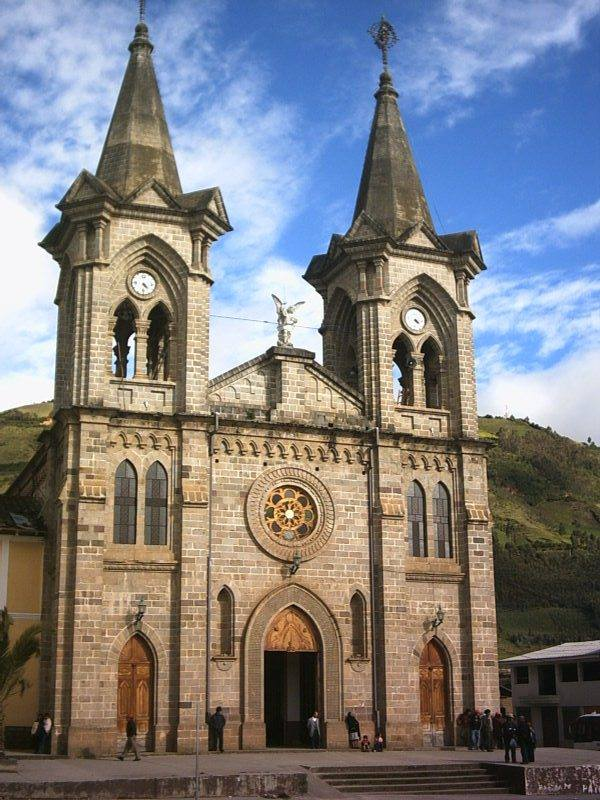
Church of El Angel

== Economy ==
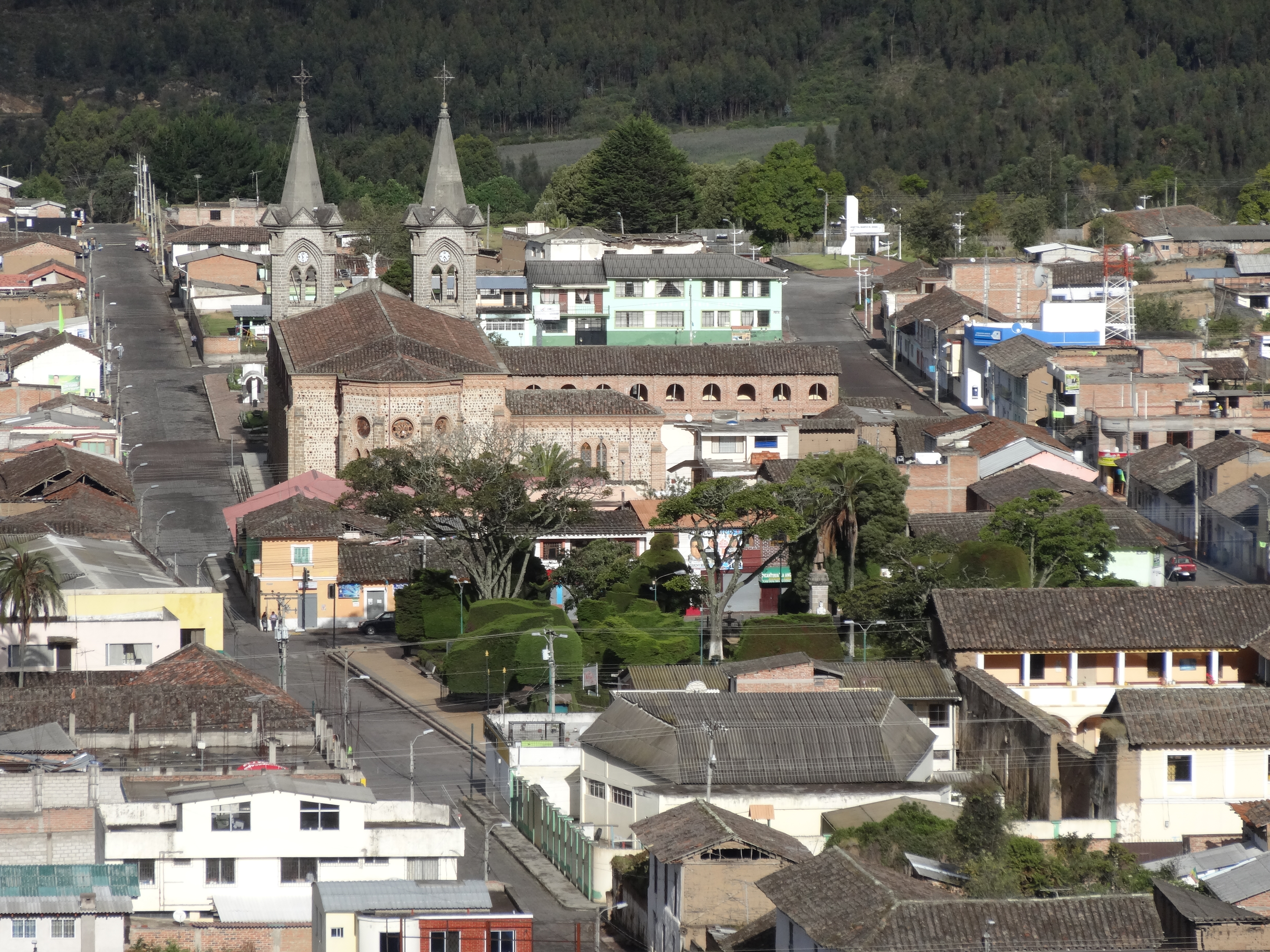
El Angel centre

The main economic activities of the population are public, private services and trade, that are performed inside and outside the city; and secondary activities as agriculture, floriculture and livestock production.

== Tourist Attractions ==
- Bellavista Mirador.
- Church of El Angel.
- Monuments La Botiluela and Nuevo Milenio.
- Thermal spas La Calera.
- Archaeological Museum.
- El Angel Ecological Reserve.

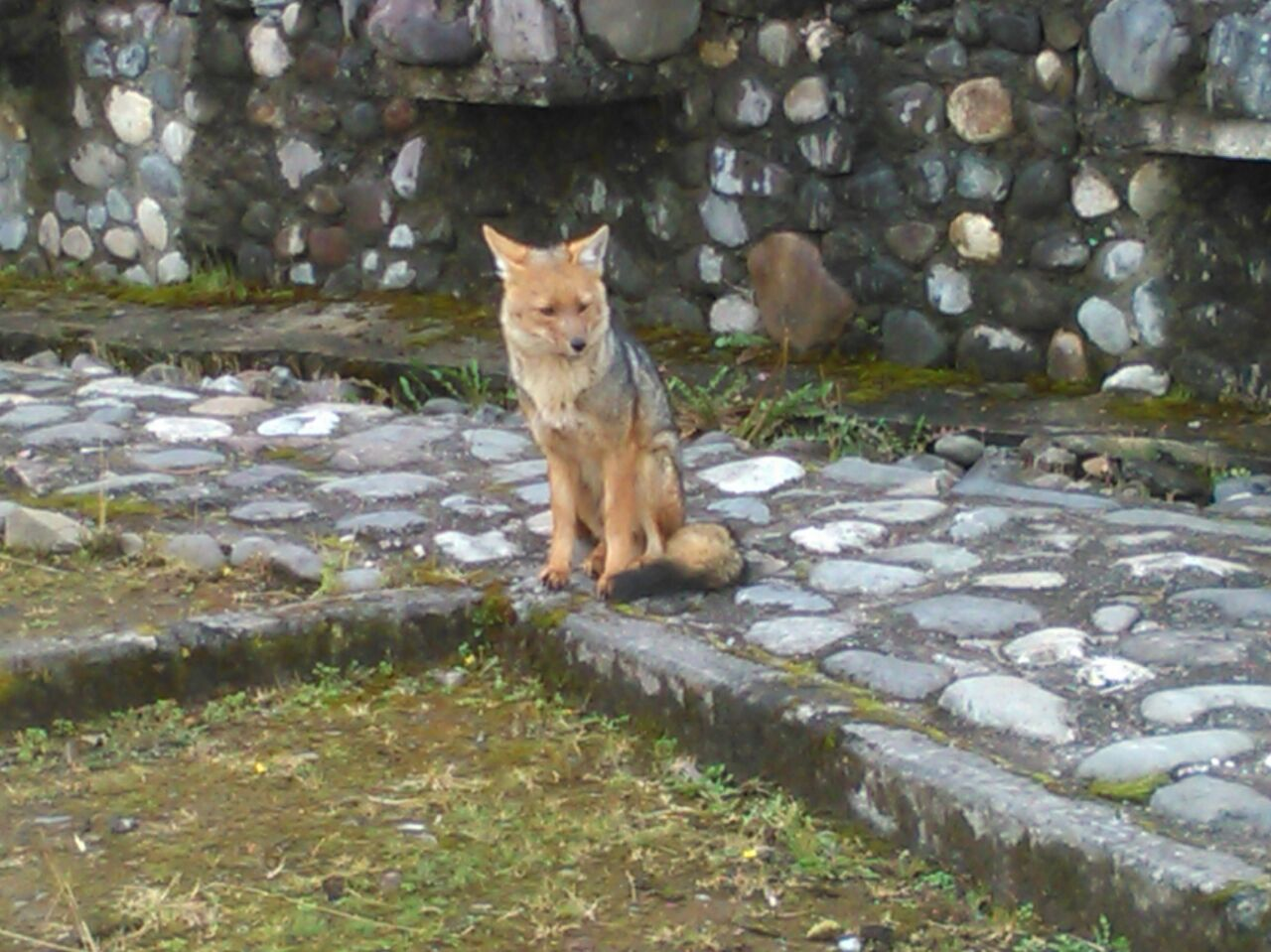
Fox (El Angel Ecological Reserve)

== Access Routes ==
From the Pan-American Highway

- Road: Bolívar – El Ángel.
- Road: Mascarilla – Mira – El Ángel.

== Climate ==
Climate data for El Ángel, elevation 3,055 m (10,023 ft), (1971–2000)
Month	Jan	Feb	Mar	Apr	May	Jun	Jul	Aug	Sep	Oct	Nov	Dec	Year
Mean daily maximum °C (°F)	16.3 (61.3)	16.1 (61.0)	16.2 (61.2)	16.5 (61.7)	16.6 (61.9)	15.7 (60.3)	15.2 (59.4)	15.4 (59.7)	16.5 (61.7)	16.6 (61.9)	16.6 (61.9)	16.1 (61.0)	16.2 (61.1)
Mean daily minimum °C (°F)	7.1 (44.8)	7.1 (44.8)	7.5 (45.5)	7.8 (46.0)	7.6 (45.7)	6.9 (44.4)	6.8 (44.2)	6.7 (44.1)	7.9 (46.2)	7.3 (45.1)	7.0 (44.6)	7.4 (45.3)	7.3 (45.1)
Average precipitation mm (inches)	86.0 (3.39)	118.0 (4.65)	106.0 (4.17)	120.0 (4.72)	56.0 (2.20)	46.0 (1.81)	41.0 (1.61)	33.0 (1.30)	42.0 (1.65)	105.0 (4.13)	138.0 (5.43)	118.0 (4.65)	1,009 (39.71)
Average relative humidity (%)	77	77	76	75	75	77	75	75	74	76	77	78	76
Source: FAO
