= Espejo Canton =

- Canton
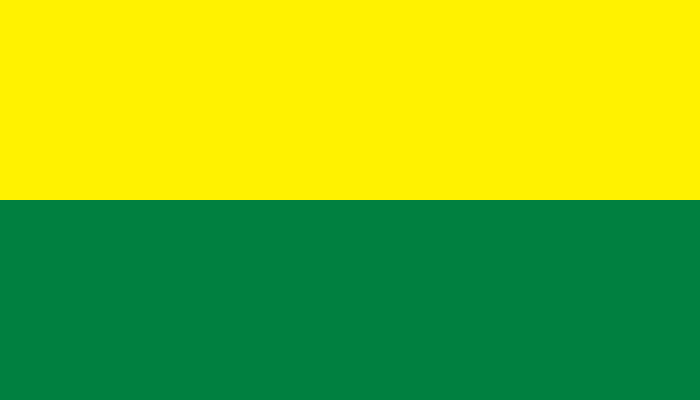
- Flag

- Location of Carchi Province in Ecuador.

- Espejo Canton in Carchi Province
- Coordinates: 0.621°N 77.940°W
- Country: Ecuador
- Province: Carchi

Area
  - Total: 566.5 km^{2} (218.7 sq mi)

Population (2022 census)
  - Total: 14,522
  - Density: 25.63/km^{2} (66.39/sq mi)
- Time zone: UTC-5 (ECT)

Espejo is a canton of Ecuador, located in Carchi Province. Its capital is the town of El Ángel. Its population in the 2001 census was 13,515 and in the 2010 census was 13,364. Espejo is located in the Andes and El Ángel is situated at an elevation of 3,010 metres (9,880 ft) above sea level.

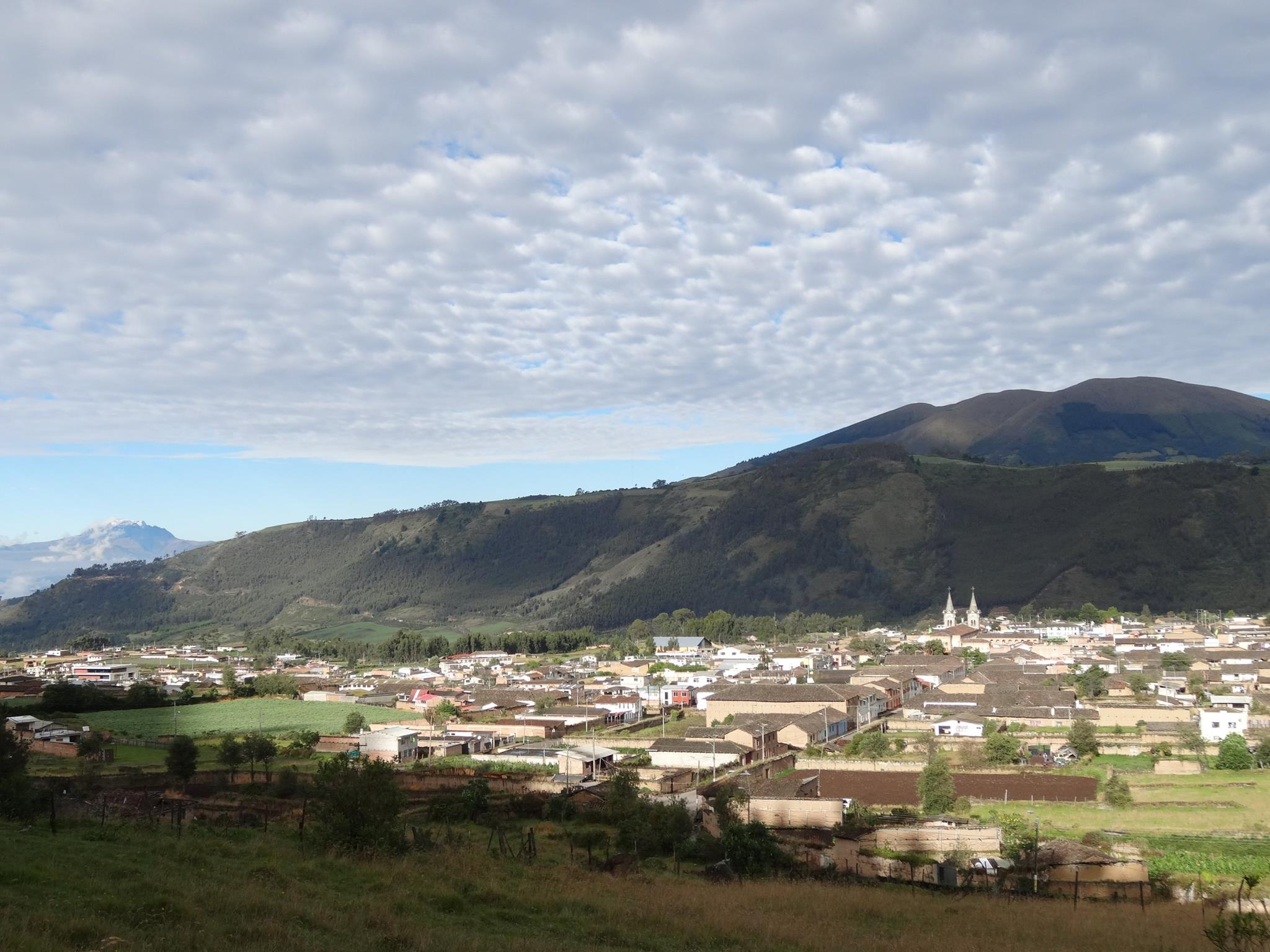
The canton capital of El Ángel.

Espejo canton contains the parishes of El Ángel (Anhil), El Goaltal, La Libertad (Alizo), and San Isidro.

== Demographics ==
Ethnic groups as of the Ecuadorian census of 2010:

- Mestizo 95.1%
- White 2.1%
- Afro-Ecuadorian 1.4%
- Indigenous 1.0%
- Montubio 0.4%
- Other 0.0%
