= Paraformaldehyde =

Names
- IUPAC name Polyoxymethylene

Identifiers
CAS Number	30525-89-4
ChemSpider	none
ECHA InfoCard	100.108.270
EC Number	608-494-5
UNII	Y19UC83H8E
UN number	2213
CompTox Dashboard (EPA)	DTXSID8034798

Properties
Chemical formula	OH(CH_{2}O)_{n}H (n = 8 - 100)
Appearance	White powder with formaldehyde-like odour
Density	1.46 g/cm^{3}
Melting point	120 °C (248 °F; 393 K)
Solubility in water	slightly soluble
Vapor pressure	1.579 kPa

Hazards
- GHS labelling
Pictograms	(GHS02: Flammable) (GHS08: Health hazard)
Signal word	Danger
Hazard statements	H228, H302, H315, H317, H318, H332, H334, H351
NFPA 704 (fire diamond)	3 2 1
Flash point	71 °C (160 °F; 344 K)
Autoignition temperature	300 °C (572 °F; 573 K)
Explosive limits	7.0% (low), 73% (high)
- Lethal dose or concentration (LD, LC)
LD_{50} (median dose)	800 mg/kg (rat, oral)
LC_{50} (median concentration)	1070 mg/m^{3} (rat, 4h)
Safety data sheet (SDS)	Fisher Scientific
- Except where otherwise noted, data are given for materials in their standard state (at 25 °C [77 °F], 100 kPa). verify (what is ?) Infobox references

Paraformaldehyde (PFA) is the smallest polyoxymethylene, the polymerization product of formaldehyde with a typical degree of polymerization of 8–100 units. Paraformaldehyde commonly has a slight odor of formaldehyde due to decomposition. Paraformaldehyde is a poly-acetal.

== Synthesis ==
Paraformaldehyde forms slowly in aqueous formaldehyde solutions as a white precipitate, especially if stored in the cold. Formalin actually contains very little monomeric formaldehyde; most of it forms short chains of polyformaldehyde. A small amount of methanol is often added as a stabilizer to limit the extent of polymerization.

== Reactions ==
Paraformaldehyde can be depolymerized to formaldehyde gas by dry heating and to formaldehyde solution by water in the presence of a base, an acid or heat. The high purity formaldehyde solutions obtained in this way are used as a fixative for microscopy and histology.

The resulting formaldehyde gas from dry heating paraformaldehyde is flammable.

== Uses ==
Once paraformaldehyde is depolymerized, the resulting formaldehyde may be used as a fumigant, disinfectant, fungicide, and fixative. Longer chain-length (high molecular weight) polyoxymethylenes are used as a thermoplastic and are known as polyoxymethylene plastic (POM, Delrin). It was used in the past in the discredited Sargenti method of root canal treatment.

Paraformaldehyde is not a fixative; it must be depolymerized to formaldehyde in solution. In cell culture, a typical formaldehyde fixing procedure would involve using a 4% formaldehyde solution in phosphate buffered saline (PBS) on ice for 10 minutes. In histology and pathology specimens preparation, usually, the fixation step is performed using 10% Neutral Buffered Formalin (4% formaldehyde) for, at least, 24 hours.

Paraformaldehyde is also used to crosslink proteins to DNA, as used in ChIP (chromatin immunoprecipitation) which is a technique to determine which part of DNA certain proteins are binding to.

Paraformaldehyde can be used as a substitute of aqueous formaldehyde to produce the resinous binding material, which is commonly used together with melamine, phenol or other reactive agents in the manufacturing of particle board, medium density fiberboard and plywood.

== Toxicity ==
As a formaldehyde releasing agent, paraformaldehyde is a potential carcinogen. Its acute oral median lethal dose in rats is 592 mg/kg.

== See also ==
- 1,3,5-Trioxane (metaformaldehyde), the cyclic trimer of formaldehyde
