= NOx Law (Japan) =

Japanese automobile emissions law

Amendment Act on Reduction of Total Amount of Nitrogen Dioxide and Particulate Matters Originating from Automobiles in Designated Areas (introduced on 3 June 1992, amended on 19 June 2001) is a piece of environmental legislation in Japan.

== Background ==
The Act sets the maximum emissions of nitrogen dioxide (NO_{x}) and particulate matters (PMs) allowed by trucks, buses, and diesel passenger vehicles. Complying with this standard has become a requirement to pass the Motor-vehicle inspection (Japan) which is necessary to register cars.

The Act is based on the 1992 law that was aimed at the reduction of nitrogen dioxide emissions from diesel vehicles.

Further research revealed that particulate matters pose serious cancer risk to the human body. The Act was amended in 2001 to include PMs and enlarged the geographical areas under the regulation.

== Affected area ==
- Kantō: most municipalities in Saitama, Chiba, Tokyo, and Kanagawa
- Kansai: majority of municipalities in Osaka and Hyogo
- Chukyo: majority of municipalities in Aichi and Mie

== Criticism ==
Critics argued the law cannot stop dirty cars from coming into the regulated areas, as they would simply register the cars at municipalities that are not covered under the law. To patch this loophole, prefectural governments have set up bylaws (local ordinance) that prohibit non-complying cars to use the roads in their jurisdictions.

== Regulated by ==
- Ministry of the Environment
- Ministry of Land, Infrastructure and Transport

== See also ==
- 1992 in the environment
- Energy law
