= 1,3,5-Trioxanetrione =

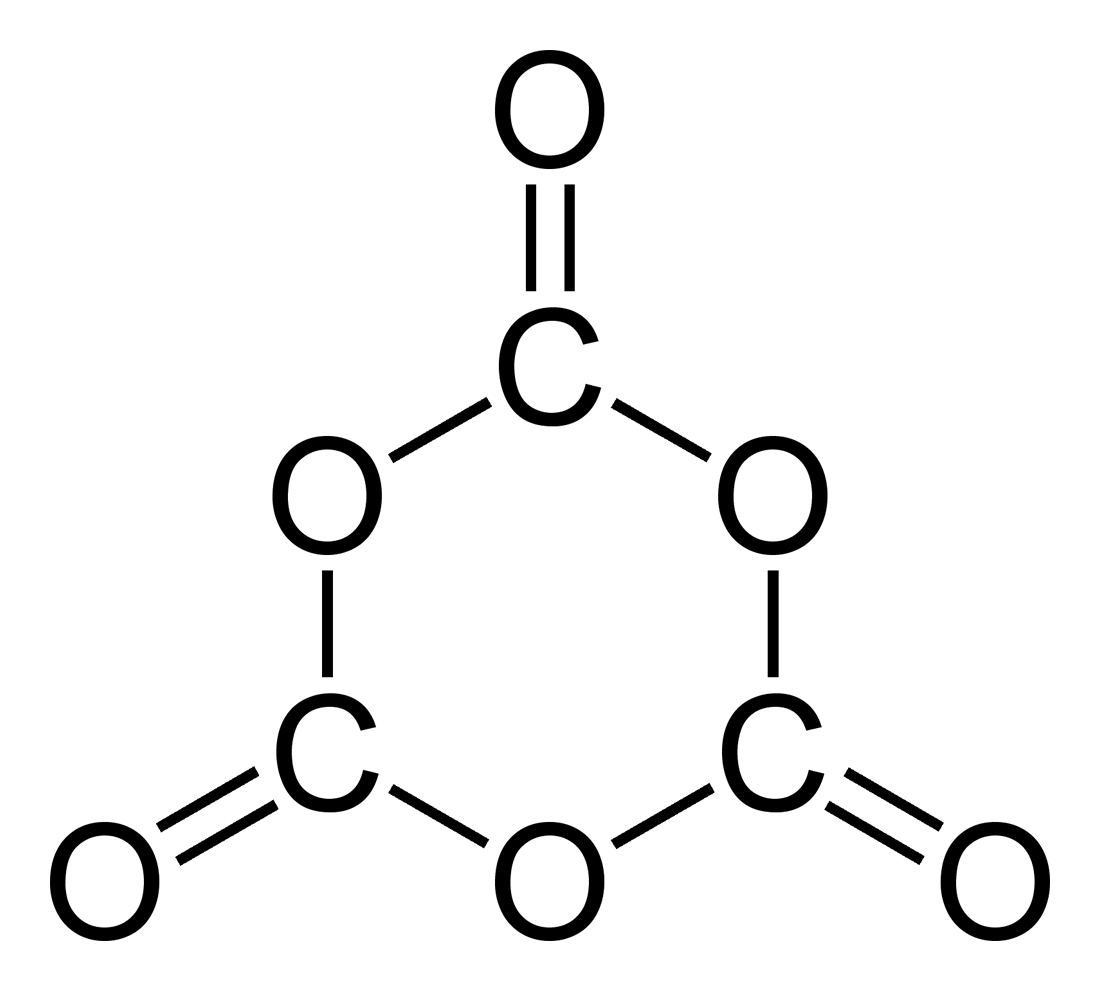

Names
- Preferred IUPAC name 1,3,5-Trioxanetrione

Identifiers
CAS Number	130242-72-7
3D model (JSmol)	Interactive image
ChemSpider	74799190
PubChem CID	14794697
UNII	EF73HE7RVR
CompTox Dashboard (EPA)	DTXSID201336175
- InChI: InChI=1S/C3O6/c4-1-7-2(5)9-3(6)8-1 Key: FFPDLONZSMFWAT-UHFFFAOYSA-N
- SMILES: O=C1OC(=O)OC(=O)O1

Properties
Chemical formula	C_{3}O_{6}
Molar mass	132.027 g·mol^{−1}
- Except where otherwise noted, data are given for materials in their standard state (at 25 °C [77 °F], 100 kPa). verify (what is ?) Infobox references

The chemical compound 1,3,5-trioxanetrione, or 1,3,5-trioxacyclohexane-2,4,6-trione is an unstable oxide of carbon with formula C_{3}O_{6}. It can be considered a cyclic trimer of carbon dioxide (CO_{2}) or as a triple ketone of 1,3,5-trioxane (1,3,5-trioxacyclohexane). Trioxanetrione has been synthesized but is exceedingly unstable, with a half-life of approximately 40 min at −40 °C. It decomposes to give carbon dioxide.
