= Oslo Dumping Convention =

International agreement on ocean pollution

The Convention for the Prevention of Marine Pollution by Dumping from Ships and Aircraft also called the Oslo Convention was an international agreement designed to control the dumping of harmful substances from ships and aircraft into the sea. It was adopted on 15 February 1972 in Oslo, Norway and came into force on 7 April 1974. Original signatories were Denmark, France, Iceland, Norway, Portugal, Spain, and Sweden. Later members included the United Kingdom (1975), the Netherlands (1975), Germany (1977), Finland (1979), Ireland (1982), and Belgium (1985).

The area covered by the treaty included the Atlantic and Arctic Oceans north of latitude 36°N, east of longitude 42°W and west of longitude 51°E, excluding the Baltic and Mediterranean Seas

The Convention prohibited the dumping of halocarbons and organosilicon (with some exceptions), mercury and mercury compounds, cadmium and cadmium compounds, non-biodegradable plastics and other persistent materials, as well as "substances which have been agreed between the Contracting Parties as likely to be carcinogenic under the conditions of disposal." It also restricted and required a permit for the dumping of arsenic, lead, copper, zinc and their compounds, as well as cyanides, and fluorides, pesticides, containers, "tar-like substances", scrap metal, and "other bulky wastes."

It also defined the considerations to be made in the issuance of dumping permits by each signatory state and required them to enforce the agreement within their territorial sea and make efforts to prevent dumping of materials outside the agreement's defined borders.

The convention was amended once, in December 1981, which amendment came into force in February 1982. The Oslo Convention was replaced by the Convention for the Protection of the Marine Environment of the North-East Atlantic or "OSPAR Convention" when it came into force on 25 March 1998.
