= Carbonic anhydride =

Carbonic anhydride may refer to:

- Carbon dioxide, the acidic oxide of carbonic acid
- Dicarbonic acid, the monoanhydride of carbonic acid using two molecules
- 1,3-Dioxetanedione, the dianhydride of carbonic acid using two molecules
- 1,3,5-Trioxanetrione, the dianhydride of carbonic acid using three molecules
