= 1,2,4-Trioxane =

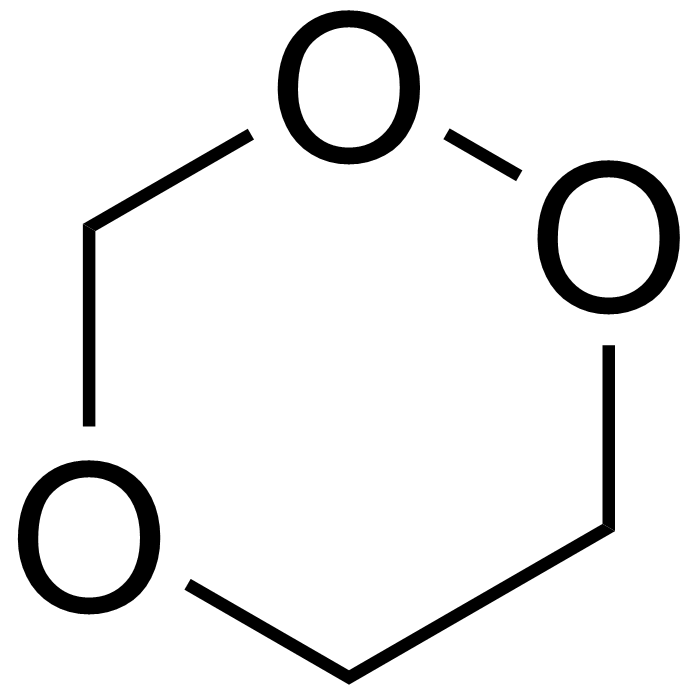
1,2,4-Trioxane
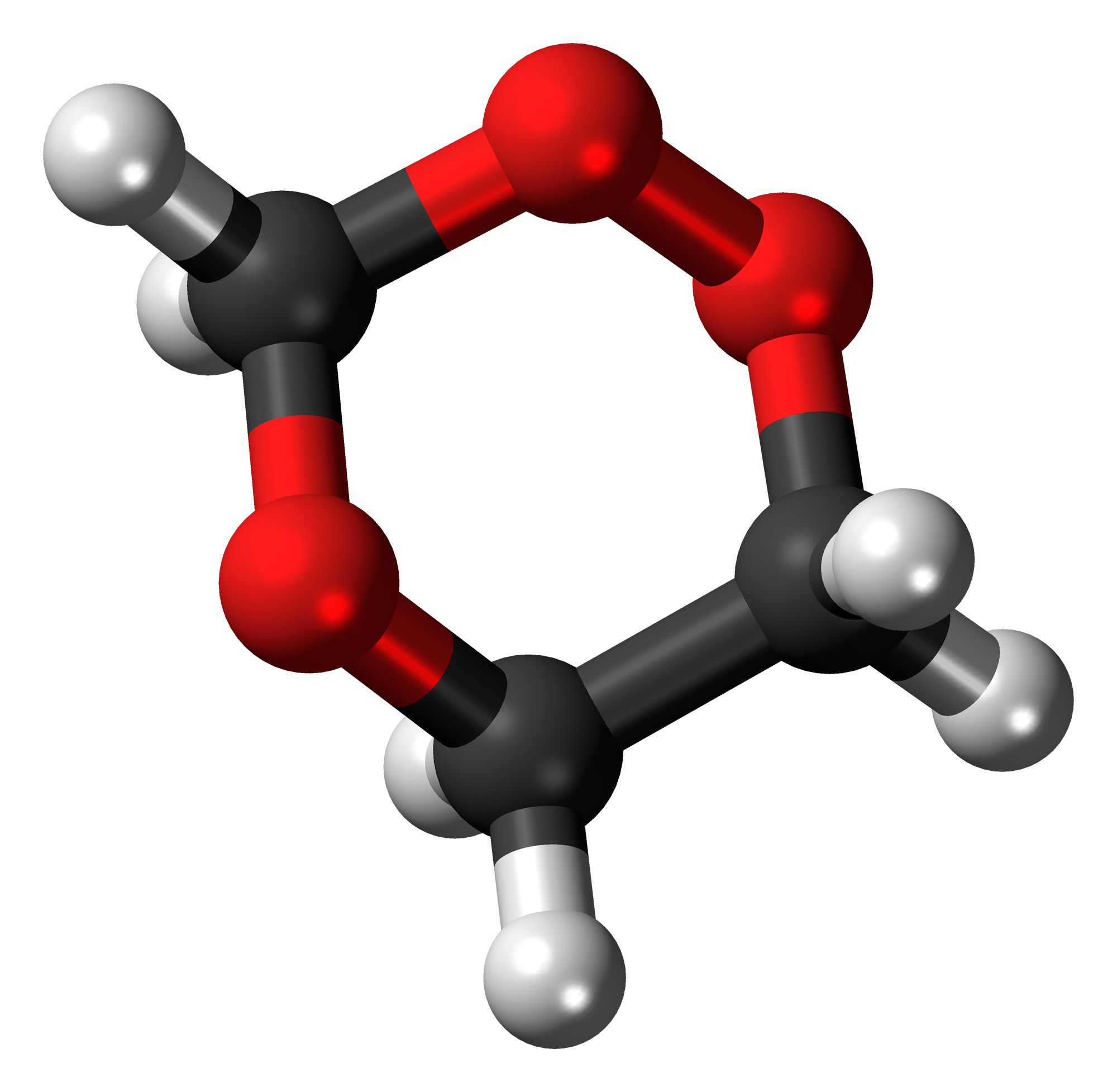

Names
- Preferred IUPAC name 1,2,4-Trioxane

Identifiers
CAS Number	7049-17-4
3D model (JSmol)	Interactive image; Interactive image
ChemSpider	10629025
PubChem CID	21584057
UNII	X5CWB98J7S
CompTox Dashboard (EPA)	DTXSID30616113
- InChI: InChI=1S/C3H6O3/c1-2-5-6-3-4-1/h1-3H2 Key: FQERLIOIVXPZKH-UHFFFAOYSA-N; InChI=1/C3H6O3/c1-2-5-6-3-4-1/h1-3H2 Key: FQERLIOIVXPZKH-UHFFFAOYAX
- SMILES: C1COCOO1; C1OCCOO1

Properties
Chemical formula	C_{3}H_{6}O_{3}
Molar mass	90.078 g·mol^{−1}

Related compounds
Related compounds	1,3,5-trioxane artemisinin
- Except where otherwise noted, data are given for materials in their standard state (at 25 °C [77 °F], 100 kPa). verify (what is ?) Infobox references

1,2,4-Trioxane is one of the isomers of trioxane. It has the molecular formula C_{3}H_{6}O_{3} and consists of a six membered ring with three carbon atoms and three oxygen atoms. The two adjacent oxygen atoms form a peroxide functional group and the other forms an ether functional group. It is like a cyclic acetal but with one of the oxygen atoms in the acetal group being replaced by a peroxide group.

1,2,4-Trioxane itself has not been isolated or characterized, but rather only studied computationally. However, it constitutes an important structural element of some more complex organic compounds. The natural compound artemisinin, isolated from the sweet wormwood plant (Artemisia annua), and some semi-synthetic derivatives are important antimalarial drugs containing the 1,2,4-trioxane ring. Completely synthetic analogs containing the 1,2,4-trioxane ring are important potential improvements over the naturally derived artemisinins. The peroxide group in the 1,2,4-trioxane core of artemisinin is cleaved in the presence of the malaria parasite leading to reactive oxygen radicals that are damaging to the parasite.
