= OSPAR Convention =

International treaty protecting North-East Atlantic marine environment

The official logo of the OSPAR Convention

The Convention for the Protection of the Marine Environment of the North-East Atlantic or OSPAR Convention is the current legislative instrument regulating international cooperation on environmental protection in the North-East Atlantic. Work carried out under the convention is managed by the OSPAR Commission, which is made up of representatives of the Governments of the 15 signatory nations, and representatives of the European Commission, representing the European Union.

== History ==
The OSPAR Convention was concluded at Paris on 22 September 1992. It combines and up-dates the 1972 Oslo Convention on dumping waste at sea and the 1974 Paris Convention on land-based sources of marine pollution. The name is likewise a combination of "Oslo" and "Paris".

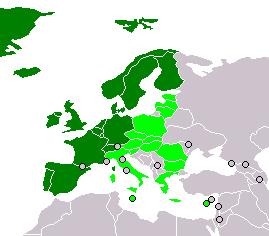
signatory states European Union

The Convention for the Protection of the Marine Environment of the North-East Atlantic was opened for signature at the Ministerial Meeting of the Oslo and Paris Commissions in Paris on 22 September 1992. The Convention has been signed and ratified by all of the Contracting Parties to the original Oslo or Paris Conventions (Belgium, Denmark, the European Community, Finland, France, Germany, Iceland, Ireland, the Netherlands, Norway, Portugal, Spain, Sweden and the United Kingdom of Great Britain and Northern Ireland) and by Luxembourg and Switzerland. The OSPAR Convention entered into force on 25 March 1998, and replaced the Oslo and Paris Conventions, but decisions and other agreements adopted under those conventions remained applicable unless they are terminated by new measures adopted under the OSPAR Convention.

Map of the OSPAR area

The first Ministerial Meeting of the OSPAR Commission at Sintra, Portugal, in 1998 adopted Annex V to the Convention, extending the cooperation of the signatory parties to cover "all human activities that might adversely affect the marine environment of the North East Atlantic". Nevertheless, programmes and measures cannot be adopted under the Convention on questions relating to fisheries management, which are currently coordinated by European nations in the north east Atlantic and North Sea by the International Council for the Exploration of the Sea (ICES). The OSPAR convention now regulates European standards on marine biodiversity, eutrophication, the release of hazardous and radioactive substances into the seas, the offshore oil and gas industry and baseline monitoring of environmental conditions.

In 2000, the OSPAR Commission published a comprehensive report on the quality of the marine environment of the North-East Atlantic. This was supported by five smaller reports on the different parts of the OSPAR maritime area –the Arctic, the Greater North Sea, the Celtic Seas, the Bay of Biscay/Golfe de Gascogne and Iberian waters, and the Wider Atlantic.

According to the fr :Association pour le contrôle de la radioactivité dans l'Ouest, if tritium and iodine 129 discharges from the La Hague site into the Alderney Race do not diminish significantly, it will be difficult to achieve the objective of zero radioelement concentrations in the North Atlantic by 2020.

In June 2007, OSPAR signatory parties agreed to amend the Convention in order to make mandatory the application of the treaty in the case of geological storage of CO_{2}. The treaty allows carbon capture and storage of carbonic anhydride from land to an offshore marine site through a pipeline that is not required to pass near offshore platforms for oil and gas exploration.

== Objectives ==
OSPAR operates in a number of areas to maintain a balance in the ecosystem and has a number of objectives.

- OSPAR is committed to maintaining the cleanliness of the seas. Indeed, combating pollution is one of their main objectives. Pollution control encompasses the management of water pollution from oil and gas installations. OSPAR is implementing measures to prevent the occurrence of eutrophication. Radioactive substances are also managed and minimised by OSPAR.
- The mission of the OSPAR is to preserve the balance of the ecosystem. This involves the restoration of habitats, the protection of animals and the protection of areas (MPAs). The latter involves the designation of areas that are more, moderately and less protected. In addition, effective management and monitoring of human activities is required to mitigate their impact on the ecosystem.
- Maintaining sustainability is achieved through the implementation of regulatory measures for fishing activities and the reduction of noise levels in the marine environment. The organisation is dedicated to the management of fishing waste and the protection of seabirds affected by climate change, as outlined in the regional action plan. With regard to noise, human activities (offshore construction, transport) generate noise which is a source of concern for marine animals that communicate, travel and hunt using sound. OSPAR is responsible for controlling noise so that it does not disturb the ecosystem.

== Collaboration ==
While OSPAR is a regional organisation, it collaborates with numerous international partners. At regional level, the Convention cooperates with HELCOM, which is responsible for protecting and preserving the Baltic Sea. The primary focus of their collaboration is the sharing of knowledge and the harmonisation of actions. NEAFC (North-East Atlantic Fisheries Commission) is another regional organisation that shares fisheries in common, enabling collaboration.

OSPAR also collaborates with Europe by working with experts. The Copernicus Marine data programme is a prime example of this. This collaboration aims to promote the sustainability and protection of the oceans. In particular, their current focus is on resolving the issue of eutrophication.

On an international level, OSPAR is working closely with the IMO to prevent pollution from ships and to establish common regulations.

It also collaborates with NGOs such as WWF and Oceana.

== Critics ==
A number of criticisms have been levelled at the OSPAR Convention.

Despite the importance attached to fishing, it is not sufficiently regulated. It can only report any anomalies to the competent authorities, whose follow-up then depends on the European Commission, which shows the limits of its power to act. The French National Assembly does not provide for any measures to be taken by OSPAR.

OSPAR also oversees the discharge of produced water from offshore oil and gas installations in the North Sea. This produced water contains chemicals that are harmful to the environment. Proper management of this water is therefore essential. In order to quantify the risks posed by produced water, OSPAR employs the RBA technique, i.e. the risk-based approach. However, this approach is being criticised by several scientists. According to certain researchers, the assessment method presents certain uncertainties and could simplify the results.

In general, the current approach to biodiversity protection is under scrutiny, with concerns being raised about its lack of equity. While OSPAR is committed to the protection of MPAs, its actions may not always align with its stated objectives. According to OSPAR, only 0.03% of areas included in MPAs benefit from a high level of protection. This indicates that 60% of MPAs are not currently designated as protected areas. This poses a significant challenge in maintaining conservation efforts due to the absence of sufficient regulatory frameworks to ensure the preservation of the MPA. The term 'illusion of protection' or 'paper park' is used to describe MPA protection. There is a significant gap between the stated objectives and the actual outcomes.

Some observers believe that certain decisions are based more on political considerations than scientific data. The case of extracting oil and gas from installations that are no longer in service is a case in point. In this context, OSPAR wants to remove the installations on the grounds that this would clean up the seabed, but refuses to turn them into artificial reefs. However, research shows that ecosystems have developed around these installations and that removing them would threaten the species that have settled there. OSPAR relies on studies that are more political than scientific, despite them not being experts. Some parties have questioned the results of environmental impact assessments (EIAs), arguing that they may lack objectivity because they are based on political rather than scientific opinions.

Although OSPAR is a recognised organisation, it is subject to the law of the sea as regulated by the United Nations Convention, which limits its actions and their effectiveness. No official legislative framework has yet been put in place. The convention is only observed at the will of the member states, who are under no obligation to adopt restrictions.

Despite numerous collaborative efforts, a lack of legal framework remains a significant challenge, raising concerns about the ecosystem's protection and coordination between institutions.

== See also ==
- Convention for the Prevention of Marine Pollution by Dumping from Ships and Aircraft
