= 1,3,5-Trioxane =

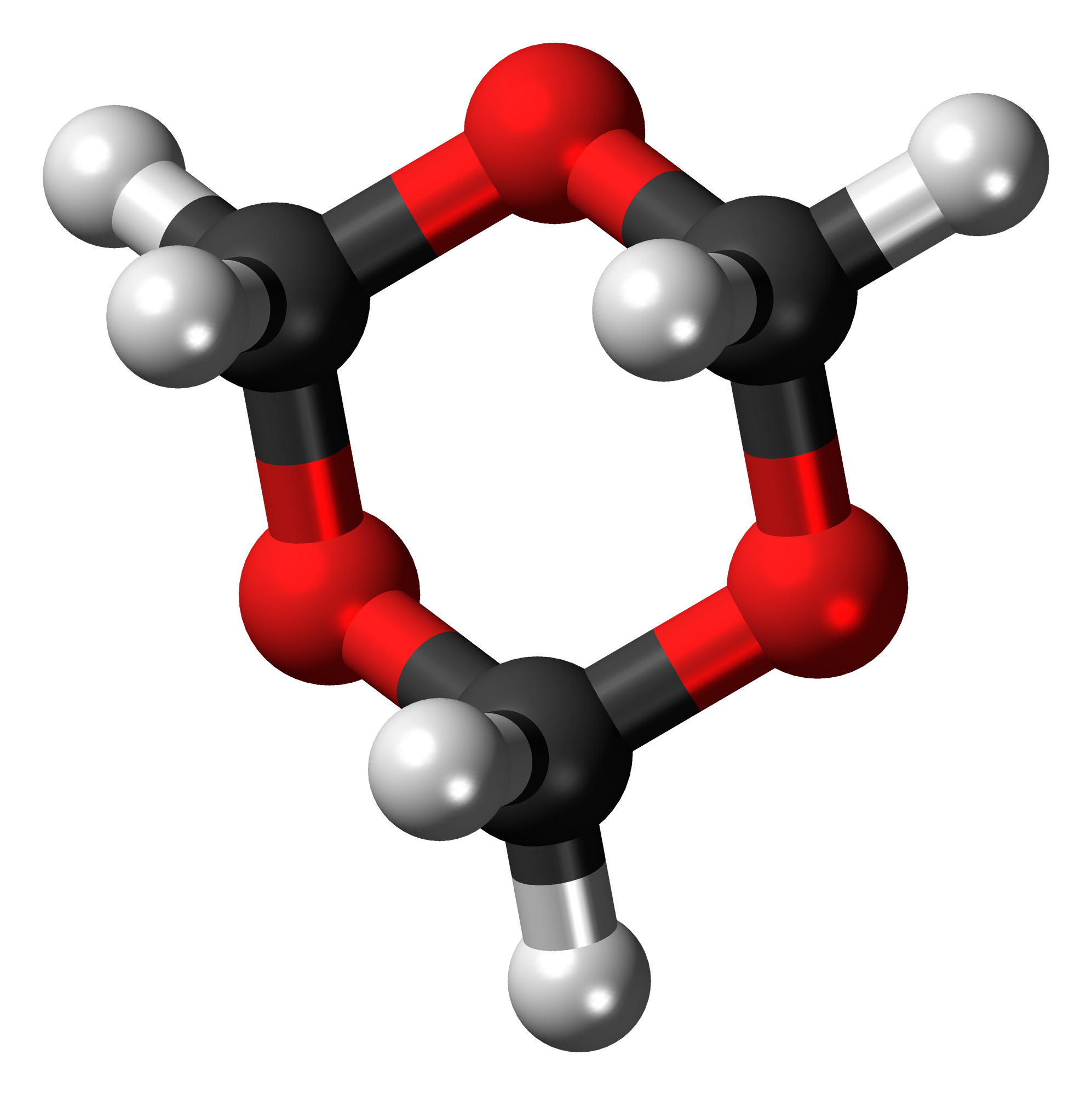

Names
- Preferred IUPAC name 1,3,5-Trioxane
- Other names s-Trioxane; 1,3,5-Trioxacyclohexane; Trioxymethylene; Metaformaldehyde

Identifiers
CAS Number	110-88-3
3D model (JSmol)	Interactive image
Beilstein Reference	102769
ChEBI	CHEBI:38043
ChEMBL	ChEMBL1495792
ChemSpider	7790
ECHA InfoCard	100.003.466
EC Number	203-812-5
Gmelin Reference	2230
PubChem CID	8081
RTECS number	YK0350000
UNII	46BNU65YNY
UN number	1325
CompTox Dashboard (EPA)	DTXSID4021925
- InChI: InChI=1S/C3H6O3/c1-4-2-6-3-5-1/h1-3H2 Key: BGJSXRVXTHVRSN-UHFFFAOYSA-N
- SMILES: O1COCOC1

Properties
Chemical formula	C_{3}H_{6}O_{3}
Molar mass	90.078 g·mol^{−1}
Appearance	White crystalline solid
Density	1.17 g/cm^{3} (65 °C)
Melting point	62 °C (144 °F; 335 K)
Boiling point	115 °C (239 °F; 388 K)
Solubility in water	221 g/L

Hazards
- GHS labelling
Pictograms	(GHS02: Flammable) (GHS07: Exclamation mark) (GHS08: Health hazard)
Signal word	Warning
Hazard statements	H228, H335, H361d
Precautionary statements	P201, P202, P210, P240, P241, P261, P271, P280, P281, P304+P340, P308+P313, P312, P370+P378, P403+P233, P405, P501
NFPA 704 (fire diamond)	2 2 0
Flash point	45 °C (113 °F; 318 K)

Related compounds
Related compounds	Formaldehyde; 1,2,4-Trioxane; 1,3,5-Trithiane; Polyoxymethylene
- Except where otherwise noted, data are given for materials in their standard state (at 25 °C [77 °F], 100 kPa). verify (what is ?) Infobox references

1,3,5-Trioxane, sometimes also called trioxane, is a chemical compound with molecular formula C_{3}H_{6}O_{3}. It is a white, highly water-soluble solid with a chloroform-like odor. It is a stable cyclic trimer of formaldehyde, and one of the three trioxane isomers; its molecular backbone consists of a six-membered ring with three carbon atoms alternating with three oxygen atoms.

== Production ==
Trioxane can be obtained by the acid-catalyzed cyclic trimerization of formaldehyde in concentrated aqueous solution.

== Uses ==
Trioxane can be used interchangeably with formaldehyde and with paraformaldehyde, however the cyclic structure is more stable and it can require high temperatures in order to react. It is a precursor for the production of polyoxymethylene plastics, of which about one million tons per year are produced. Other applications exploit its tendency to release formaldehyde. As such it is used as a binder in textiles, wood products, etc. Trioxane is combined with hexamine and compressed into solid bars to make hexamine fuel tablets, used by the military and outdoorsmen as a cooking fuel.

In the laboratory, trioxane is used as an anhydrous source of formaldehyde.

== See also ==
- Formaldehyde
- Paraformaldehyde
- Dioxane
- 1,3,5-Trioxanetrione
