= World Sustainable Energy Days =

The World Sustainable Energy Days is an annual sustainability conference held in Austria. It hosts events centred on sustainable energy production and use, which covers energy efficiency and renewable energy sources for buildings, industry and transport. The events that take place during the World Sustainable Energy Days present the latest technology trends, outstanding examples and European strategies and offer opportunities to establish new partnerships. The conference raises awareness of green energy and energy efficiency.

Since 1992 every year in March experts and decision makers from all over the world flock to Upper Austria to attend the events - in general the conference attracts between 900 and 1,000 participants from 55-60 countries.

In parallel to the World Sustainable Energy Days, the Energiesparmesse, an exhibition and trade show dedicated to renewable energy sources and energy efficiency, is held. It attracts around 100,000 visitors and around 1,000 exhibiting companies.

The World Sustainable Energy Days are organised by the O.Ö. Energiesparverband (O.Ö. Energiesparverband in German), the regional energy agency of Upper Austria.

== See also ==
- 1992 in the environment
- Energy law
