= Trioxane =

Group of chemical compounds

Trioxane isomers: 1,2,3-trioxane (left), 1,2,4-trioxane (middle), and 1,3,5-trioxane (right)

Trioxane refers to any of three isomeric organic compounds composed of a six-membered ring with three carbon atoms and three oxygen atoms, having the molecular formula C_{3}H_{6}O_{3}.

== Isomers ==
The three isomers are:

- 1,2,3-Trioxane, a hypothetical compound
- 1,2,4-Trioxane, a hypothetical compound whose skeleton occurs as a structural component of some antimalarial agents (artemisinin and similar drugs)
- 1,3,5-Trioxane, a trimer of formaldehyde used as fuel and in plastics manufacturing, and also as a solid fuel tablet when combined with hexamine
