= Sierra Club v. Babbitt =

United States District Court case

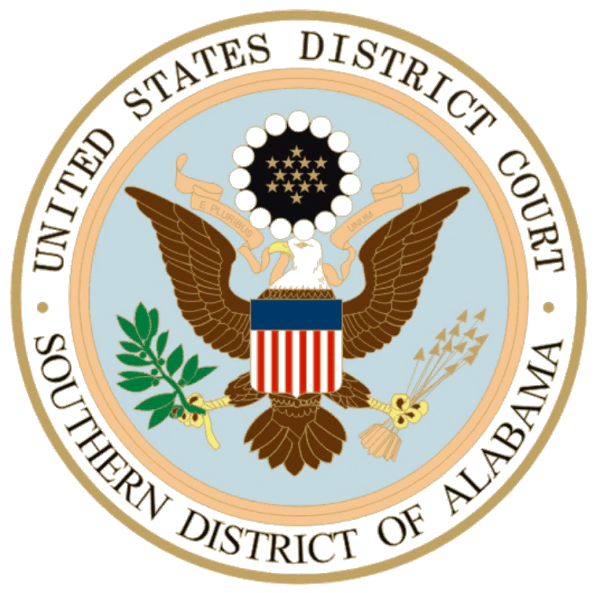
- Court: United States District Court for the Southern District of Alabama
- Full case name: Sierra Club, et al. v. Bruce Babbitt, et al.
- Decided: August 4, 1998
- Docket nos.: 1:97-cv-00691
- Citation: 15 F. Supp. 2d 1274

Holding
- The District Court remanded the decision to issue the permits to the FWS. It directed the FWS to gather the necessary data and conduct the required scientific analysis in order to determine whether the permits issued meet requirements under the ESA and the NEPA. The court stressed that the FWS must do more than merely go through the motions in performing its duties to protect the Alabama beach mouse from extinction.

Laws applied
- ESA, NEPA

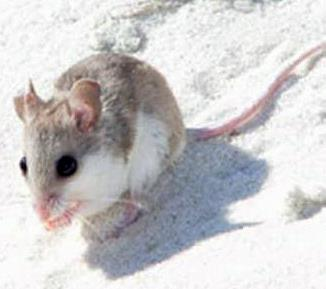
Endangered Alabama Beach Mouse (Peromyscus polionotus ammobates).

Sierra Club v. Babbitt, 15 F. Supp. 2d 1274 (S.D. Ala. 1998), is a United States District Court for the Southern District of Alabama case in which the Sierra Club and several other environmental organizations and private citizens challenged the United States Fish and Wildlife Service (FWS). Plaintiffs filed action seeking declaratory injunctive relief regarding two incidental take permits (ITPs) issued by the FWS for the construction of two isolated high-density housing complexes in habitat of the endangered Alabama beach mouse (Peromyscus polionotus ammobates). The District Court ruled that the FWS must reconsider its decision to allow high-density development on the Alabama coastline that might harm the endangered Alabama beach mouse. The District Court found that the FWS violated both the Endangered Species Act (ESA) and the National Environmental Policy Act (NEPA) by permitting construction on the dwindling beach mouse habitat.

== Background information ==
=== Endangered Species Act ===
The ESA of 1973 was signed by President Richard Nixon on December 28, 1973, and provides for the conservation of species that are endangered or threatened throughout all or a significant portion of their range, and the conservation of the ecosystems on which they depend. Under the ESA, species are defined as subspecies, varieties, and (for vertebrates) distinct population segments. The ESA protects endangered and threatened species and their habitats by prohibiting the "take" of listed animals and the interstate or international trade in listed plants and animals, including their parts and products, except under federal permit. Section 9(a)(1) of the ESA sets out the general prohibition on taking listed species. Take is defined as, "to harass, harm, pursue, hunt, shoot, wound, kill, trap, capture, or collect or attempt to engage in any such conduct."

=== Habitat Conservation Plans ===
In 1982, Congress amended the ESA to allow limited take of listed threatened and endangered species to lawful development projects. This amendment requires the issuance of an Incidental Take Permit (ITP) by either the Secretary of Interior or the Secretary of Commerce. To mitigate possible take of listed species, Section 10(a) of the ESA requires that the parties obtaining an ITP must submit a Habitat Conservation Plan (HCP). A HCP is a required part of an application for an ITP, a permit issued under the ESA to private entities including private citizens, corporations, Tribes, States, and counties with undertaking projects that might result in the destruction of an endangered or threatened species. The HCP lays out the proposed actions, determining the effects of those actions on affected wildlife species and their habitats, and defining measures to minimize and mitigate adverse effects. The FWS and the National Marine Fisheries Service (NMFS) oversee the HCP program.

=== National Environmental Policy Act ===
In 1969, the National Environmental Policy Act (NEPA) was one of the first laws ever written that established a broad national framework for protecting the environment. NEPA's basic policy is to assure that all branches of government give proper consideration to the environment, prior to undertaking of any major federal action that could significantly affect the environment. A project is federally controlled when it requires federal licensing, federal funding, or is undertaken by the federal government. When such a project is determined to have significant effects on the human environment, an environmental impact statement (EIS) is required. An EIS for a proposed project outlines in detail the proposed actions, alternative actions (including no action), and their probable environmental ramifications. The environmental impact statements must cover plausible bases, which are generally determined by the rule of reason.

== Major parties ==
=== Sierra Club ===
The Sierra Club was the major petitioner in this case. It was founded in 1892 by John Muir in San Francisco, California, and is one of America's oldest, largest, and most influential grassroots environmental organizations. The Sierra Club's mission is to explore, enjoy, and protect the wild places of the earth; to practice and promote the responsible use of the earth's ecosystems and resources; to educate and enlist humanity to protect and restore the quality of the natural and human environment; and to use all lawful means to carry out those objectives.

=== Fish and Wildlife Service (FWS) ===
The FWS was the major respondent of this case. It is a federal government agency within the United States Department of the Interior dedicated to the management of fish, wildlife, and natural habitats. The mission of the agency is "working with others to conserve, protect, and enhance fish, wildlife, plants and their habitats for the continuing benefit of the American people." Under the ESA, FWS is responsible for protecting endangered and threatened species and their habitats. Under provisions of section 7(a)(2) of the ESA, a federal agency that carries out, permits, licenses, funds, or otherwise authorizes activities that may affect a listed species, must consult with the FWS to ensure that its actions are not likely to jeopardize the continued existence of any listed species.

Bruce Babbitt served as the U.S. Secretary of the Interior from 1993 to 2001. As the Secretary of the Interior, Secretary Babbitt was responsible for overseeing several government agencies, which included the FWS.

== Facts ==
The remaining Alabama beach mouse habitat is located on the Fort Morgan Peninsula of the Alabama coast.

The Alabama beach mouse, a sand-colored mouse indigenous to the beaches and sandy fields of southern Alabama, was listed as endangered in 1985 due to the drastic destruction of the species' habitat by residential and commercial development, recreational activity and tropical storms. At the time of listing, 671 acres of beach mouse habitat remained on the Fort Morgan Peninsula on the Alabama coast. The FWS speculated that the remaining habitat may not be an adequate area to allow the beach mouse population to recover. Since then, the habitat has been further reduced by commercial and residential development, a golf course, and a series of hurricanes. Nevertheless, the FWS permitted two isolated high density housing complexes within the beach mouse habitat including the Aronov project and the Fort Morgan project, which was brought to suit in this case.

The ESA does not offer much exception for developers that find an endangered species on the land they wish to develop. In order to get permits, the developers must prepare a HCP, which shows the impact on the species, and ways to mitigate that impact. The FWS approved the developer's plans and issued permits for two Fort Morgan developments. They claimed that the permits "will not jeopardize the beach mouse" or harm its critical habitat. However, the FWS did remain concerned over whether the mitigation in the permit plans was to the maximum extent practicable, as required by the ESA.

== Arguments ==
The Sierra Club challenged the issuance of these permits under the ESA and the NEPA, asking the District Court to suspend the permits, based on the HCP, and until the FWS revised its environmental analysis and permit conditions.

The plaintiffs brought three claims: 1) the level of off-site mitigation funding was inadequate and lacked any rational basis; 2) the FWS's offsite mitigation policy was inconsistent; and 3) the FWS's reliance on unnamed sources to pay the additional costs for providing adequate off-site mitigation was arbitrary and capricious.

First, the Sierra Club claimed that the mitigation part of the HCP was not sufficient under the ESA. In response, the FWS stated that its concerns were met when the applicant added mitigation measures. However, the FWS's own field offices had concerns over the impacts of the planned development on the Alabama beach mouse. The regional office stated that the effects of the Fort Morgan project were the largest of any beach mouse HCP to date, but provided the least mitigation. In court, the FWS claimed that mitigation concerns were addressed before the Biological Opinion and that they were going to require additional funds for offsite mitigation. The plaintiffs held that the FWS decision was not rational.

Second, the Sierra Club claimed that the FWS failed to develop standards to determine the appropriate amount of mitigation necessary for the survival of the beach mouse. The FWS decision to grant permits was inconsistent with their own Habitat Conservation Planning Handbook. According to the Handbook, mitigation measures should be as consistent as possible for all HCPs with similarly situated species. The Handbook states that "the Service should not apply inconsistent mitigation policies for the same species, unless differences are based on biological or other good reasons and are clearly explained. The court examined mitigation requirements for other projects within the beach mouse habitat and found no consistency. The court did not find that the FWS followed their own guidelines. What the court did find, however, was that the FWS, had no justification for the issuance of the permits.

Third, the Sierra Club also challenged the plan because the sources which were intended to fund the offsite mitigation efforts, remained unnamed. The FWS mentioned that additional funds were needed for mitigation efforts, but they did not include where the funding would come from. The Biological Opinion required additional funds from nonprofit organizations in order to fully mitigate the projects, but never stated how much, from whom, or the likelihood the funds would ever be acquired. The court agreed and cited the FWS's own documentation, which stated that the "Applicant's offsite mitigation funding would have to be combined with additional funds from a non-profit organization in order to purchase a large tract or several tracts for mitigation purposes." Without a given source of funding or specific amount to be spent, the court could find no rational basis for issuance of the permits.

== Analysis under National Environmental Policy Act ==
FWS failed to prepare an environmental impact statement (EIS) as required by the NEPA. The NEPA requires that federal agencies like the FWS consider the environmental consequences of proposed actions to ensure fully informed and well-considered decisions. A project that may adversely affect an endangered species or its critical habitat is considered to significantly affect the environment, requiring an EIS. Rather than prepare an EIS, the FWS issued a "finding of no significant impact" for the Fort Morgan developments, concluding its analysis of possible impacts on the Alabama beach mouse.

There are four criteria to be considered in determining whether an agency's decision not to prepare an EIS is arbitrary and capricious: First, the agency must have accurately identified the relevant environmental concern. Second, once the agency has identified the problem it must have taken a "hard look" at the problem in preparing the Environmental Assessment (EA). Third, if a finding of no significant impact is made, the agency must be able to make a convincing case for its finding. Last, if the agency does find an impact of true significance, preparation of an EIS can be avoided only if the agency finds that changes or safeguards in the project sufficiently reduce the impact to a minimum.

After a careful review of the Administrative Record, the Court was persuaded that many of the important "facts" on which the FWS based its decision appear to be assumptions, presumptions, or conclusions themselves — not facts based on any evidence, documents, or data in the Administrative Record.

== Opinion of court ==
The plaintiff's motion for preliminary injunction was granted, and the defendant's cross-motion for summary judgment was denied.

The District Court remanded the decision to issue the permits to the FWS. It directed the FWS to gather the necessary data and conduct the required scientific analysis in order to determine whether the permits issued meet requirements under the ESA and the NEPA. The court stressed that the FWS must do more than merely go through the motions in performing its duties to protect the Alabama beach mouse from extinction.

The court agreed with the Sierra Club and found that the FWS ignored its initial concerns, failing to determine if the proposed amount of mitigation funding could provide adequate mitigation. The court noted the complete lack of consideration or explanation of the amount of mitigation funding in the plan or permits. Without analysis or consideration, the court concluded that the FWS cannot support its decision that the amount of mitigation funding was adequate and found the issuance of permits arbitrary and capricious.

Additionally, the court held that the FWS's reliance on unnamed sources for offsite mitigation was contrary to the law and unsupported by any factually reliable basis in the Administrative Record.

== Significance and subsequent developments ==
Although environmental groups have challenged a number of incidental take permits in court, judges typically defer to the expert judgment of the FWS. Sierra Club v. Babbitt was one of the few cases where the plaintiffs won. The Chevron deference rule (see Chevron U.S.A., Inc. v. Natural Resources Defense Council, Inc.), in which the Supreme Court holds that courts should defer to agency interpretations of such statutes unless they are unreasonable, was used in this case. The environmental statutes were clear and unambiguous. However, the FWS interpretation of the laws were not reasonable. This sets the stage for regulatory federal agencies being held accountable for noncompliance of environmental statutes and irrational decision making.
