= Bon Secour National Wildlife Refuge =

- IUCN category IV (habitat/species management area)
- Location within Alabama Location within the United States
- Location: Baldwin County and Mobile County, Alabama, United States
- Nearest city: Gulf Shores, Alabama
- Coordinates: 30.24°N 87.82°W
- Area: 7,157.72 acres (29 km^{2})
- Established: 1980
- Visitors: 50,000 (in 2005)
- Governing body: U.S. Fish and Wildlife Service
- Website: Bon Secour NWR

Bon Secour National Wildlife Refuge is a 7,157-acre (29 km^{2}) National Wildlife Refuge located in five separate units in Baldwin and Mobile Counties, United States, directly west of Gulf Shores, Alabama on the Fort Morgan Peninsula. The refuge serves as a resting and feeding area for migratory birds and as a sanctuary for native flora and fauna. The refuge is one of the largest undeveloped parcels of land on the Alabama coast.

Established in 1980, Bon Secour (the name, in French, means "safe harbor") is smaller than most other national wildlife refuges, and is divided into Sand Bayou, Perdue, Little Point Clear, Fort Morgan, and Little Dauphin Island.

The Perdue unit is the most developed. Most units are located on the Fort Morgan Peninsula in Baldwin County, except Little Dauphin Island, which is in Mobile County. More than 50,000 guests visit the refuge annually. The fiscal year 2005 budget was $404,000.

Protected habitats within the refuge include beaches and sand dunes, western portion of Little Lagoon, scrub forest, fresh and saltwater marshes, fresh water swamps, and uplands.

== Wildlife ==
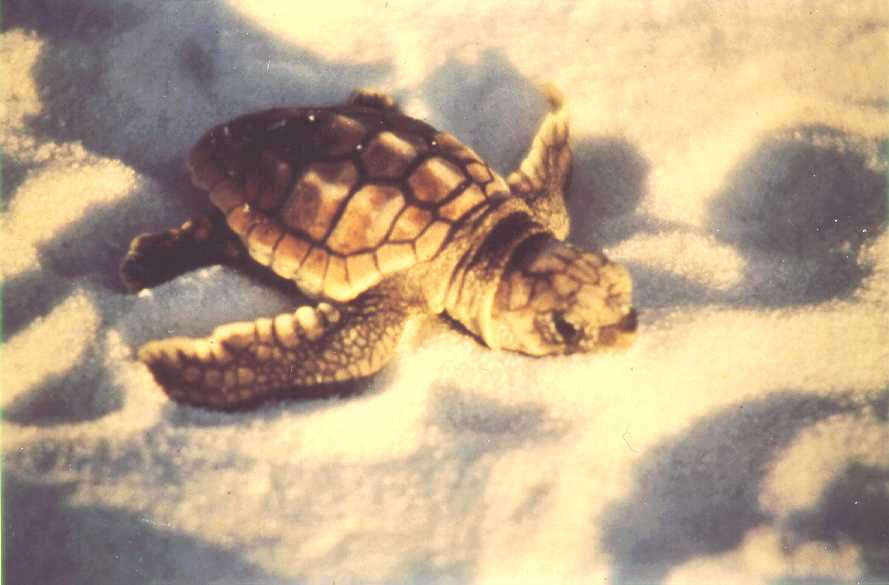
A young sea turtle at Bon Secour

The refuge seeks to conserve an undisturbed beach and dune ecosystem which will serve as a refuge for endangered and threatened plant, fish, and wildlife species, as well as a habitat for migratory birds.

Some of the refuge's endangered species are the Alabama beach mouse which lives among the sand dunes and sea oats, and green, loggerhead, and Kemp's ridley sea turtles, which nest along the beach.

Approximately 400 species of birds have been identified on the refuge, usually during migratory seasons, ranging from ospreys and herons to seven species of hummingbirds. There have been sightings of deer, bobcat, alligators, red fox, wild pig, coyotes, and armadillos.

== Trail networks ==
There are four trails in the Perdue unit of the refuge with a combined length of five miles.

- Pine Beach Trail
- Jeff Friend Trail
- Gator Lake Trail
- Centennial Trail

== Developments ==
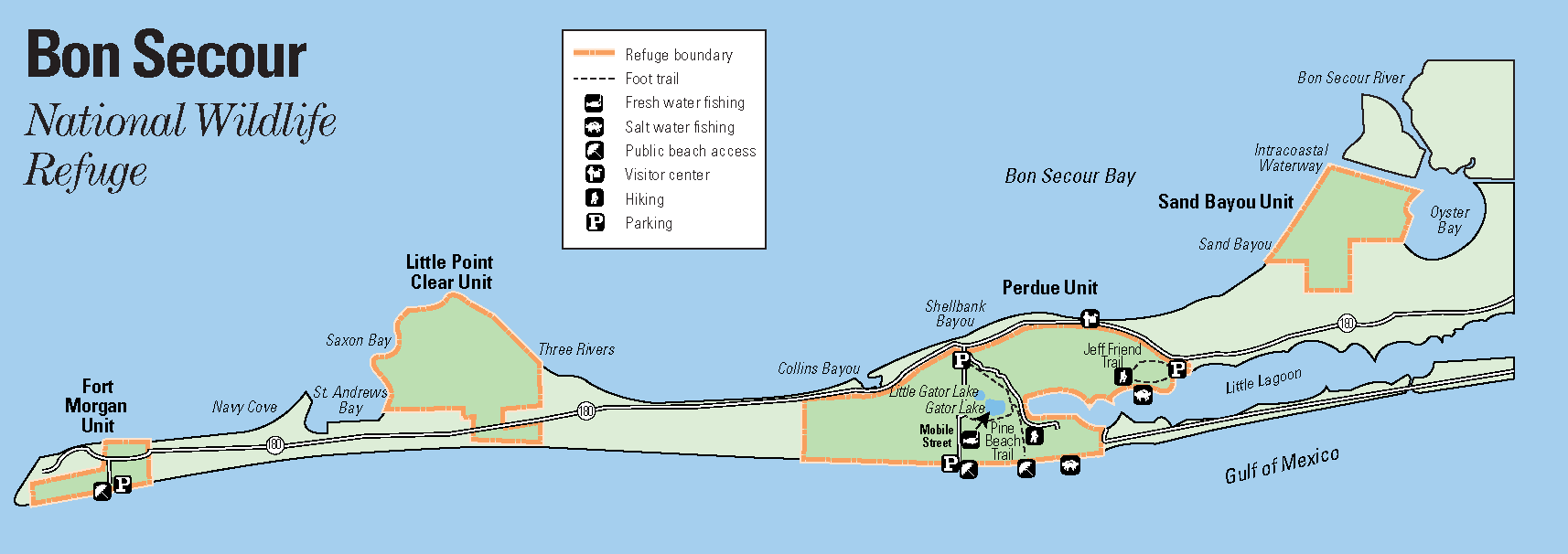
Map of Bon Secour

Bon Secour suffered extensive damage on 16 September 2004 due to a near direct hit from Hurricane Ivan and the accompanying 20-foot (6 m) storm surge. Ivan destroyed much of the wildlife habitat and left extensive debris in its wake including propane tanks, boats, jet skis, trailers, parts of buildings, and other construction debris. The Jeff Friend and Pine Beach trail systems suffered extensive damage. Debris cluttered the Jeff Friend unit, while the Pine Beach trail suffered the loss of both the Gator Lake boardwalk and observation pavilion. Following repairs and the replacement of the boardwalk, both trails are now open to the public. The dunes of the Purdue and Fort Morgan units suffered extensive damage but natural processes are beginning to repair the damage.

After cleaning up a second wave of less-extensive damage from Hurricane Katrina, limited access to the refuge beach in the Purdue unit reopened in October 2005.

== See also ==
- List of National Wildlife Refuges

== Images ==
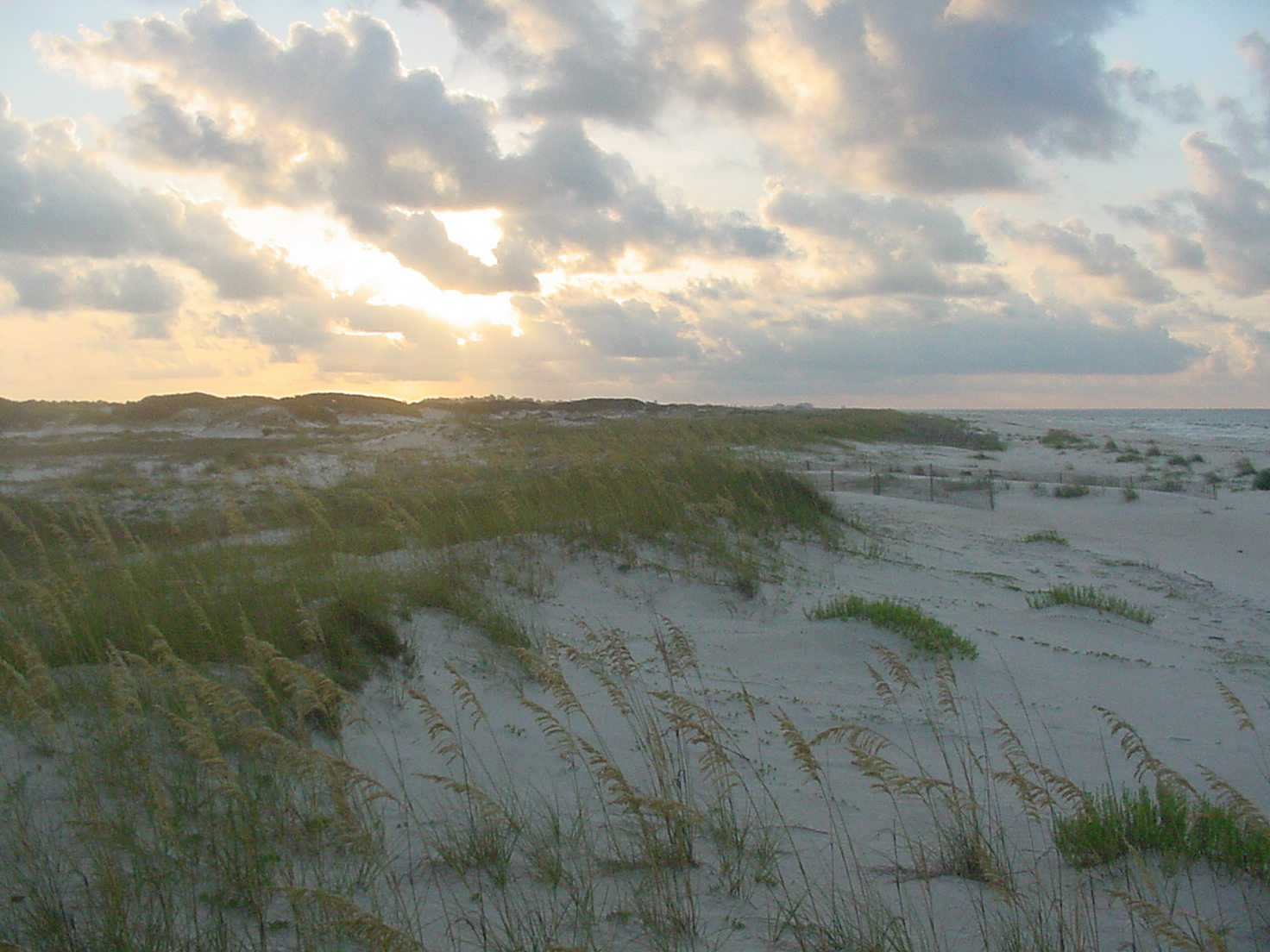
Sunrise at Bon Secour (2001)

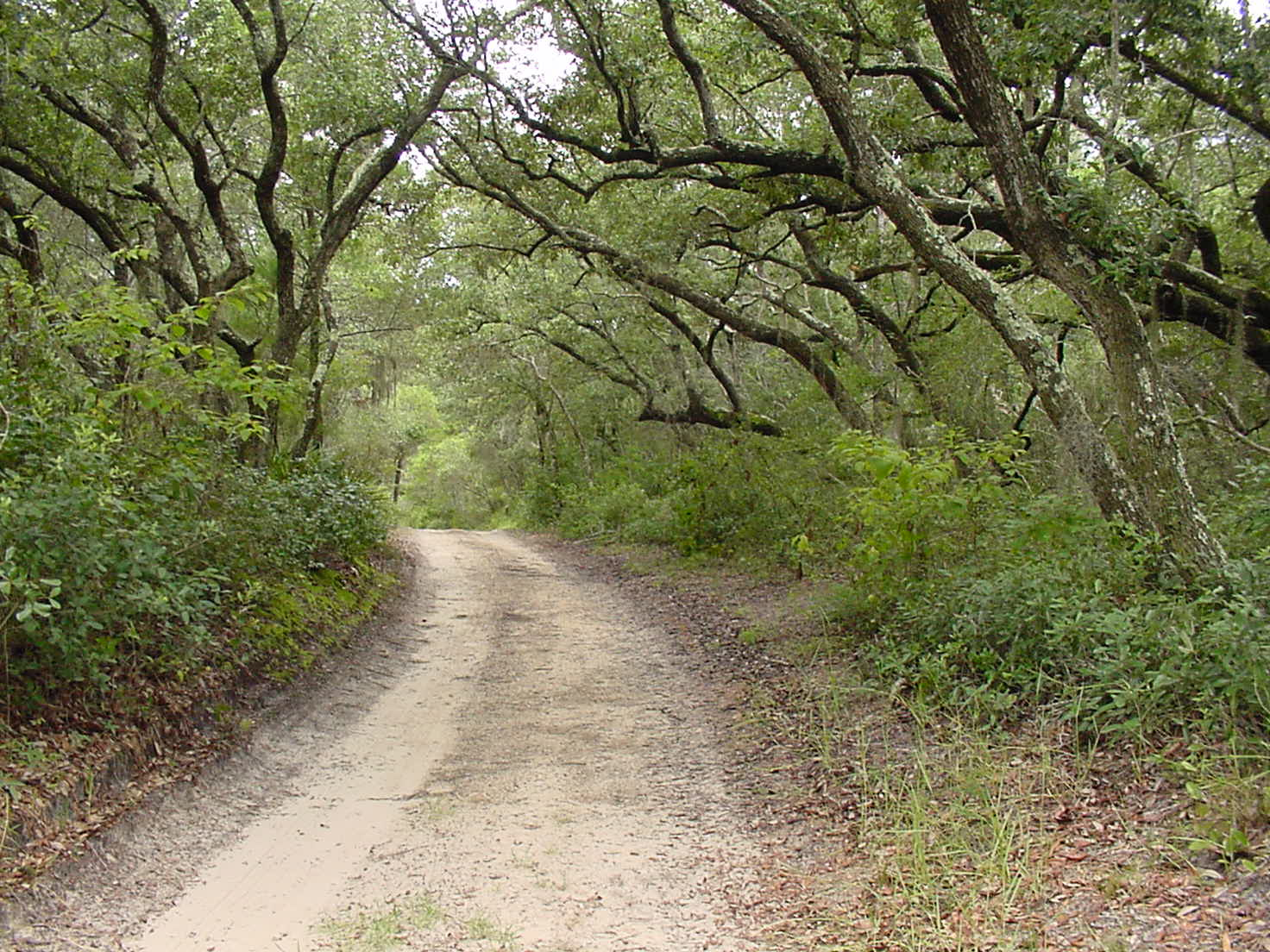
View from Mobile Road in Bon Secour

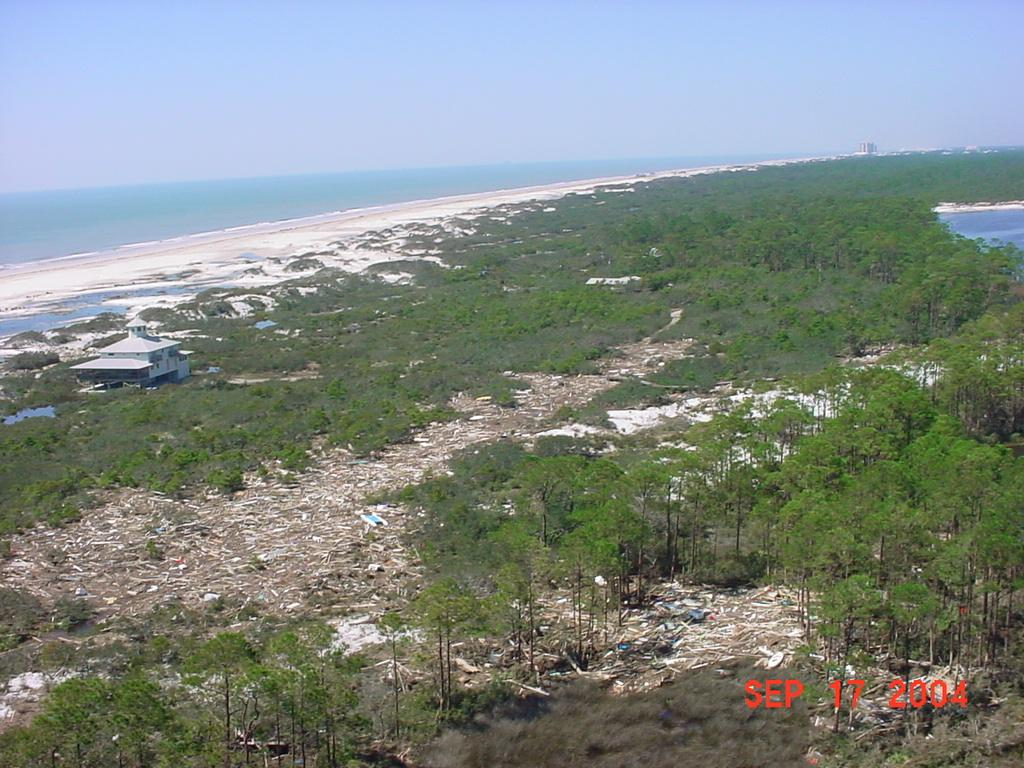
Damage from Hurricane Ivan (2004)
