= Habitat Conservation Plan =

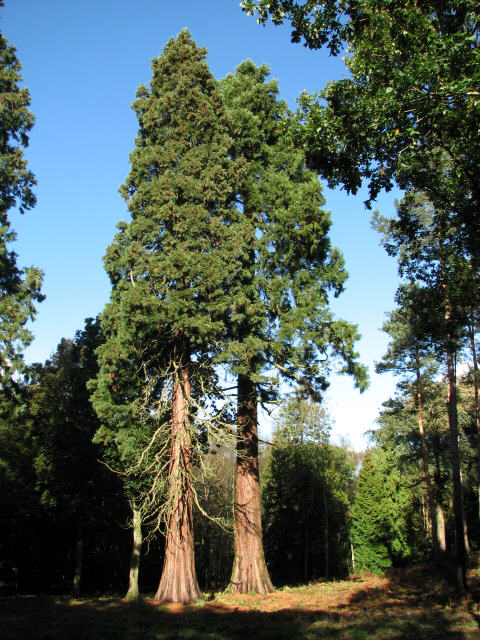
Mature redwood trees in Gilham's Heath Plantation. Incidental take permits and HCPs are required for deforestation activities that have the potential to result in an incidental take of federally listed wildlife.

A Habitat Conservation Plan (HCP) is a required part of an application for an Incidental Take Permit, a permit issued under the United States Endangered Species Act (ESA) to private entities undertaking projects that might result in the destruction of an endangered or threatened species. It is a planning document that ensures that the anticipated take of a listed species will be minimized or mitigated by conserving the habitat upon which the species depend, thereby contributing to the recovery of the species as a whole.

== Background ==
The importance of preserving rare species was legally recognized in 1973 when the Endangered Species Act (ESA) was signed into federal law. The purpose of the ESA is not only to protect species that have been listed as threatened or endangered, but also to conserve the ecosystems upon which those species depend. In aiming to protect species in danger of becoming extinct, the ESA prohibits actions that have the potential to result in a "taking" of any listed species.

The term "take" under the ESA refers to any attempt or action involving the harassment, harm, pursuit, hunting, shooting, wounding, killing, trapping, capturing, or collecting of any listed species. Under this definition, the alteration of habitat that results in injury to, or death of, any listed species by preventing essential behavior (such as breeding, feeding or sheltering) is considered unlawful "harm". The United States Fish and Wildlife Service (USFWS) and the National Marine Fisheries Service (NMFS) are the lead agencies tasked with the implementation of the ESA and are therefore responsible for regulating prohibited and allowable activities. While the primary objective of the ESA is the protection of endangered species, and the take of such species is considered unlawful, the ESA is not absolute.

In 1982, amendments were made to the 1973 ESA which authorize the Secretary of the Interior and the Secretary of Commerce to allow the take of federally listed species (Endangered Species Act, Section 10a(1)(B)). When non-federal activities that would otherwise be legal have the potential to result in the take of a listed species for example, they may be allowed under an Incidental Take Permit, obtained through the USFWS. To mitigate the take of listed species, Section 10 of the ESA requires that parties wishing to obtain an Incidental Take Permit must submit a conservation plan, hereafter referred to as a "Habitat Conservation Plan" or "HCP," with their application.

== Phases of Developing a HCP ==
=== I. Pre-application process ===
==== Determine permit applicant(s)/HCP preparer(s) ====
In determining the party to prepare a HCP and application for an Incidental Take Permit, two primary factors must be considered; first, the party must be capable of overseeing the implementation of the HCP once approved and second, the party must be capable of funding the implementation of the HCP. Beyond these requirements, parties can vary based on the scope of the proposed action. For example, a single landowner may be the sole preparer of a HCP if they intend to obtain an Incidental Take Permit for an action on their own property and they are the only interested party. For large-scale projects such as those covering a region of land rather than a single property, or those with multiple interested parties rather than a single landowner, the permittee may be a group such as a local or governmental agency.

==== Determine the members of the steering committee (optional) ====
For large-scale projects, applicants have the option of forming a steering committee composed of persons, such as stakeholders, with an interest in the HCP planning area or affected species. The purpose of a steering committee is to provide the applicant with direction, guidance, advice, and assistance in developing the HCP. Although the development and participation of a steering committee is not a requirement in preparing a HCP, it can be found valuable in facilitating the HCP process when multiple groups with differing interests and opinions regarding the project are involved.

==== Consultation with the U.S. Fish and Wildlife Service and National Marine Fisheries Service ====
After the applicant and steering committee members have been determined, consultation with USFWS and NMFS is recommended to ensure that responsible parties have a thorough understanding of requirements and resources available for the development phase of the HCP.

=== II. Development process ===
==== Generate a species list ====
Once the applicant has decided to initiate the development of a HCP, they must identify the species of concern that the HCP will be developed for. All federally listed animal species that have the potential to be impacted by the proposed action/project must be included in this list. Additional unlisted species may also be considered in the HCP. Including these additional species may be beneficial in some cases, if the proposed action has the potential to impact species that are not federally listed at the time the HCP is being developed but are anticipated to be listed within the active duration of the permit; in which case, the HCP would need to be revised to include the newly listed species and may further delay the proposed action. (Note: Incidental take permits and HCPs are not required for the incidental take of listed plant species; however, applicants are encouraged to incorporate federally listed plants in the HCP or planning process.)

Habitat-based approach

An alternative method to developing a HCP for target species of concern is to develop a HCP for a particular habitat type. Under this approach, a specific habitat type found within the HCP area is selected as the focus of the HCP by the permittee and USFWS/NMFS based on the species known to use the habitat. The habitat-based HCP must consider all sensitive species known to use the particular habitat type and all of their habitat-related needs. All species considered within the habitat-based HCP may be included under the Incidental Take Permit. The benefit of developing a habitat-based HCP rather than a species-based HCP is that, if prepared properly, a single HCP would theoretically benefit multiple species or an entire ecosystem rather than only protecting the species listed under the ESA.

==== Define geographic boundaries ====
Once the target species or habitat type to be considered in the HCP have been identified, the geographic boundaries of the planning area need to be established. It is important to be precise when defining the land area to which the HCP will apply, with regards to impacts associated with the proposed action, to circumvent potential problems in later phases of the development process. The geographic boundaries of the HCP should encompass all areas that will be directly impacted by the proposed action and any areas where an incidental take has the potential to occur as a result of the proposed action. (Note: For projects covering a large amount of land, the project area may be divided into separate entities with their own set of requirements, rather than applying a single plan's criteria to a diverse region.)

==== Gather biological data ====
After delineating the boundaries of the HCP area and the species within that area to be included in the HCP, current biological information for each of those species must be obtained. Data pertaining to the species' ecology, geographical distribution, and occurrence is required and may be available from existing sources. Guidance for locating this information is provided by USFWS and NMFS. If existing information is not available or sufficient for the requirements of the HCP, biological studies must be completed to supplement this requirement. If a biological study is determined necessary, USFWS and NMFS can suggest appropriate methods based on the species of concern.

==== Discuss proposed activities ====
After sufficient biological information has been collected for each of the species included in the HCP, the applicant must provide a discussion of all proposed activities that have a potential to result in an incidental take of said species. This portion of the HCP is where the applicant provides a detailed comprehensive description of the proposed action/project, which can vary in depth based on the scale of the project and HCP area. For the purpose of long-term planning, applicants are encouraged to include any actions that they have control over that are reasonably foreseeable to occur during the active permit period.

Low-Effect HCP

Due to the varying degrees by which a species may be impacted from a project, the Low-Effect HCP category is established to distinguish projects that are expected to have "minor or negligible effects on federally listed, proposed, or candidate species and their habitats or environmental values or resources". Low-Effect HCPs have a simplified and shortened application/approval process compared to a regular HCP. USFWS and NMFS will review the HCP and determine if it may be considered within the low-effect category or not.

==== Determine significance of anticipated incidental take ====
In requesting a permit that will authorize the incidental take of a listed species, the applicant must determine the extent of the potential take. To do this, the methods for calculating incidental take must be established. First, the number of individuals of each species, or number of acres of specific habitat, of concern that occur within the geographic boundaries of the HCP area must be determined. Subsequently, incidental take may be calculated based on the number of animals expected to be "killed, harmed, or harassed" as a result of the proposed action/project. If the applicant is incapable of determining the number of individuals/acres that occur in the area or the number that are expected to be impacted, incidental take may be calculated based on the acres of habitat anticipated to be affected by the proposed project. Once the number of individual species or acres of habitat are confirmed, the probability that proposed activities will result in the take of a species must be evaluated.

==== Develop a mitigation program ====
After an allowable level of take is determined, the applicant may begin to prepare the mitigation program. Because projects requiring an Incidental Take Permit are so diverse, applicable mitigation measures should be equally diverse; therefore, limits and rules are not established for this process.

Common mitigation measures often include the following:

1. Avoid the impact
2. Minimize the impact
3. Rectify the impact
4. Reduce/eliminate the impact over time
5. Compensate for the impact

The general goals of a mitigation program are to offset the immediate incidental take by either positively contributing to the species as a whole or to the objectives of the recovery plan designed for that species by USFWS.

Mitigating for habitat loss

Most projects requiring an Incidental Take Permit involve impacts to, or losses of, habitat. Mitigating for habitat loss requires either the replacement or protection of habitat within the HCP area or at another location. This may be accomplished through a variety of methods including:

1. Acquiring existing habitat;
2. Employing conservation easements to protect existing habitat;
3. Improving or restoring degraded habitat;
4. Management of habitats to achieve specific conditions; or
5. Creating new habitat.

Examples of habitat mitigation programs

- Habitat Banking- used to mitigate for habitat loss by designating and protecting land through conservation easements within the HCP area during the design phase of the project.
- Mitigation Credit System- uses protected (banked) lands as credits available for purchase. This system enables parties capable of protecting large areas to receive monetary gain from other parties requiring habitat mitigation. Likewise, this system is beneficial for parties not capable of protecting sufficient habitat within their HCP area by enabling them to quickly purchase credits that satisfy their mitigation requirements.
- Mitigation Fund- involves making monetary contributions of an established amount to an account that is used as a habitat acquisition fund.

In general, it is recommended that habitat mitigation be located reasonably close to the location of habitat impacted by the proposed action/project, provide similar habitat types, and support the same species expected to be impacted by the proposed action/project; however, these attributes vary from project to project. It is typically expected that the extent of mitigation should mirror the proposed impact. For example, if a project will result in permanent destruction of habitat, mitigation measures will likely require either the creation of new habitat or the protection of habitat, and mitigated habitat should be permanently protected. Similarly, mitigation for Low-Effect HCPs and small projects may involve a payment to a fund or purchasing mitigation credits.

==== Develop a monitoring program ====
To ensure the effectiveness of the HCP, it is essential for monitoring to be implemented throughout the development of the action/project and following its completion. HCP monitoring programs are recommended to incorporate the following features: (Note: Monitoring programs should be designed in a way that will adequately identify trends in species populations in an economically efficient manner. The permittee may identify and assign an outside party for implementing the monitoring program, but the permittee is ultimately responsible for its funding, adequacy, and completion.)

1. Establish specific objectives for monitoring;
2. Clarify the focus of the monitoring program (specific species, specific habitat types, etc.);
3. Specify the characteristics to be monitored and methods to be employed for data collection;
4. Establish a monitoring schedule that determines the frequency and duration by which monitoring will take place; and
5. Discuss the process by which data will be analyzed (who will perform the analysis, how will data be evaluated etc.)

==== Identify/provide funding ====
Every HCP is required to identify the funding that will be provided for its implementation. Sufficient funding must be provided for all proposed activities, including those relating to any necessary surveys, monitoring programs, mitigation programs, and construction of the proposed project. Funding amounts and contributors will vary based on the scale of the proposed project. Projects impacting large areas of land, for example, typically require funding from multiple sources. The HCP must identify all financial contributors and planned allocation of funds.

==== Analyze alternatives ====
Permittees are required to include a discussion of other options, besides the proposed action/project, that would not result in the proposed taking. It is common for this discussion to include two alternatives; one being a "no action" alternative under which a permit would not be issued and the proposed project would not be developed, the other being a specific project alternative that would result in a reduced impact/take than the proposed project. All alternatives considered during the permit application and HCP development process must be included. Following the discussion of possible alternatives, the permittee must explain why each of the alternatives was deemed unsuitable and not chosen as the proposed project. (Note: The number of alternatives required of an HCP may vary based on the scale of the proposed project.)

==== Consider unforeseen circumstances ====
In the development phase of the HCP process, applicants are encouraged to consider elements that have the potential to change over time. Given the unpredictable nature of the future, it would be impossible to prepare for every situation that has the potential to arise. For this reason, an assurance policy is incorporated in the HCP process.

No Surprises Policy

The No Surprises Policy is designed to protect Incidental Take Permit-holders from having to make future revisions to their approved plan due to unforeseen circumstances. This means that once a permittee has prepared a HCP deemed adequate by USFWS/NMFS, has been issued an Incidental Take Permit, and is successfully implementing the approved HCP, USFWS and NMFS will not require revisions be made to the accepted plan (such as additional mitigation) if unexpected circumstances arise.

=== III. Approval/Implementation Process ===
==== Review of HCP required content ====
Habitat conservation plans may vary to some degree in content; however, there are certain elements that are universally required. Inclusion of the following is required of every HCP:

1. Analysis of impacts that have the potential to occur as a result of the proposed taking of a threatened or endangered species;
2. Sufficient funding for implementing these steps;
3. A plan of action for handling any unanticipated circumstances;
4. A discussion of potential alternative actions taken into consideration by the permittee that would not result in the take of a listed species, and basis for not choosing these alternatives

==== Interpret significance of anticipated incidental take ====
Once the degree of incidental take is calculated based on the factors discussed above, it is up to UFSWS and NMFS to determine if the proposed incidental take should be authorized. When evaluating the estimated level of take, the following criteria (outlined in ESA section 10(a)(2)(B)) are employed to determine if the incidental take is acceptable:

1. The proposed "take" of a species would be incidental (it would be the result of, rather than the purpose for, an otherwise legal action).
2. The party applying for the Incidental Take Permit would develop a mitigation program capable of minimizing and mitigating the impacts of the proposed take to the maximum extent practicable.
3. The party applying for the Incidental Take Permit would ensure that sufficient funding for the HCP will be provided.
4. The proposed take would not substantially diminish the ability of the species to recover and survive in the wild.

The HCP must be consistent with these criteria before being approved for an Incidental Take Permit. If the estimated level of take is determined to exceed allowable amounts by USFWS and NMFS, the HCP must be revised to further reduce the potential for take. This is often most easily achieved by increasing the amount of land that will remain undisturbed.

==== Implementing agreement ====
Implementing Agreements are made between the permittee and USFWS/NMFS to assure that the permittee will follow through on their obligation to implement the mitigation program identified by the HCP. They are individually tailored for HCPs and include all applicable permit conditions and requirements of the parties involved. They are signed by all parties, thereby establishing the intent of adhering to the terms identified by the HCP. Implementing Agreements are not required of every HCP; they are most often utilized for large-scale projects involving multiple parties and are rarely used for Low-Effect HCPs.

== Progress and momentum of the Habitat Conservation Plan ==
Since its inclusion in the ESA in 1982, the process of habitat conservation planning has been steadily gaining momentum. Between 1982 and 1992, the USFWS had approved a total of 14 HCPs and had issued 14 incidental take permits. As of December 2005, over 430 HCPs had been officially approved, varying in size and scope, with many more in the development phase.

== Additional conservation agreements ==
Congress addressed taking restrictions in the 1990s by creating additional agreements to assist in species recovery. Instituted by USFWS and NMFS, safe harbor agreements and candidate conservation agreements are incentive-driven and voluntary. Because of their greater flexibility for property owners, these agreements are likely to become more popular.

=== Safe Harbor Agreement (SHA) ===
Similar to HCPs, Safe Harbor Agreements (SHAs) are voluntary agreements between non-federal landowners and USFWS or NMFS. SHAs encourage landowners to create, enhance, or maintain habitat for threatened or endangered species on their property. Prior to the agreement, landowners and agencies establish baseline conditions for the habitat to be capable of supporting the species. The agency provides assurances to the landowners and guarantees that, if the conditions of the SHA are met, the landowners will not be subject to any additional requirements than previously agreed upon. Incidental take by the landowner is authorized as long as the species does not fall below the agreed-upon baseline conditions. Landowners are not bound indefinitely to SHAs and can either renew or let the agreements expire. This allows landowners to freely manage their property, including development, as long as they maintain baseline conditions. As of 2009, USFWS had entered into over 70 SHAs.

=== Candidate Conservation Agreement (CCA) ===
Similar to SHAs, Candidate Conservation Agreements (CCAs) are voluntary agreements between private or public parties (including landowners, state, local, and federal agencies) and USFWS or NMFS. CCAs aim to protect candidate species that are in decline and vulnerable to becoming endangered if measures are not taken to protect their habitat. CCAs encourage landowners to create, enhance, or maintain habitat for these species on their property. CCAs do not provide assurances for landowners or authorize incidental take.

=== Candidate Conservation Agreement with Assurances (CCAA) ===
Candidate Conservation Agreements with Assurances (CCAAs) are voluntary agreements between non-federal landowners and USFWS or NMFS. CCAAs provide assurances and authorize a specific allotment of incidental take by the landowner.

== Flexible scope of Habitat Conservation Plans ==
=== Example: Small-scale HCP ===
HCPs are designed to be flexible to accommodate a range of projects that vary greatly in size and scope, from single-property developments to hundreds of thousands of acres involving multiple parties. A HCP created for construction of a single-family home on a 0.44-acre lot in Scotts Valley, California proposed mitigation and minimization measures aimed at the endangered Mount Hermon June beetle (Polyphylla barbata) and Ben Lomond spineflower (Chorizanthe pungens var. hartwegiana). Measures for the 5,856 ft^{2} project included no development on the land where the spineflower is located and elimination of non-native plants growth on the land to prevent competition. Measures to protect the beetle took into account breeding and flight activities and proposed landscaping to promote the beetle's habitat.

=== Example: Large-scale HCP ===
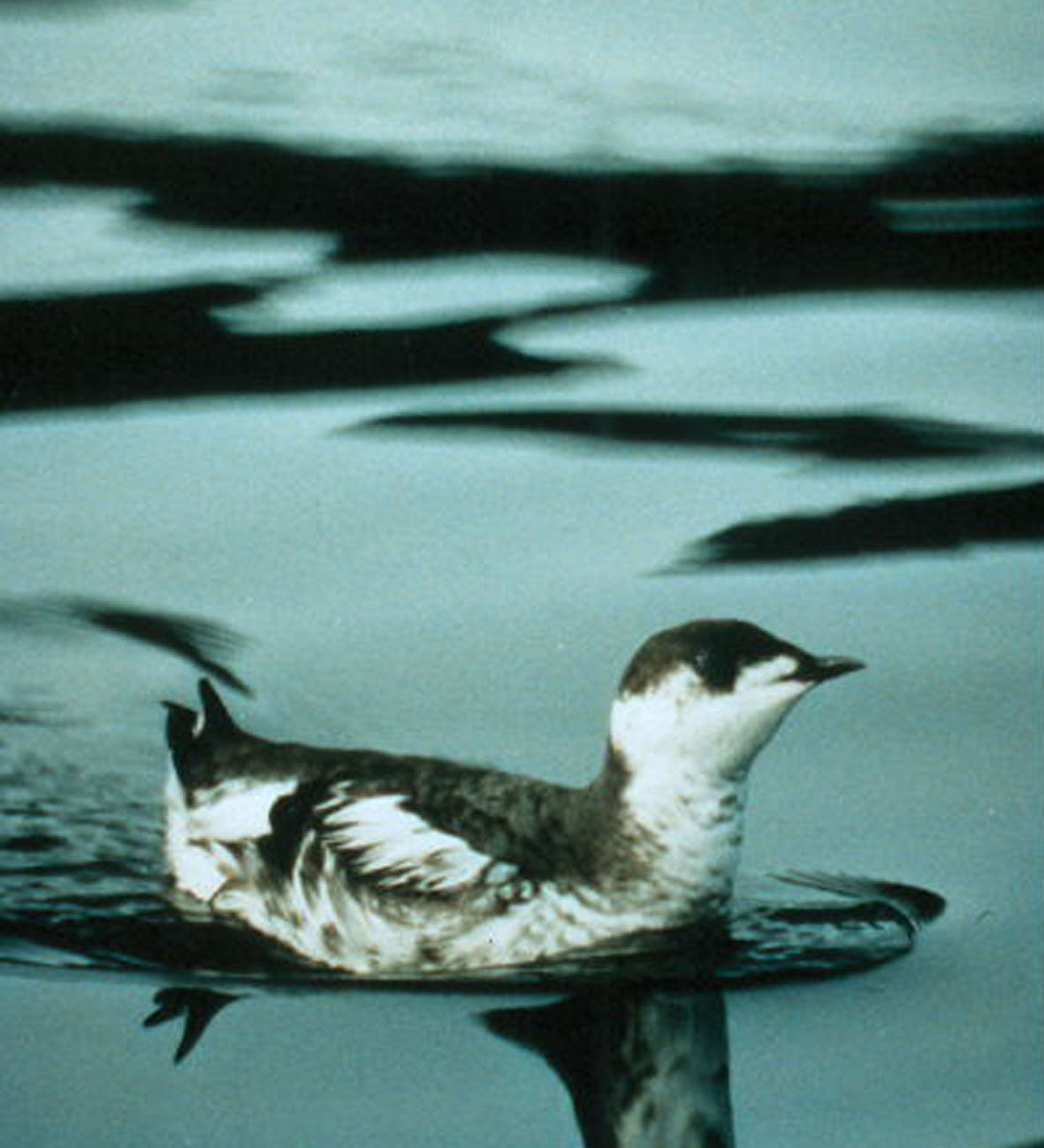
Threatened marbled murrelet (Brachyramphus marmoratus)

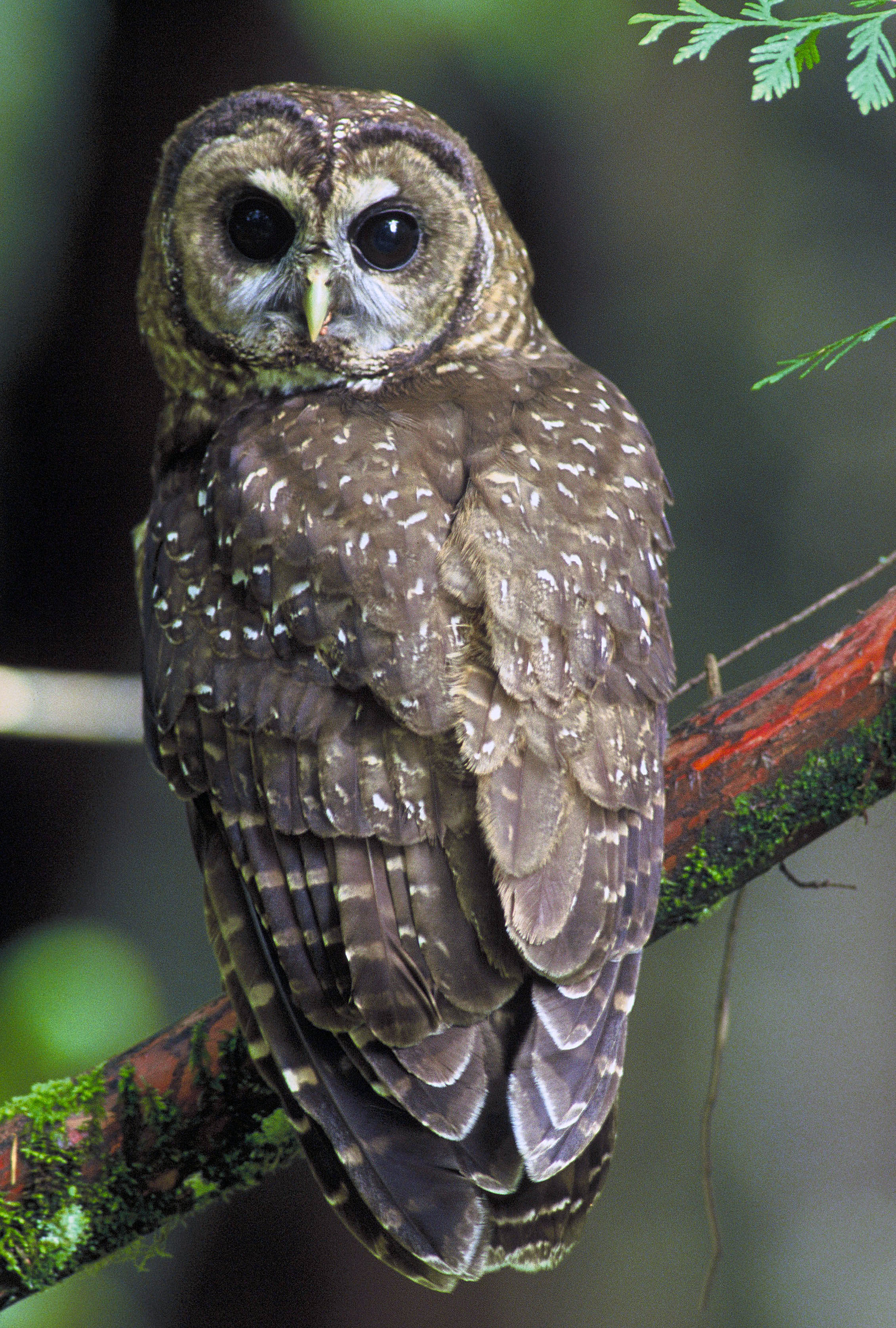
Threatened northern spotted owl (Strix occidentalis caurina). A project, such as planned logging, that might lead to habitat destruction of the northern spotted owl would require submitting a Habitat Conservation Plan as part of its Incidental Take Permit.

Alternatively, the large-scale HCP created for 269,769 acres of the Headwaters Forest in Northern California near Eureka dealt with the largest old-growth redwood ecosystem in the United States. The threatened northern spotted owl (Strix occidentalis caurina) and marbled murrelet (Brachyramphus marmoratus) rely on the large redwoods for nesting as well as the threatened coho salmon (Oncorhynchus kisutch), who are dependent on the habitat's stream for spawning. Pacific Lumber Company, Scotia Pacific Holding Company, and Salmon Creek Company (collectively known as PALCO) created an HCP in 1998 that addressed road building and timber harvest as the greatest threats to the species. The resulting extensive mitigation and monitoring measures provided strict restrictions for land use, including buffers and operational limitations in riparian areas with active murrelet nests. The HCP also maintained that northern spotted owl nesting, roosting, and foraging habitat be provided and maintained.

== Strengths and weaknesses of HCPs ==
The environmental community and landowners take different stands on HCPs.

Strengths:

- Flexible to accommodate a wide range of projects that vary greatly in size and scope.
- Forces consideration of species by all parties.
- Reduced uncertainty for landowners.

Weaknesses:

- Inflexible with regards to changing knowledge relating to species and habitat.
- The "No Surprises Policy" has been highly controversial with critics arguing that it burdens the agencies, rather than landowners, with additional financial and mitigation responsibilities if unforeseen circumstances arise.
- HCPs are viewed as having weak and insufficient monitoring plans. Additionally, the parties responsible for monitoring HCPs are not regulated in a systematic manner due to private funding.
- Criticism over scientific standards and limited credible scientific data.
- Agencies have interpreted the role of HCPs under section 10(a) of the ESA as a means to contribute to survival of species but not as a recovery tool. The Habitat Conservation Planning Handbook is inconsistent with this stand and states that "…contribution to recovery is often an integral product of an HCP…" and in general, conservation plans that are not consistent with recovery plan objectives should be discouraged".

== The role of HCPs in court (previous cases/standing) ==
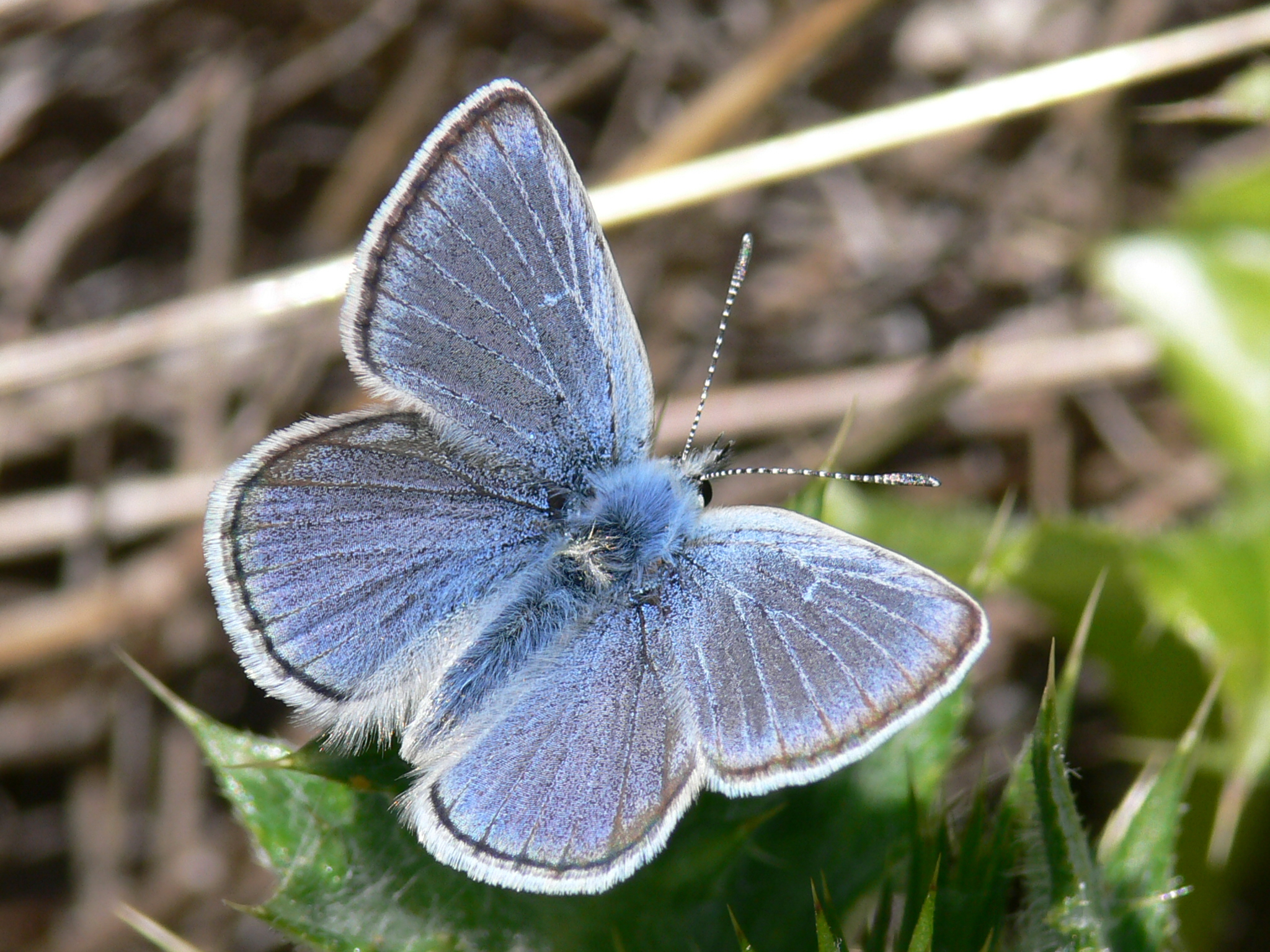
Endangered mission blue butterfly (Icaricia icarioides missionensis), protected by the San Bruno Mountain HCP.

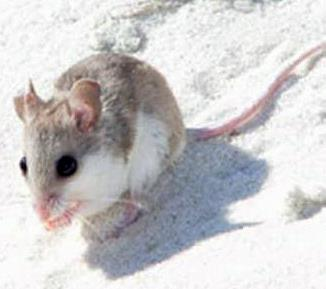
Endangered Alabama beach mouse (Peromyscus polionotus ammobates) at issue in Sierra Club v. Babbitt, in which it was threatened by beachfront condominium development.

The number of approved HCPs has grown since the first HCP was created in 1983 for San Bruno Mountain in San Mateo County, California. Congress wanted the San Bruno Mountain HCP to serve as a model for future HCPs in that it was created from "an independent exhaustive biological study" and that it considered the habitat of the mission blue butterfly (Aricia icarioides missionensis) "to allow for enhancement of the survival of the species".

This model has drawn concern because it focuses more on species survival, while the intent of HCPs is to aid species recovery; and has resulted in HCPs being frequently challenged in court. In Sierra Club v. Babbitt, 15 F. Supp. 2D 1274 (S.D.Ala.1998), the Plaintiff challenged the USFWS issuance of Incidental Take Permits to the developers of two beachfront condominium projects based on the HCPs submitted as part of the application process. The Plaintiffs argued that the HCPs created for the endangered Alabama beach mouse (Peromyscus polionotus ammobates) did not fulfill the requirements of ESA section 10(a)(2)(B) requiring the development of "a mitigation program that will minimize and mitigate the impacts of the proposed taking to the maximum extent practicable". Additionally, the Plaintiff argued that there was insufficient biological data for the Alabama beach mouse species in the HCP, including population abundance, to determine allowable levels of take. The Court found for the Plaintiffs and remanded the decision to issue the Incidental Take Permits to USFWS.

== See also ==
- 1973 in the environment
- 1982 in the environment
- United States energy law
