= Little Lagoon =

Lagoon in Gulf Shores, Alabama, USA

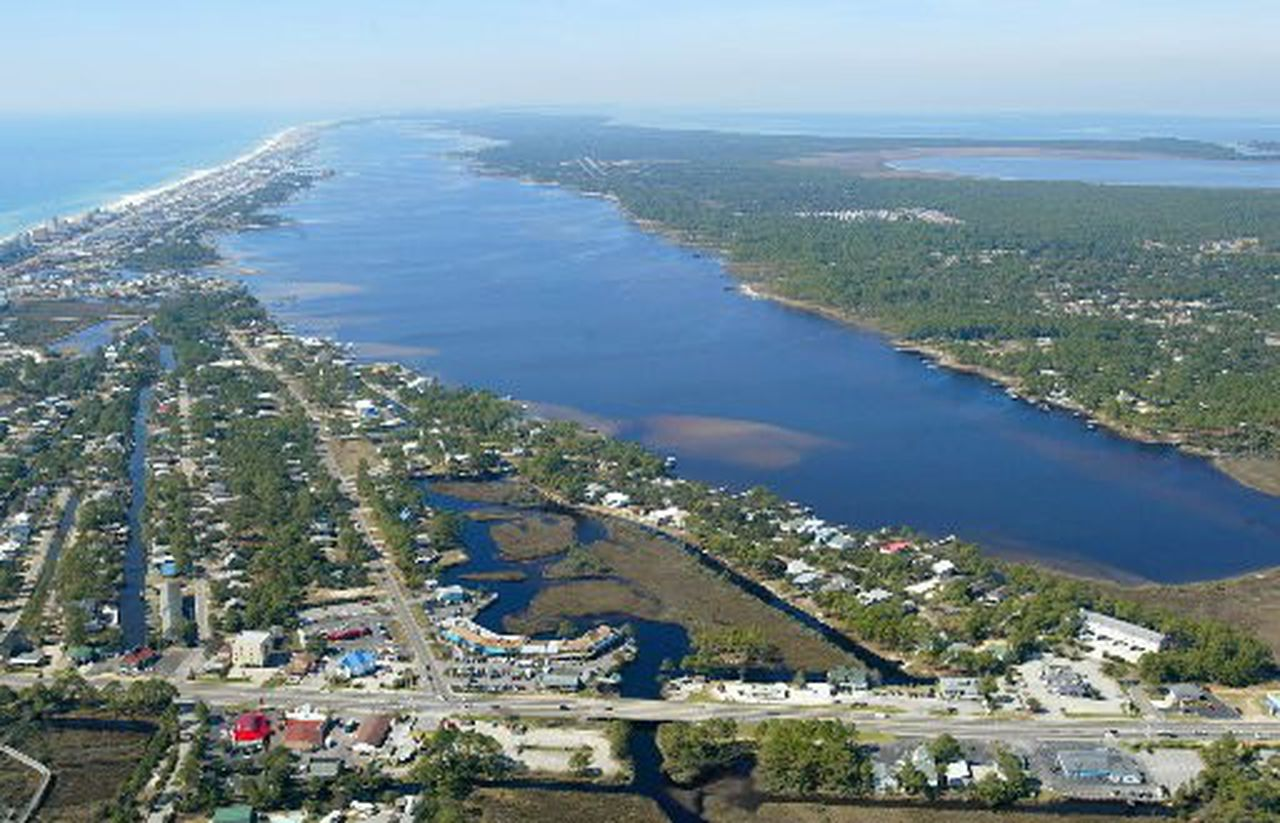
Little Lagoon aerial photography.

Little Lagoon is a shallow, brackish lagoon located in Gulf Shores, Alabama. The lagoon is approximately 10 miles long and 0.5 miles wide, with an average depth of 4-6 feet, and has a surface area of approximately 2,480 surface acres. The western shore portion of the lagoon is part of the Bon Secour National Wildlife Refuge while the remainder is private property.

== Geography ==
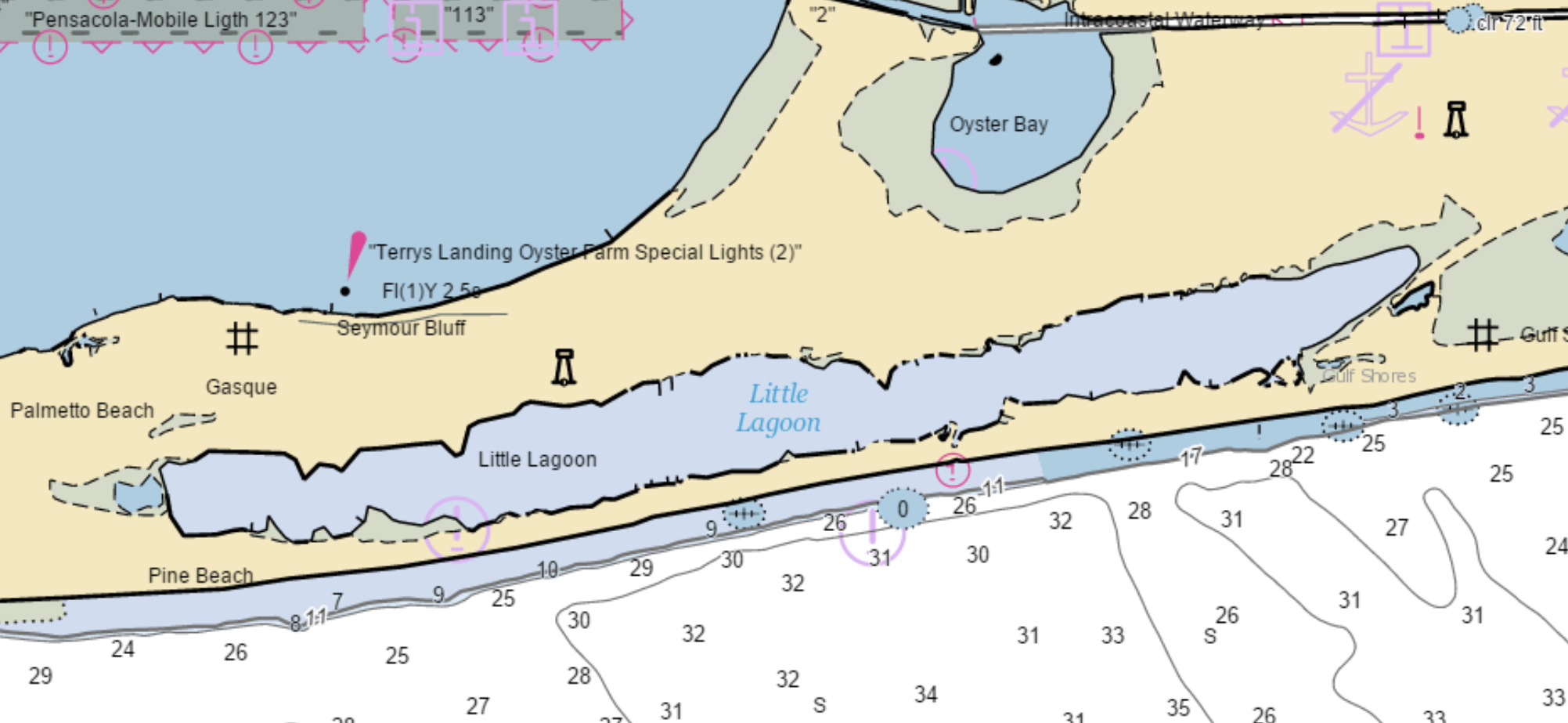
Little Lagoon Nautical Chart

Little Lagoon is located on the western side of Gulf Shores, Alabama, and is situated between the Gulf of Mexico and Bon Secour Bay. The lagoon has four small fresh/brackish water lakes that drain into it, Lake Shelby (678 acres), Middle Lake (250 acres), Little Lake (45 acres), and Gator Lake (45 acres). While the Little Lagoon Pass connects the lagoon to the Gulf of Mexico. The pass is located at the southern end of the lagoon and is a popular spot for fishing.

== Little Lagoon Pass ==
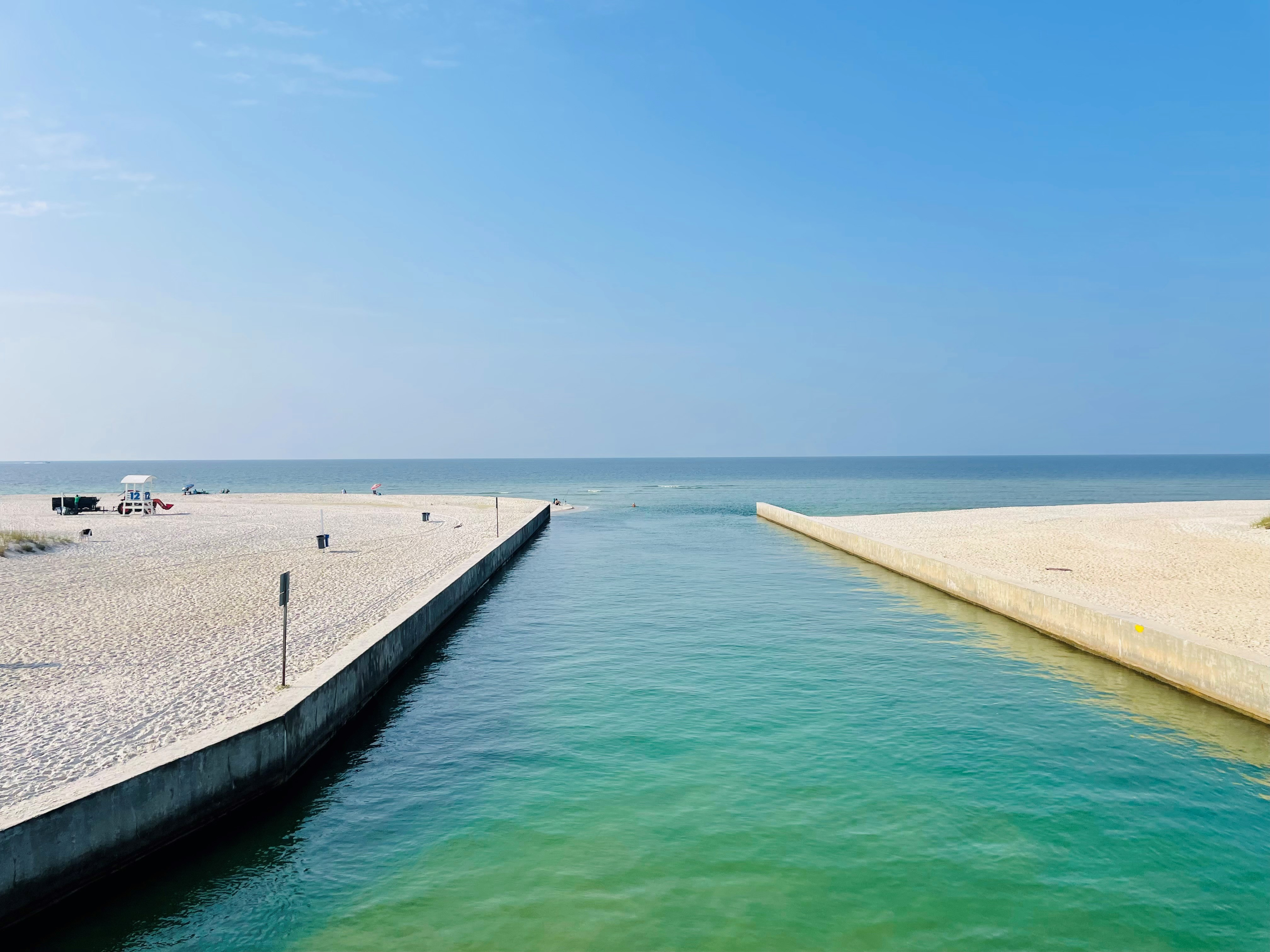
View of the Little Lagoon Pass from the bridge, facing the Gulf of Mexico.

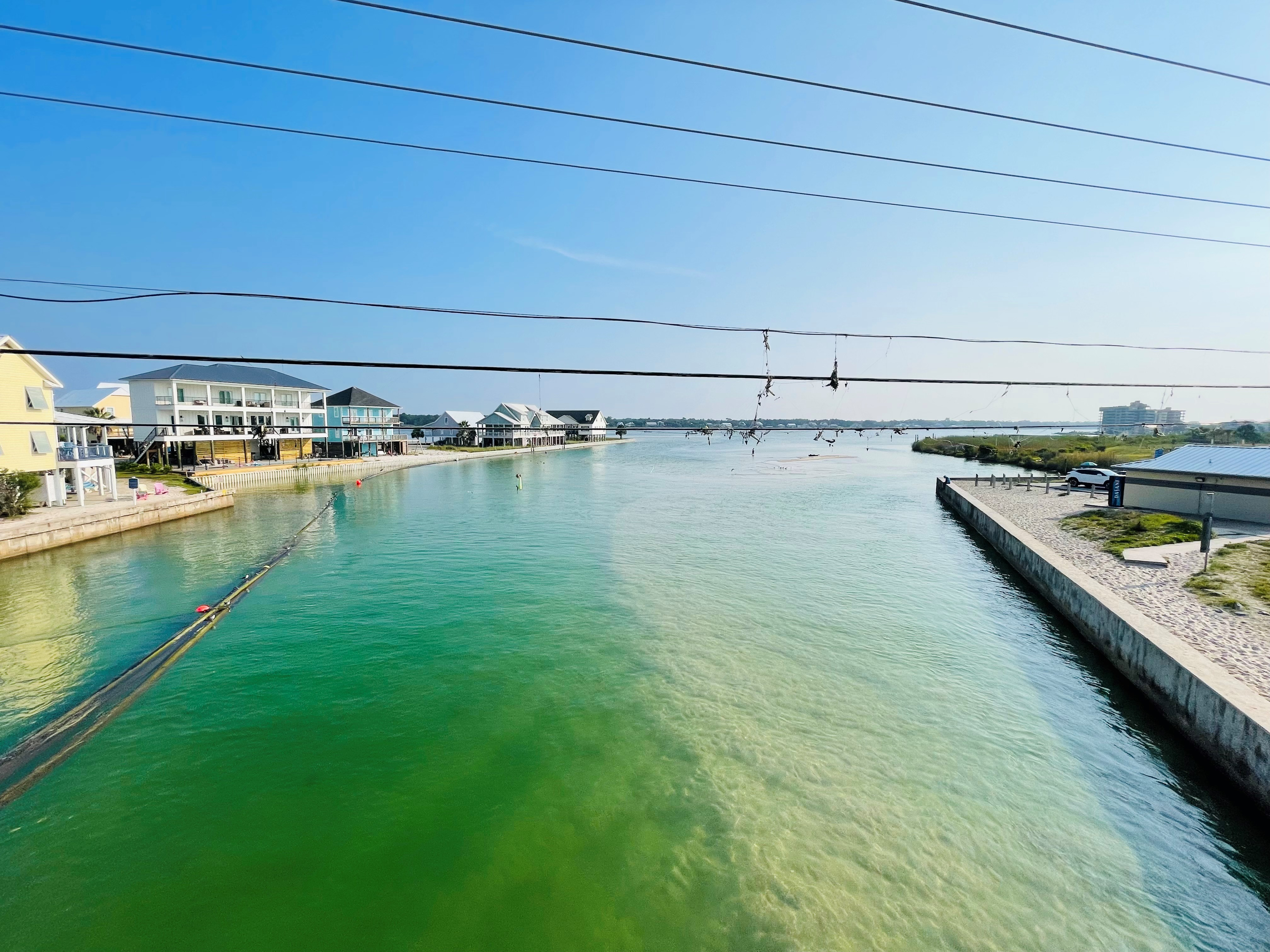
View of Little Lagoon Pass from the bridge towards Little Lagoon.

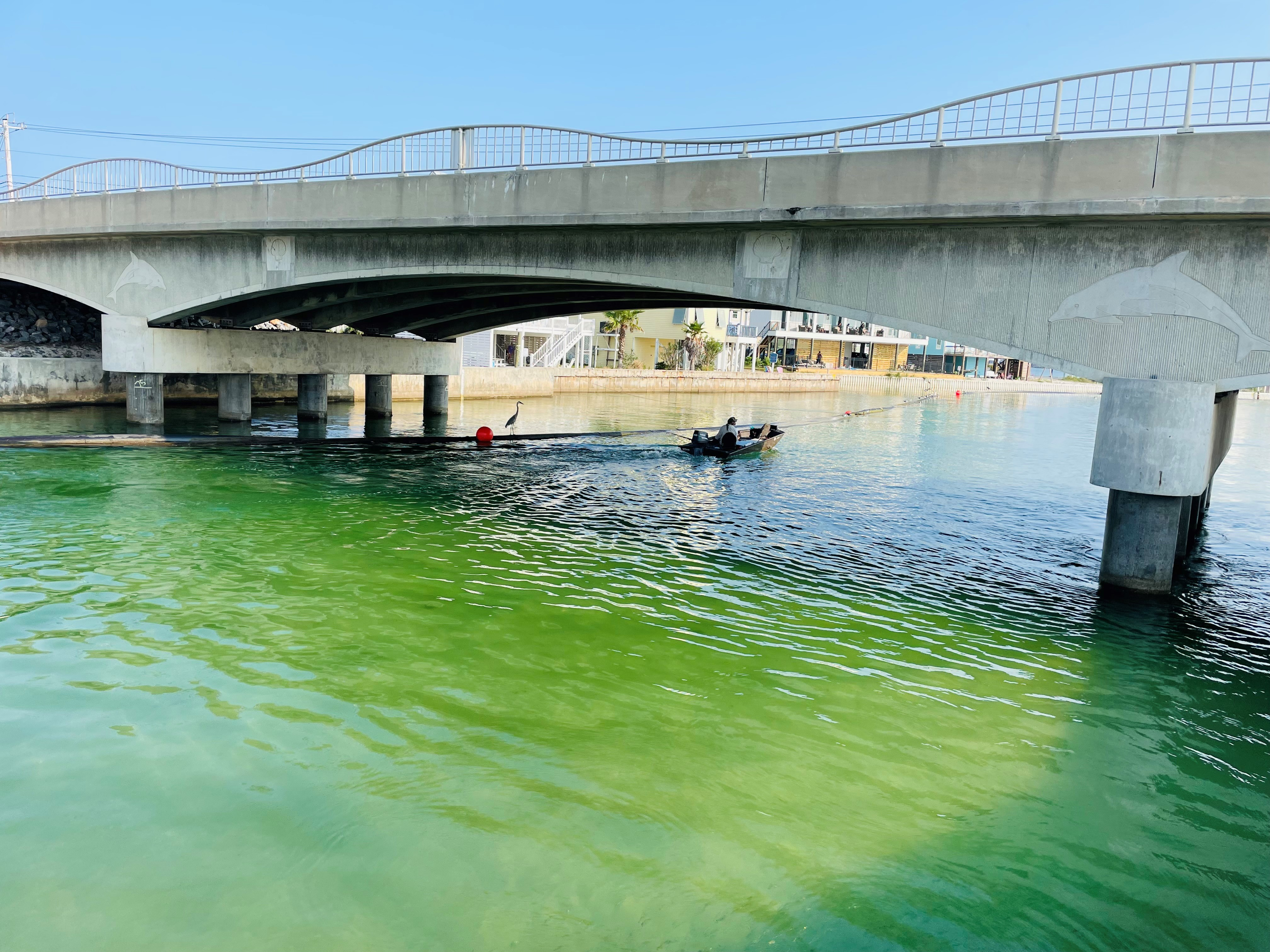
Bridge height of the Little Lagoon Pass

=== History ===
In 1847, the shoreline west of Perdido Pass was reported continuous to Fort Morgan, AL; however, by 1918, one small inlet had formed south of Lake Shelby and a slightly larger inlet formed south of the eastern end of Little Lagoon, which is known today as Little Lagoon Pass. Both features likely formed during the hurricane of 1916.

=== Little Lagoon Pass Dredging ===
In 1991 a lawsuit was filed against the Alabama Department of Transportation which resulted in a court order requiring the Alabama Department of Transportation to dredge and maintain the channel into the lagoon and to place pass channel dredge spoils back into the coastal drift system west of the pass. Little Lagoon pass dredging is a major and continuous project undertaken in Gulf Shores, Alabama, aimed at restoring the natural flow of water between Little Lagoon and the Gulf of Mexico. It involves the removal of sand from the Little Lagoon Pass, which had become an obstacle to water flow and was causing stagnation in the lagoon. The state of Alabama spends approximately $400,000 a year to hire an engineering company to maintain the pass.

== Flora and fauna ==
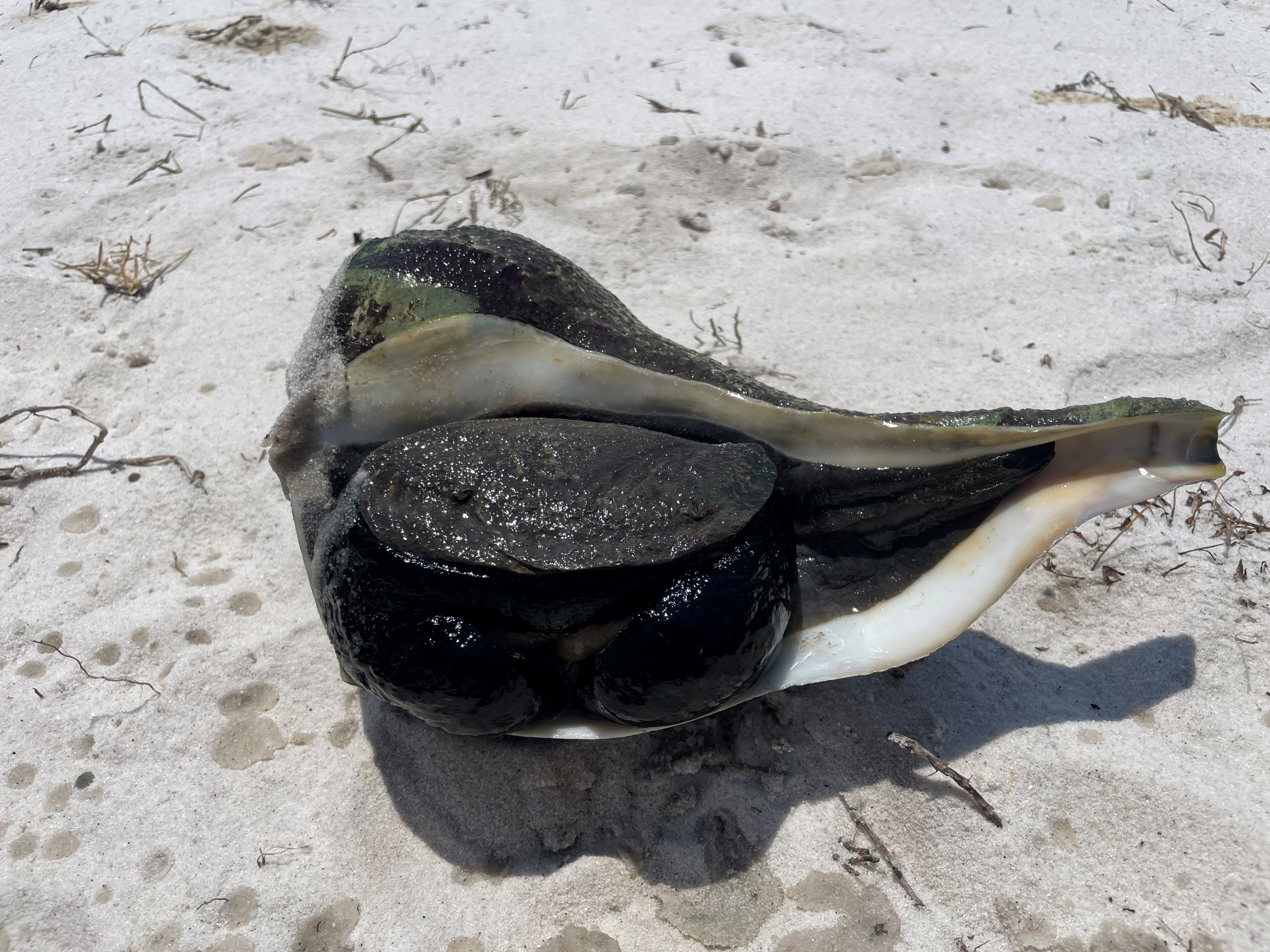
Lightning whelk

Little Lagoon is home to a variety of flora and fauna, including several species of fish (red drum, spotted seatrout, mangrove snapper), lightning whelk, crustaceans, and mollusks. The lagoon is also home to a variety of bird species, including herons, egrets, and pelicans. The surrounding areas of Little Lagoon are home to a variety of plant species, including sea oats, palmetto bushes, slash pine, longleaf pine, and live oak trees.

== Recreation ==
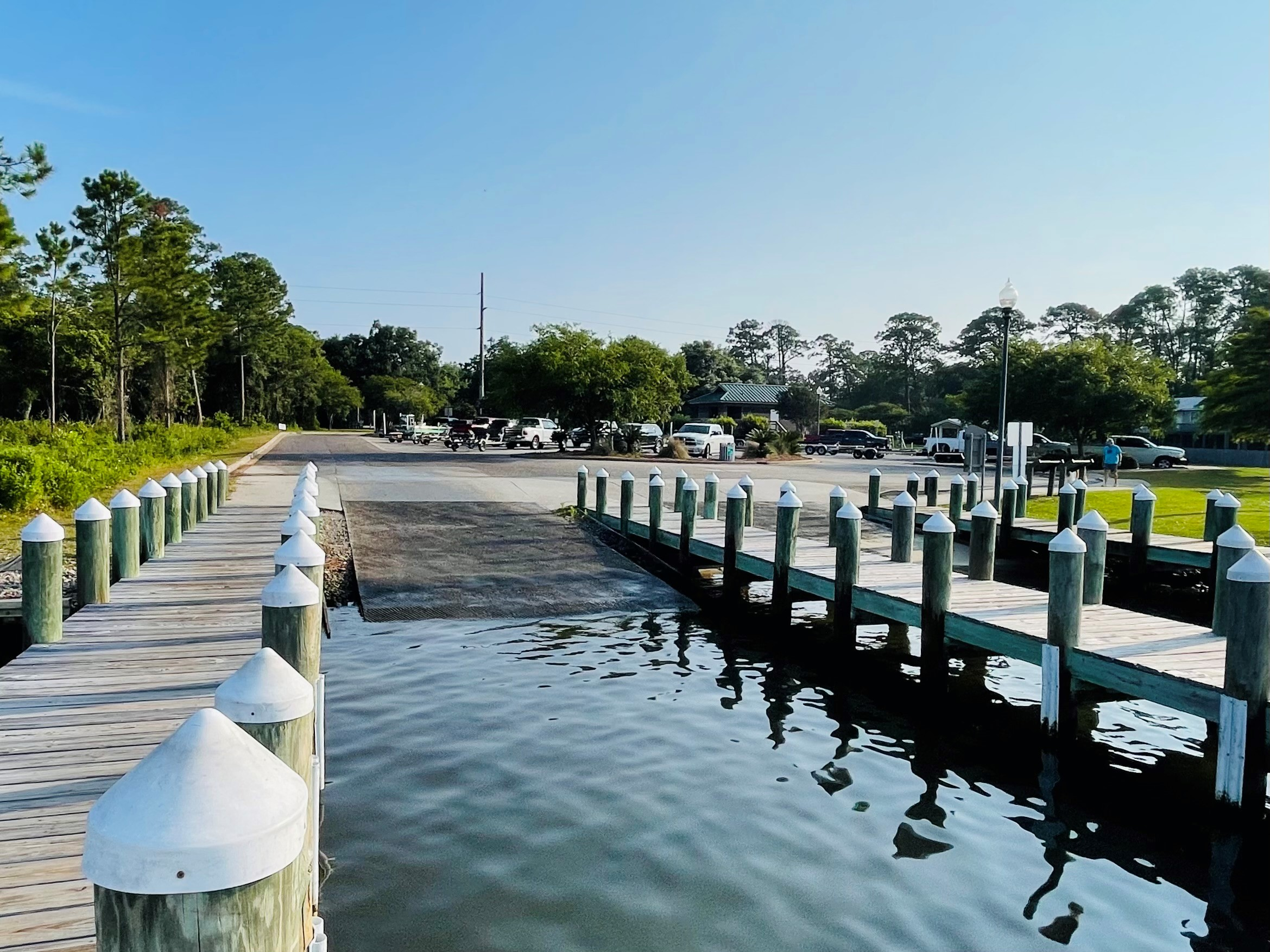
Mo's Landing on the Little Lagoon

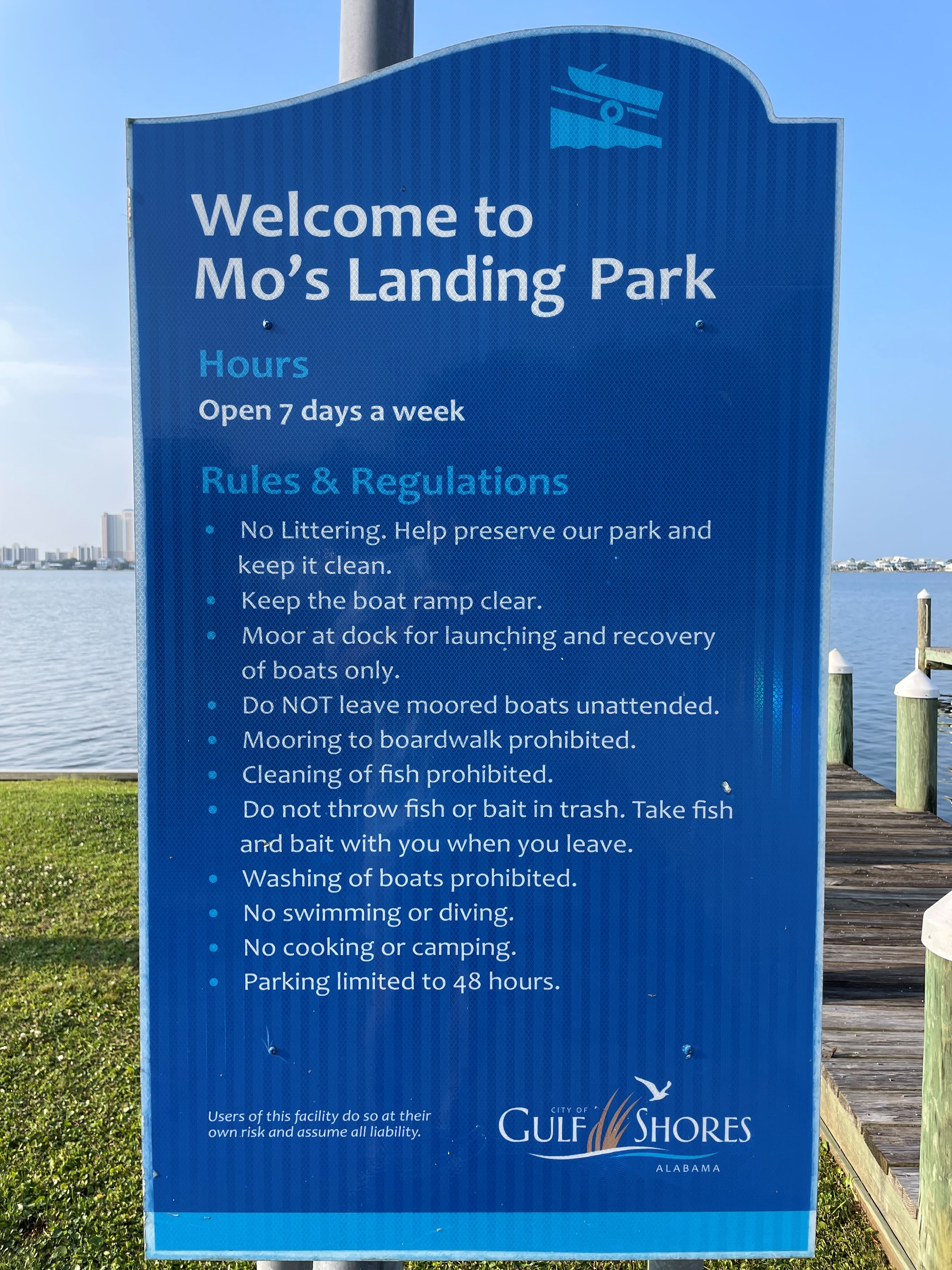
Mo's Landing Sign Info

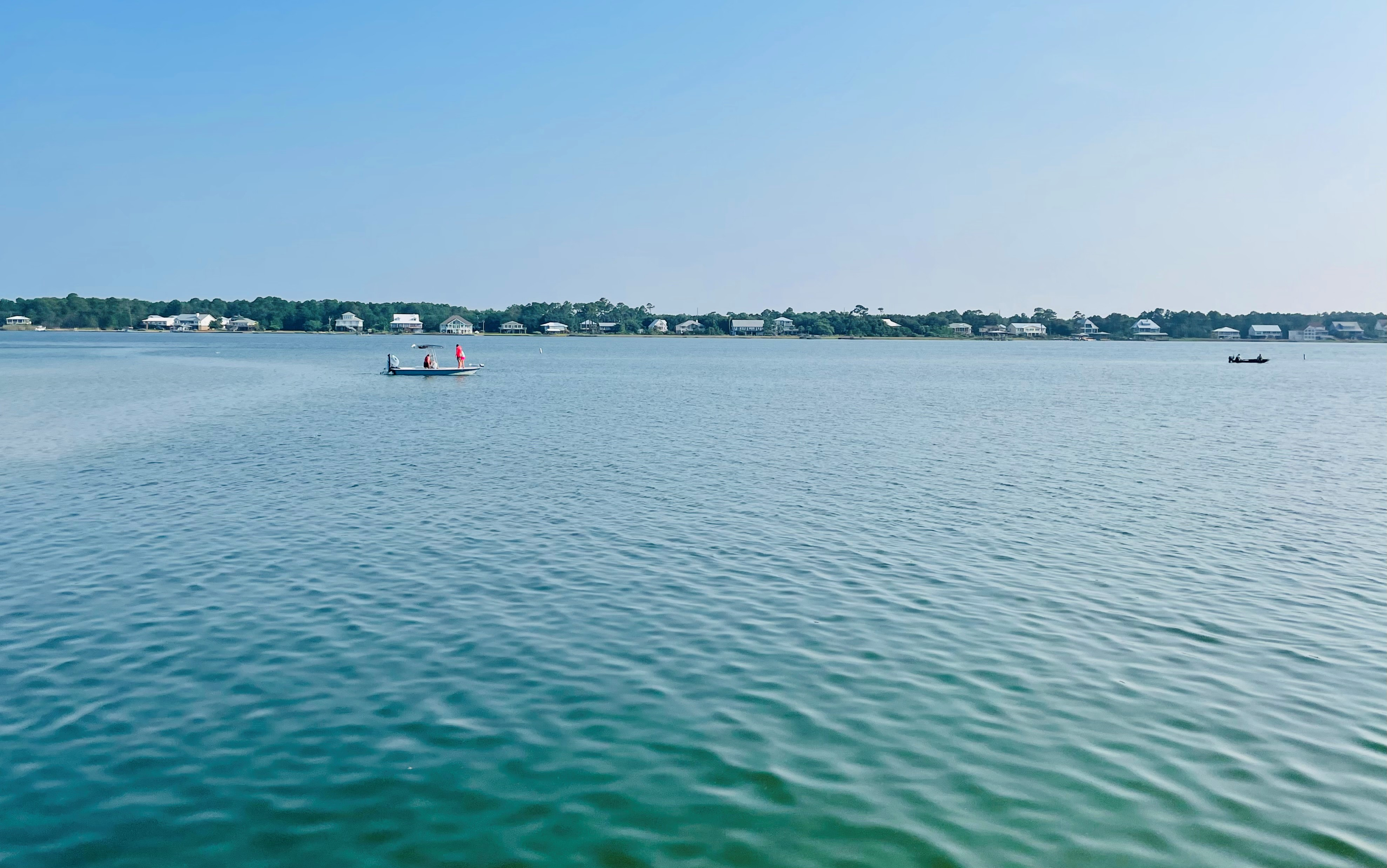
Recreational Fishing at the pass opening on Little Lagoon.

Little Lagoon is a popular spot for recreational activities, including boating, fishing, crabbing, and kayaking. The western part of the lagoon is also a popular spot for birdwatching and nature photography. There are four public access points to Little Lagoon, including a public boat launch, hiking trails, and a public beach. One of the boat landings on Little Lagoon is Mo's Landing Park, a free public boat launch accessible 7 days a week.

== Conservation ==
Little Lagoon is an important ecosystem that provides habitat for a variety of plant and animal species. The lagoon has faced environmental threats over the years, including pollution and habitat loss. In response, a few organizations, including the Friends of the Lagoon, The Little Lagoon Preservation Society, LLPS, and the Coastal Alabama Clean Water Partnership, have worked to protect and preserve Little Lagoon and its surrounding wetlands.
