= Agreement on the Conservation of Polar Bears =

International polar bear protection treaty

The Agreement on the Conservation of Polar Bears is a multilateral treaty signed in Oslo, November 15, 1973, by the five nations with the largest polar bear populations: Canada, Denmark (Greenland), Norway (Svalbard), the United States, and the Soviet Union. This treaty was brought about due to increased hunting of polar bears during the 1960s and 1970s which led to polar bears being under severe survival pressure from hunters.

The agreement prohibits random, unregulated sport hunting of polar bears and outlaws hunting of polar bears from aircraft and icebreakers which have been the most detrimental to the polar bear population. Additionally, the agreement holds member states accountable for taking appropriate actions to protect the ecosystems of which the polar bears dwell, paying special attention to places where polar bears create dens, do a majority of their feeding, and where they migrate. States also must manage polar bear populations in accordance with proper conservation practices based on the best available scientific data.

According to the agreement the killing of polar bears is only warranted for bona fide scientific purposes, to prevent serious disturbances of other living resources such as human populations, and by local people using traditional methods in the realm of their traditional rights in accordance with the laws of that party. Yet the skins or any other items of value that are taken as a result of the killing of a polar bear cannot be used for commercial purposes. Also important to this agreement is that member states must prohibit the exportation, importation, and trafficking of polar bears within their states. These nations share their polar bear research findings and meet every three to four years to coordinate their research on polar bears throughout the Arctic. This agreement was one of the first of its kind and continues to be successful today in the international conservation of polar bears.

== See also ==
- Bear conservation
