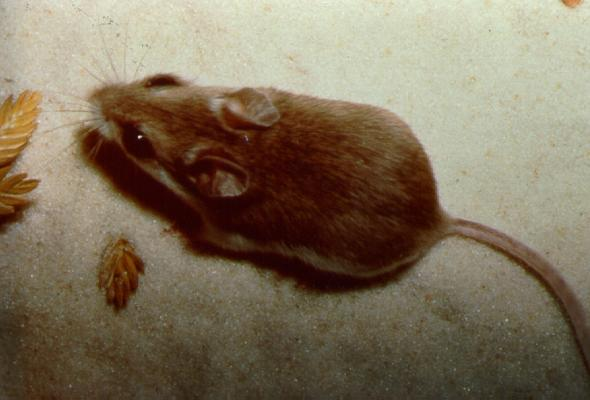

Conservation status
- Critically Imperiled (NatureServe)

- Endangered (ESA)

Scientific classification
- Kingdom: Animalia
- Phylum: Chordata
- Class: Mammalia
- Infraclass: Placentalia
- Order: Rodentia
- Family: Cricetidae
- Subfamily: Neotominae
- Genus: Peromyscus
- Species: P. polionotus
- Subspecies: P. p. ammobates

Trinomial name
- Peromyscus polionotus ammobates Bowen, 1968

= Alabama beach mouse =

Subspecies of oldfield mouse

The Alabama beach mouse (Peromyscus polionotus ammobates) is a federally endangered subspecies of oldfield mouse that lives along the Alabama coast.

== Description ==
The Alabama beach mouse is around 122 to 153 mm (4.8 to 6 in) long and can weigh anywhere from 10 to 17 g (0.35 to 0.60 oz.). The tail usually accounts for 55 to 65 percent of the total body length. Males are generally smaller than females.

Its coloring ranges from brown to pale gray, with white undersides and feet. A dark brown mid-dorsal stripe is common.

== Distribution and status ==
The range of the Alabama beach mouse historically included much of the Fort Morgan Peninsula on the Alabama Gulf coast, and extended from Ono Island to Fort Morgan. As of 2019, populations have been observed near Fort Morgan, in the Bon Secour National Wildlife Refuge, and a reintroduced population is surviving in Gulf State Park, although it is no longer believed to inhabit areas east of the park.

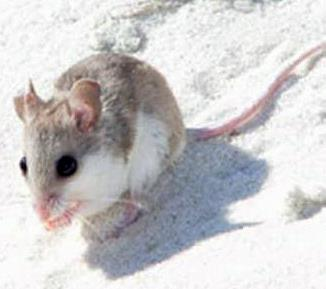
An Alabama beach mouse

The Alabama beach mouse is one of several subspecies of oldfield mice living only in coastal sand dune areas. They are nocturnal and live in burrowed nests in sand dunes, where they have some protection against flooding. They eat various plant seeds and insects. They prefer sand-covered slopes with patches of sea oats, beach grass, and other grasses and herbs.

Beach mice are an important part of the coastal dune ecosystem. Thriving beach mouse populations indicate a healthy dune system. The mice themselves contribute by collecting and distributing seeds. Uneaten seeds grow into plants which help to stabilize dunes. Beach mice are also an important part of the food chain, providing a food source for dune predators such as snakes and owls.

Coastal residential and commercial development and roadway construction have fragmented and destroyed habitat used by this species. Hurricanes, dune use by pedestrians, and tropical storms have also damaged or destroyed sand dunes and related habitats. Stalking by domestic and wild cats and dogs, birds, and raccoons, as well as other animals, plus competition from other rodents have also contributed to Alabama beach mouse declines.

In 1986, the Alabama beach mouse was listed as endangered by the U.S. Fish and Wildlife Service. The species is protected in areas such as the Bon Secour National Wildlife Refuge in Baldwin County, Alabama. In Sierra Club v. Babbitt, environmental organizations halted construction of housing in the Alabama beach mouse's habitat.
