= Incidental take permit =

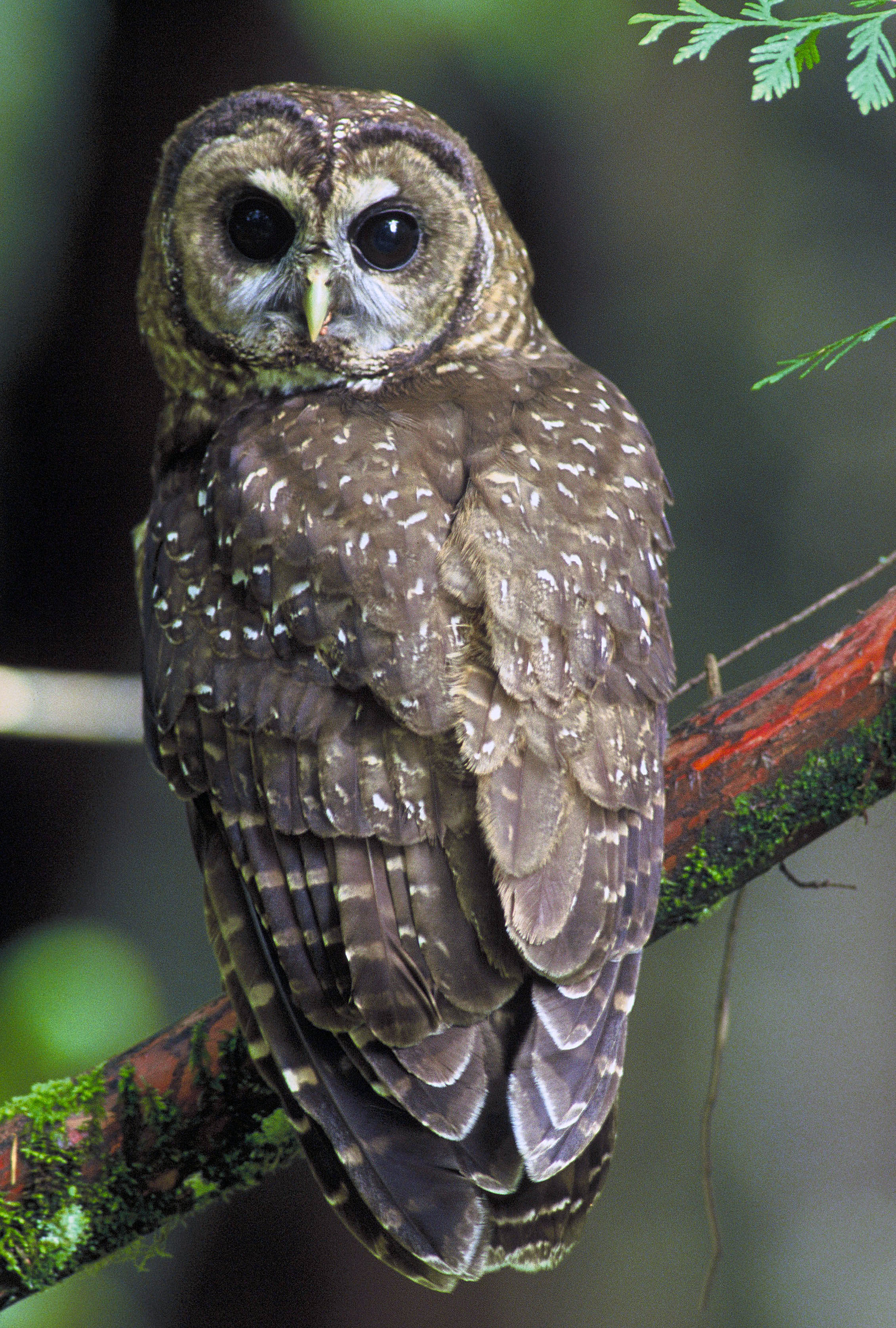
Threatened northern spotted owl (Strix occidentalis caurina). A project, such as planned logging, that might lead to habitat destruction of the northern spotted owl would require submitting an incidental take permit.

An incidental take permit is a permit issued under Section 10 of the United States Endangered Species Act (ESA) to private, non-federal entities undertaking otherwise lawful projects that might result in the take of an endangered or threatened species. Applications for an incidental take permit are subject to certain requirements, including the preparation by the permit applicant of a conservation plan.

"Take" is defined by the ESA as harass, harm, pursue, hunt, shoot, wound, kill, trap, capture, or collect any threatened or endangered species. Harm may include significant habitat modification where it actually kills or injures a listed species through impairment of essential behavior (e.g., nesting or reproduction). In 2025, a draft rule was proposed which would rescind the previous definition of harm and exclude habitat modification from the definition of take under the ESA. In the 1982 ESA amendments, Congress authorized the United States Fish and Wildlife Service (through the Secretary of the Interior) to issue permits for the "incidental take" of endangered and threatened wildlife species (Section 10a(1)B of the ESA). Thus, permit holders can proceed with an activity, such as construction or other economic development, that may result in the "incidental" taking of a listed species.

The 1982 amendment requires that permit applicants design, implement, and secure funding for a Habitat Conservation Plan or "HCP" that minimizes and mitigates harm to the impacted species during the proposed project. The HCP is a legally binding agreement between the Secretary of the Interior and the permit holder.

Note: This article contains public domain text from US government federal agencies.
